= Samsung Galaxy Spica =

Smartphone manufactured by Samsung

Samsung Galaxy Spica (GT-I5700)
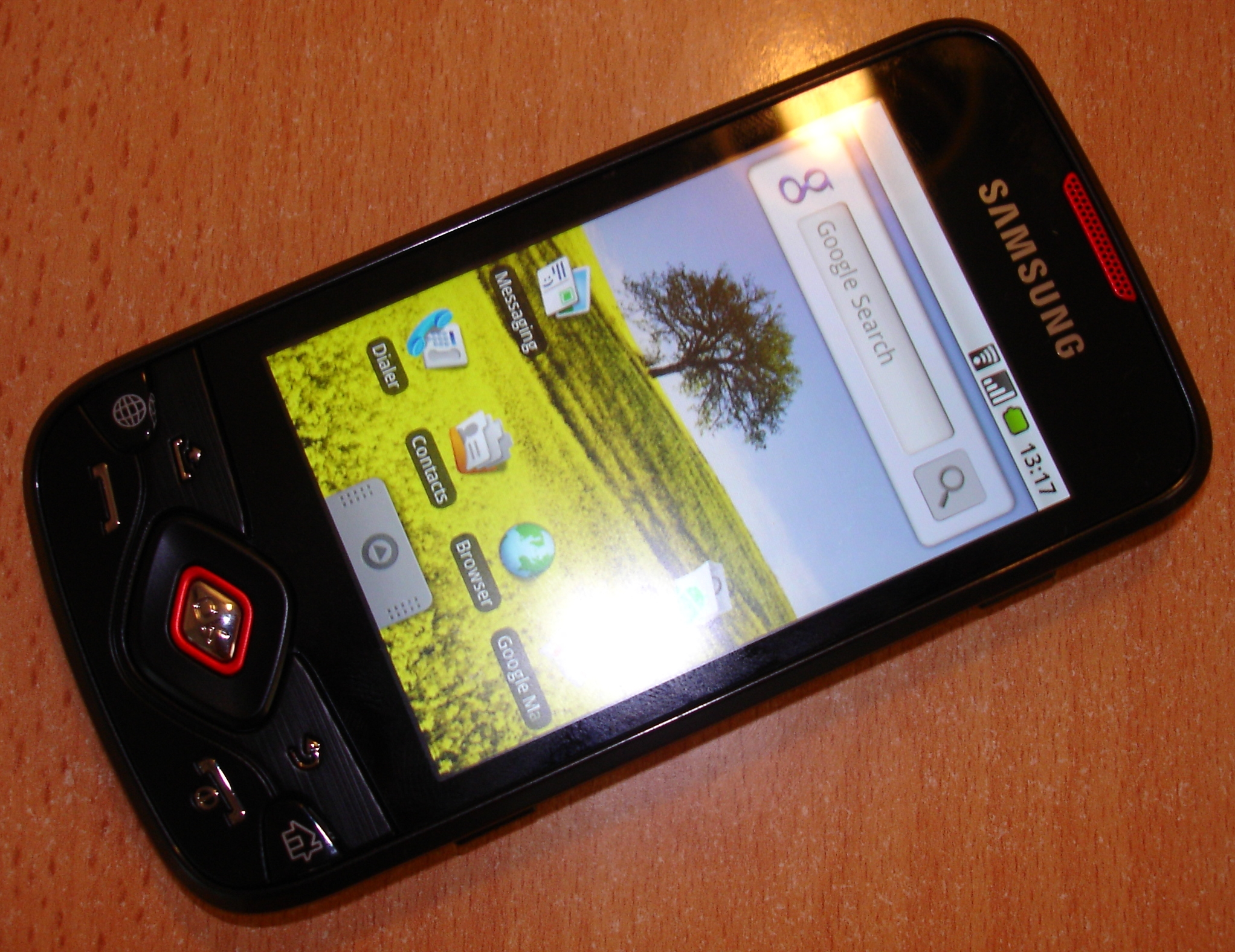
- Manufacturer: Samsung
- First released: November 2009; 16 years ago
- Availability by region: November 2009
- Successor: Samsung Galaxy 3
- Related: Samsung Galaxy (original)
- Compatible networks: HSDPA (3G) 900/2100, Quad band GSM / GPRS / EDGE GSM 850, GSM 900, GSM 1800, GSM 1900
- Form factor: Slate
- Dimensions: 115 mm (4.5 in) H 57 mm (2.2 in) W 13.2 mm (0.52 in) D
- Weight: 124 g (4 oz)
- Operating system: Original: Android 1.5 "Cupcake"; Current: Android 2.1 "Eclair"
- CPU: Samsung S3C6410 800 MHz
- GPU: FIMG 3DSE
- Memory: 256 MB RAM
- Storage: 512 MB flash, 180 MB user available
- Removable storage: MicroSD support for up to 32 GB
- Battery: Li-Ion (1500 mAh)
- Rear camera: 3.2 Megapixels
- Display: 320×480 px, 3.2 in (81 mm), HVGA, 65,536 color LCD at 180 pixels per inch (ppi)
- Connectivity: USB 2.0, Bluetooth 2.1, Wi-Fi 802.11 b/g, GPS
- Data inputs: Touch Screen (capacitive)

The Samsung Galaxy Spica, also known as Samsung Spica, Samsung GT-I5700, Samsung Galaxy Lite and Samsung Galaxy Portal, is a smartphone manufactured by Samsung and introduced in 2009 that uses the open source Android operating system. The phone is positioned below the original Samsung Galaxy, as a budget model. Even though some of its features like the camera resolution, storage and data connection speeds are lower than the i7500, its processor's clock speed is much higher at 800 MHz. It is succeeded by the Samsung Galaxy 3.

== Features ==
The Galaxy Spica is a 3G smartphone, offering quad-band GSM and announced with two-band HSDPA (900/2100) at 3.6 Mbit/s. The phone features a 3.2-inch LCD capacitive touch screen, a 3.2 megapixel autofocus camera, and a digital compass. The i5700 has a standard 3.5mm headphone jack and is equipped with DNSe 2.0.

Software-wise, the Galaxy Spica offers a suite of Mobile Google services, including Google Search, Gmail, YouTube, Google Calendar, and Google Talk. The phone's GPS enables Google Maps features such as My Location, Google Latitude, and Street View. It also supports MP3, AAC (including iTunes Plus downloads), WMA audio, and H.264 video. The phone is also capable of playing DivX and Xvid coded content which makes it the first Android phone that supports this feature.

== Availability ==
The phone was available in Europe, Asia and Middle East. The i5700 is Samsung's second Android-based handset for Europe. The phone was released in December 2009 in Turkey and is released in Canada on the Rogers Communications network.

== Software ==
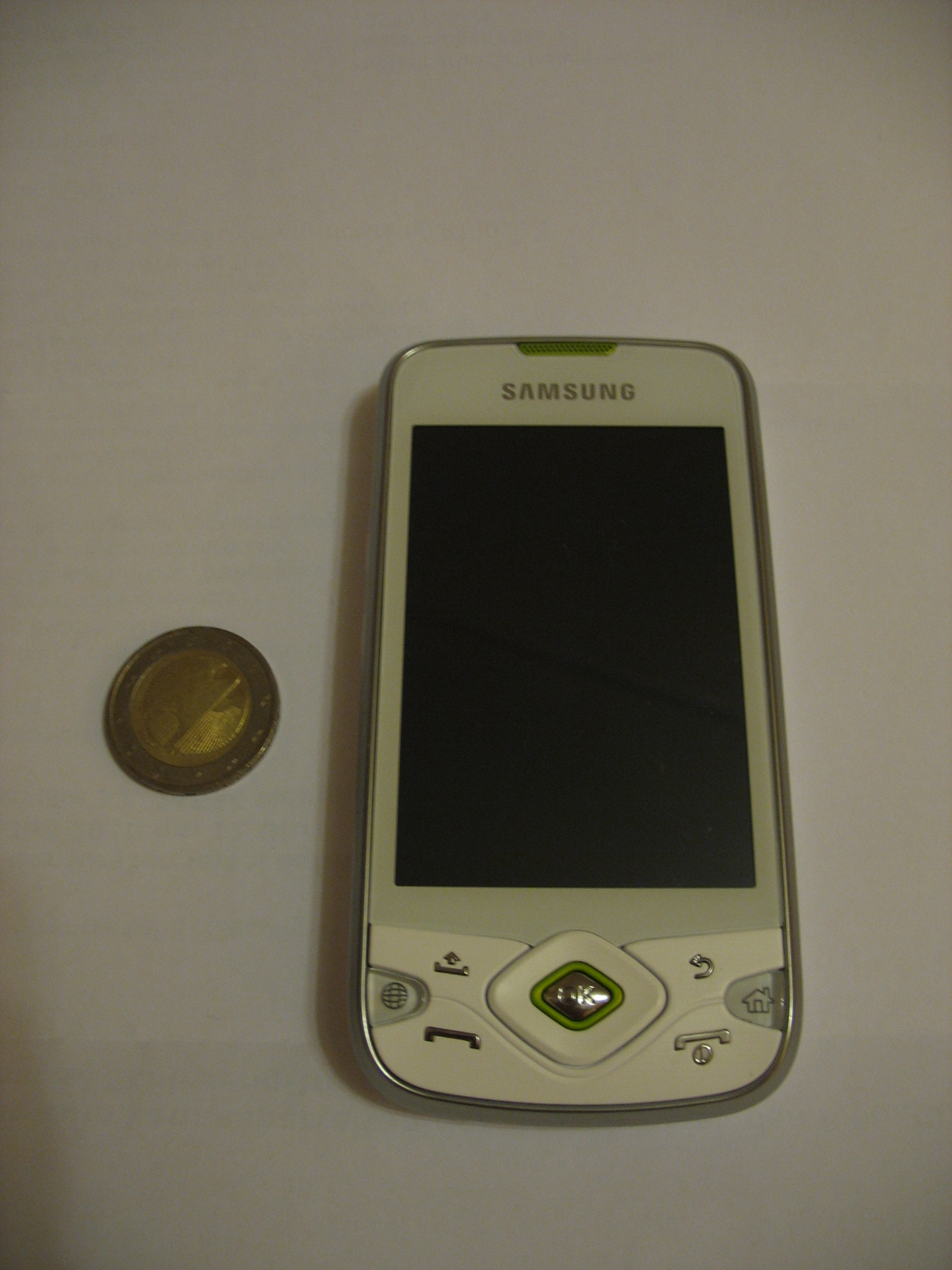
In white

The Samsung Galaxy Spica has received an update to Android 2.1 Eclair as of February 2010. Some phone vendors, such as Three and T-Mobile in the UK, have started shipping the phone with 2.1 Eclair preloaded. As of May 2010, phones have started to sell in India and Indonesia with the 2.1 Eclair update preloaded.

The only official method for updating the Spica is via Samsung's PC Studio software and not, unlike others, via OTA.

It is not possible to update Branded phones in this way. In this case, the phones needs to be updated by an official Samsung Partner.

However, unsupported methods are available using a combination of third-party software and a range of available firmware from Android 1.5 Cupcake to alpha versions of Android 2.2 Froyo, Android 2.3 Gingerbread and Android 4.0 Ice Cream Sandwich.

== See also ==
- List of Android devices
