= Android 2.x =

2009–10 Android mobile operating systems

Android 2.x may refer to:

- Android Eclair (2.0 – 2.1)
- Android Froyo (2.2 – 2.2.3)
- Android Gingerbread (2.3 – 2.3.7)
