= HTC Desire Z =

Smartphone manufactured by HTC

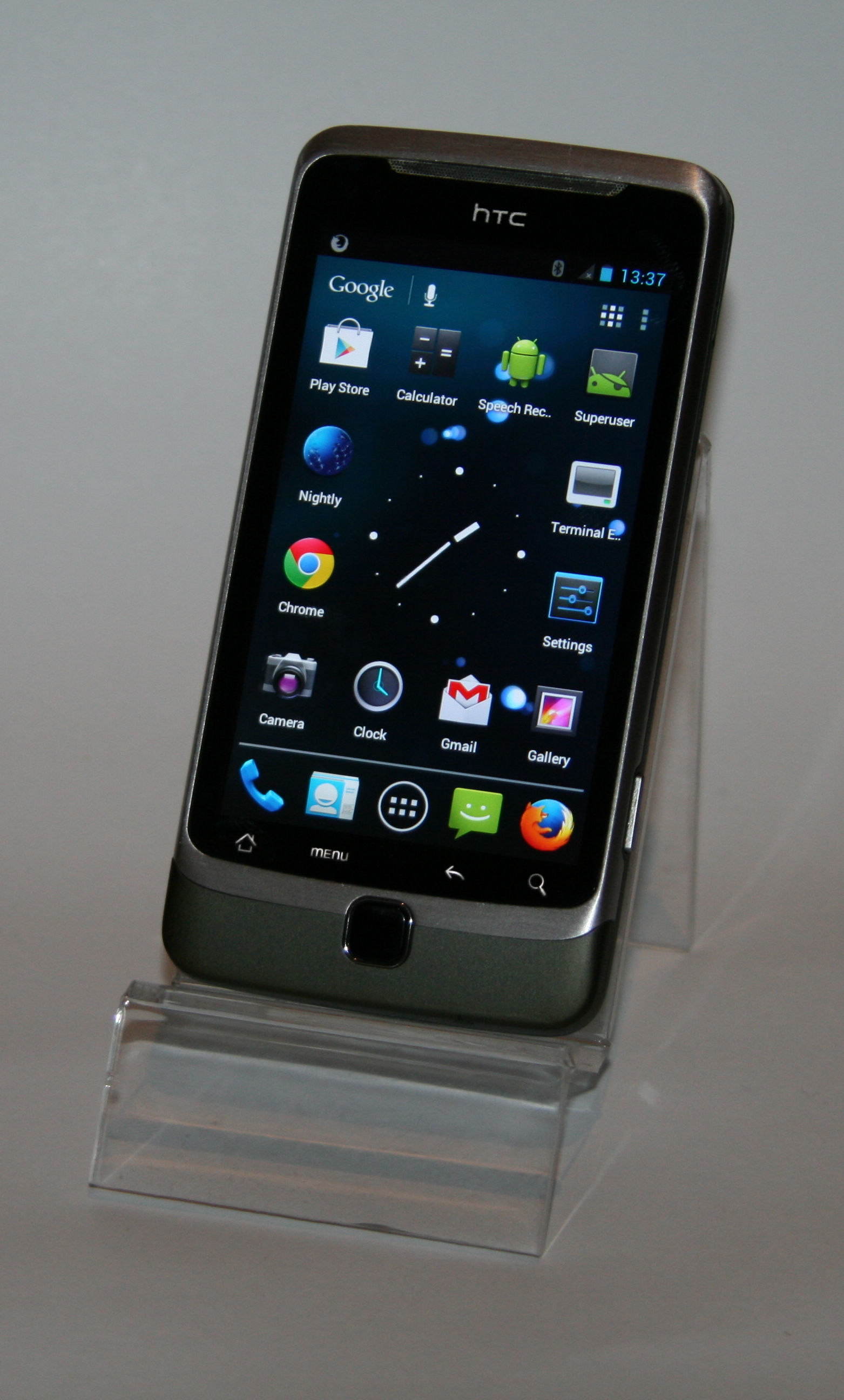

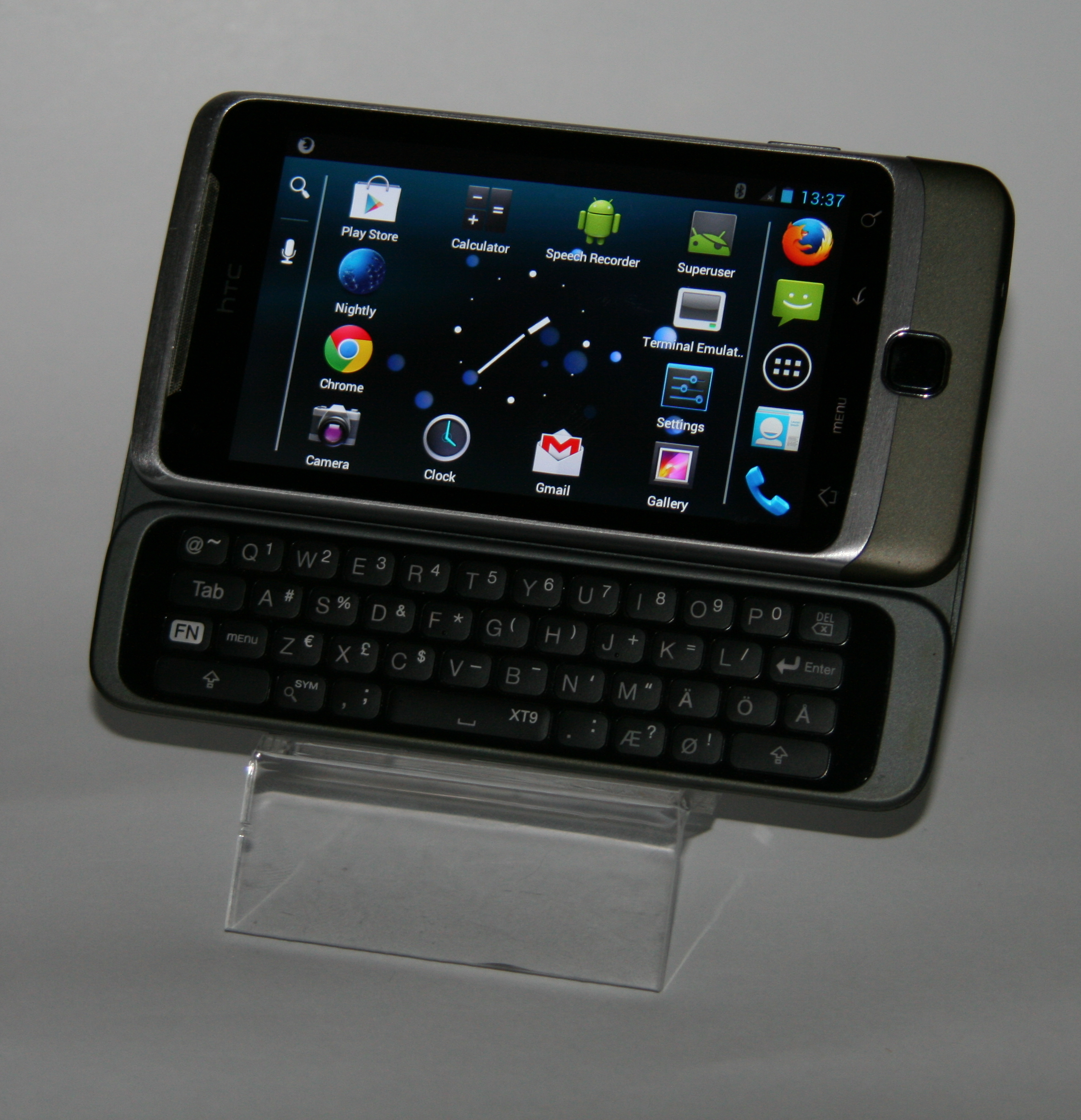
- A HTC Desire Z - shown with keyboard open and closed
- Manufacturer: HTC Corporation
- Series: A Series
- Availability by region: 1 November 2010 (Europe and Canada)
- Predecessor: HTC Dream (T-Mobile G1)
- Compatible networks: 900/2100 or 850/1900 MHz HSPA/WCDMA, 850/900/1800/1900 MHz GSM
- Form factor: Slate slider smartphone
- Dimensions: 119×60.4×14.16 mm (4.685×2.378×0.557 in)
- Weight: 180 g (6 oz)
- Operating system: Original: Android 2.2.1 Froyo; Last: Android 2.3.3 "Gingerbread"
- System-on-chip: Qualcomm Snapdragon MSM7230
- CPU: ARMv7 800 MHz Scorpion
- GPU: Adreno 205
- Memory: 512 MB RAM
- Storage: 1.5 GB Flash
- Removable storage: microSD (SD 2.0 compatible)
- Battery: 1300 mAh Lithium-ion
- Rear camera: 5-megapixel autofocus with LED flash, face detection, geotagging
- Display: 3.7-inch 800 × 480 WVGA Super LCD capacitive touchscreen@ 252 ppi
- Connectivity: 3.5 mm stereo jack, micro-USB hi-speed, Bluetooth 2.1, IEEE 802.11 b/g/n
- Data inputs: Multi-touch with HTC Sense 2.1 interface, QWERTY keyboard, 3-axis accelerometer, digital compass, proximity and ambient light sensors
- Codename: HTC Vision
- Other: Proximity sensor, accelerometer, FM Radio, Facebook, Twitter, MS Exchange, compass, GPS, A-GPS, Google turn-by-turn navigation, Flash 10.1 enabled, upgradable to Flash 10.3

The HTC Desire Z (also marketed as T-Mobile G2 in the US) (codenamed HTC Vision) is a slider-style smartphone developed by HTC Corporation and announced on 15 September 2010. It was released in Europe and Canada in November 2010, following a number of delays related to Google's quality assurance tests. Other than its slider configuration, the Desire Z features specifications similar to the HTC Desire and the HTC Desire HD. The design of the HTC Desire Z has capacitive face buttons rather than the mechanical ones the HTC Desire features.

According to HTC's Vice President Bjorn Kilburn, the phone is the last Google-Assured QWERTY slider to be manufactured by HTC.

== Features ==
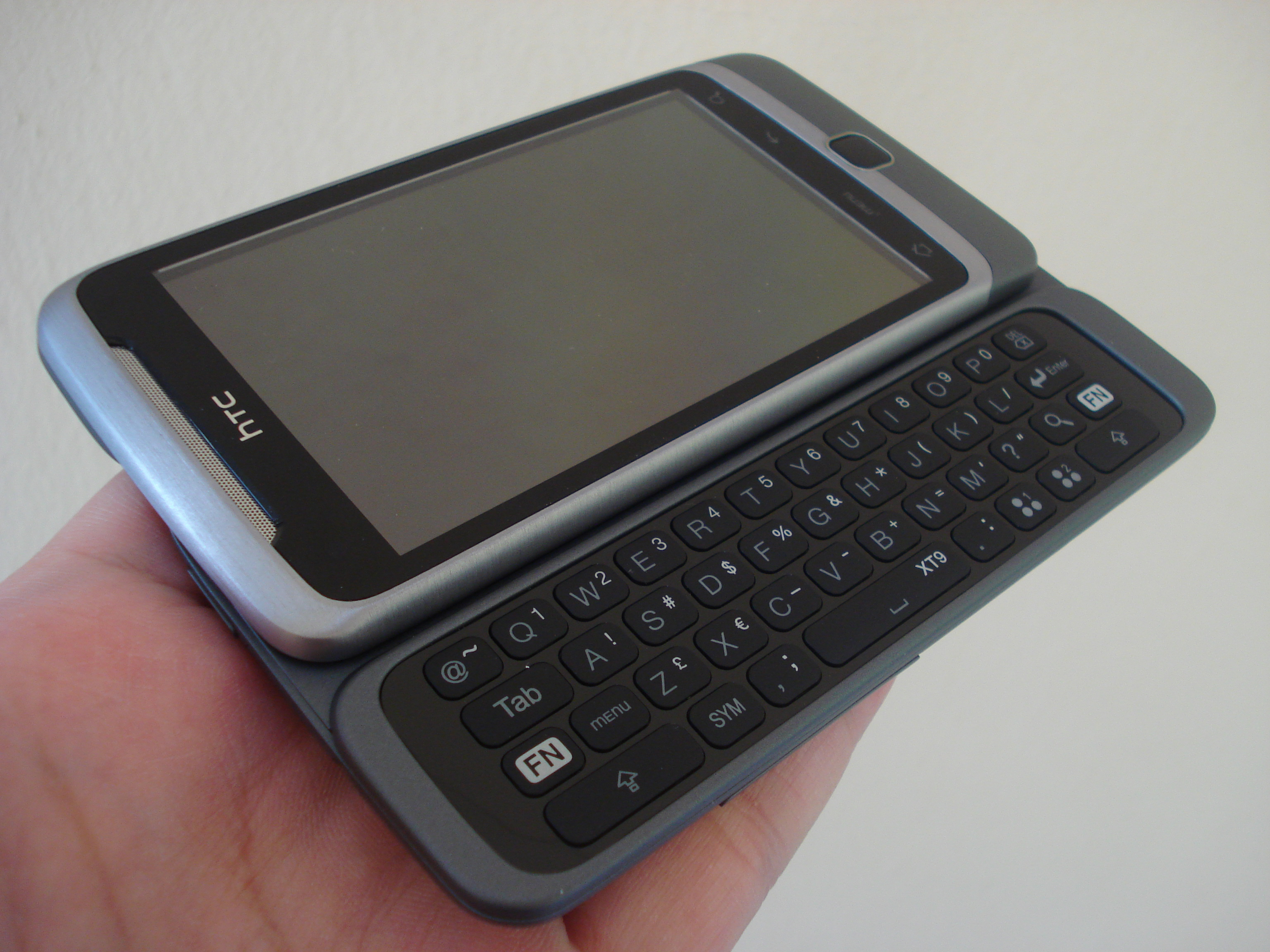
Overview of the keyboard

The HTC Desire Z features an improved version of HTC Sense and online services at HTCSense.com. It has a proximity sensor, a G-sensor and an ambient light sensor. The Desire Z has HTC's new "Fast Boot" feature, which is a type of sleep/hibernation mode instead of the traditional full power off, letting it power on in less than five seconds; a full boot can be accomplished by removing the battery or by restarting the phone from the power menu of Android, which is reached by a long press of the power button. After having been shipped originally with Android 2.2.1 (Froyo), OTA updates have now been pushed which upgraded the firmware to Android 2.3.3 (Gingerbread) with the HTC Sense 2.1. Unofficial versions beyond official 2.3.3 are also available, as well as an early port of Sailfish OS.

== Hardware ==
HTC Desire Z has an aluminium shell and QWERTY keyboard with three programmable keys. The smartphone has an 800 × 480 3.7-inch Super LCD capacitive touchscreen. The HTC Desire Z has a 5-megapixel camera with flash on the rear side. The camera is capable of recording 720p video.

== Reception ==
The reception for the HTC Desire Z has been mixed with some website reviews praising the keyboard typing and citing similar features to the critically acclaimed HTC Desire while others have had complaints about the hinge in the "Z style" sliding out keyboard and the lack of strong battery life.

== Variants ==
T-Mobile USA sold a variant of the Desire Z called the T-Mobile G2, which it discontinued in June 2011. The primary operational difference is that the G2 runs the stock Android interface instead of HTC's customised Sense interface, and that the G2 has 4 GB of internal storage (only 2 GB user accessible, usable equivalent equal to Desire Z) while the Desire Z has 2 GB. The Canadian version of the HTC Desire Z comes with 1.5 GB.

The Scandinavian countries have a modified version of the physical keyboard, where the programmable keys and the right FN key have been replaced by five buttons corresponding to different characters from Scandinavian alphabets.

=== NAND lock ===
As with some previous HTC devices, the G2 has a NAND lock that normally prevents overwriting the operating system unless authorized by the manufacturer. Third parties have overcome this lock and custom operating system builds such as CyanogenMod are available.

== Advertising ==
Bell Mobility was the exclusive carrier of the HTC Desire Z in Canada. The company heavily advertised the Android smartphone, its full QWERTY keyboard and the preinstalled Bell Mobile TV app. Advertisements in NHL locations such as the Scotiabank Place include a boutique where the phone can be purchased, a lighted display panel near big screen TVs, and even most elevator doors featured the smartphone. As of September 2011, Bell discontinued the phone, but the NHL advertisements have yet to be fully replaced.

== See also ==
- Galaxy Nexus
