= Samsung Galaxy (2009 smartphone) =

Smartphone manufactured by Samsung that uses the open source Android operating system

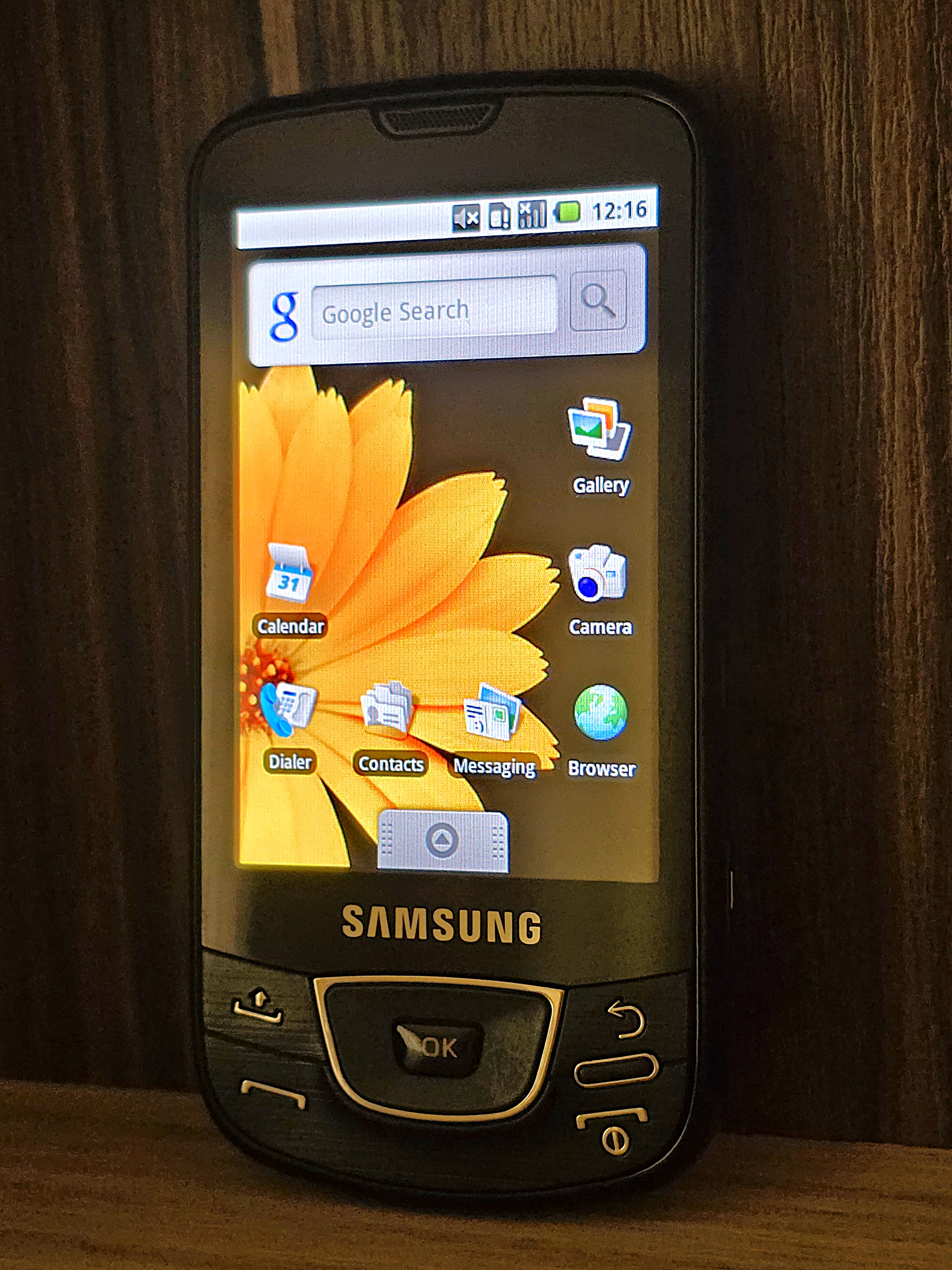
- Samsung Galaxy GT-I7500 on its home screen
- Manufacturer: Samsung Electronics
- Type: Smartphone
- First released: 29 June 2009; 17 years ago
- Successor: Samsung Galaxy S
- Related: Samsung Galaxy Spica
- Compatible networks: HSDPA (3.5G) 900/1700/2100, Quad band GSM / GPRS / EDGE GSM 850, GSM 900, GSM 1800, GSM 1900
- Form factor: Bar
- Dimensions: 115×56×11.9 mm (4.53×2.20×0.47 in)
- Weight: 114 g (4 oz)
- Operating system: Original: Android 1.5 "Cupcake"; Current: Android 1.6 "Donut"; Unofficial: Android 2.3 "Gingerbread" via custom ROMs
- System-on-chip: Qualcomm MSM7200A
- CPU: ARM11 528 MHz + DSP 256 MHz
- GPU: Adreno 130
- Memory: 128 MB RAM
- Storage: 8 GB, 7.6 GB user available
- Removable storage: MicroSD support for up to 32 GB
- Battery: Li-Ion (1500 mAh)
- Rear camera: 5 Megapixels with flash
- Display: 320 x 480 px, 3.2 in, AMOLED, Touchscreen
- Connectivity: USB 2.0, Bluetooth 2.1, Wi-Fi b/g, GPS
- Data inputs: Touchscreen

The Samsung Galaxy is a smartphone manufactured by Samsung that uses the Linux-based Android operating system, which was purchased and further developed by Google and the Open Handset Alliance to create an open competitor to other major smartphone platforms of the time, such as Symbian, BlackBerry OS, and iPhone OS. The operating system offers a customizable graphical user interface, integration with Google services such as Gmail, a notification system that shows a list of recent messages pushed from apps, and Android Market for downloading additional apps.

The device was announced on 27 April 2009 and was released on 29 June 2009 as the first Samsung Mobile device to use the Android operating system introduced in the HTC Dream (marketed as the T-Mobile G1), and the first in what would become the long-running Galaxy series. It was succeeded by the Samsung Galaxy S in 2010.

== Features ==
The Galaxy is a smartphone, offering quad-band GSM and announced with tri-band HSDPA (900/1700/2100) at 7.2 Mbit/s (however, Samsung's official pages for the Danish, Finnish, Norwegian and Swedish versions only mention dual-band UMTS 900/2100). The phone features a 3.2-inch AMOLED capacitive touchscreen, a 5 megapixel autofocus camera with power LED flash, and a digital compass. Unlike the first Android phone, the HTC Dream (known as the T-Mobile G1 in the USA), the i7500 has a standard 3.5 mm headphone jack, and a Directional Pad in place of a trackball.

The Samsung Galaxy offers a variety of Google mobile services, including Google Search, Gmail, YouTube, Google Calendar, and Google Talk. The phone's GPS enables Google Maps features such as My Location and Google Latitude. It also supports MP3, AAC (including iTunes Plus downloads) (only the codec, not the .aac format), and H.264 video. A beta version of the Spotify music streaming service was also available for this phone via the Android Market.

== Criticism ==
Due to lack of software updates, Samsung received some or most criticism from original Galaxy users.

For some countries, Samsung updated the Galaxy's Android software to Android Donut (1.6). Users from other countries could download and update manually at the risk of dangerously bricking the device.

== See also ==
- Samsung i8000 Omnia II, Samsung's Windows Mobile flagship at the time
- Samsung i8910 Omnia HD, Samsung's Symbian flagship phone at the time
- Samsung S8000 Jet, Samsung's mid-range proprietary phone at the time

Preceded by None	Samsung Galaxy; 2009	Succeeded by Samsung Galaxy S
