= Android 1.x =

Android 1.x may refer to:

- Android 1.0
- Android 1.1
- Android Cupcake (1.5)
- Android Donut (1.6)
