= Samsung Galaxy 3 =

Android smartphone manufactured by Samsung

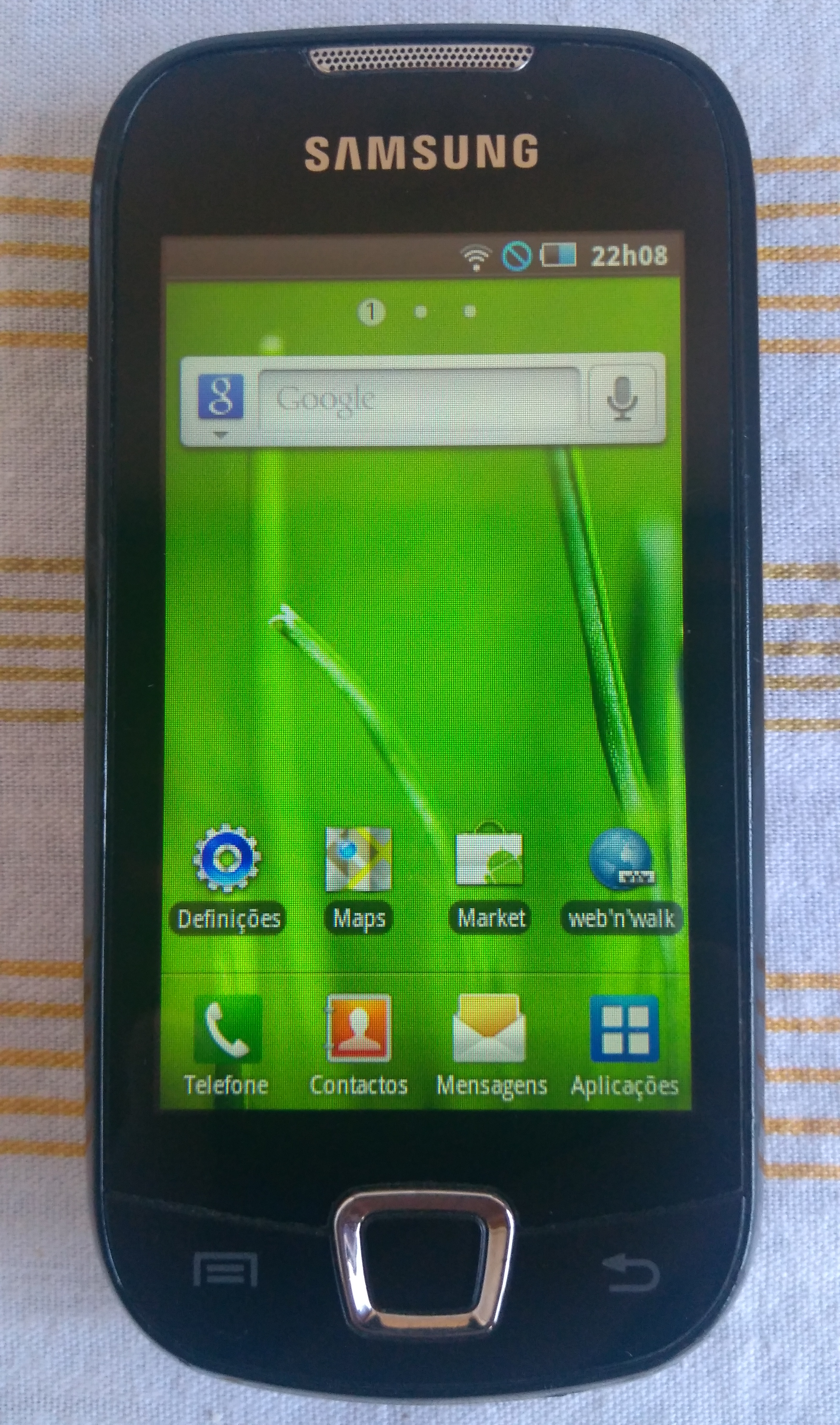
- Manufacturer: Samsung
- Series: Galaxy
- Predecessor: Samsung Galaxy Spica
- Successor: Samsung Galaxy Ace
- Compatible networks: HSDPA (3G) 900/2100, Quad band GSM / GPRS / EDGE GSM 850, GSM 900, GSM 1800, GSM 1900
- Form factor: Slate
- Dimensions: 113.5×55×12.9 mm (4.47×2.17×0.51 in)
- Weight: 109 g (4 oz)
- Operating system: Original: Android 2.1 "Eclair"; Current: Android 2.2 "Froyo"
- CPU: Samsung S5P6422 667 MHz
- GPU: FIMG 3DSE
- Memory: 256 MB RAM
- Storage: 512 MB (170 MB user-accessible)
- Removable storage: MicroSD support for up to 32 GB
- Battery: Li-Ion 1500 mAh. Stand-by: Up to 620 h (2G); Up to 510 h (3G); Talk time: Up to 15 h 30 min (2G); Up to 7 h 15 min (3G)
- Rear camera: 3 Mpix (official spec), autofocus. Video: recording in 3GP (MPEG+AMR-nb); MP4, 3GP playback
- Display: WQVGA TFT LCD, 3.2 in (82 mm) diagonal. 240 x 400 px, 16 M colors
- Sound: MP3, AMR, AAC, AAC+, e-AAC+, WMA, WAV, OGG, MID
- Connectivity: USB 2.0, Bluetooth 3.0, Wi-Fi 802.11 b/g/n, GPS
- Data inputs: Touch Screen (capacitive)

The Samsung Galaxy 3, also known as the Samsung Galaxy Apollo, Samsung Galaxy Mini in Italy, or Samsung Galaxy 580 in Hong Kong, is a smartphone manufactured by Samsung that runs the open source Android operating system. Announced and released by Samsung in July 2010, the Galaxy 3 succeeds the Samsung Galaxy Spica.

Being a budget, mid-range smartphone that was designed for the mass market, the Galaxy 3 had several compromises over the Galaxy S in terms of hardware.

It was being the first Samsung Galaxy model to be made and sold in high volumes (unlike Galaxy Spica and i7500, which were not that successful), forcing the rest of the mobile industry to follow suit.

The Galaxy Apollo is a variant of the Galaxy 3 that is also known as the GT-I5800. This was also released as carrier-exclusive sub-variants by Orange (i5801) in the UK, Optimus (i5801) in Portugal and by Telus Mobility (i5800L / Samsung Apollo) in Canada. Compared to the normal Apollo/I5800, the carrier-exclusive models include a different front design, which has touch sensitive buttons instead of physical keys, a more rounded home button, and a slightly different back.

The Samsung Galaxy 3 won bronze of the CNET Asia Reader's Choice Award for Best Entry-Level Smartphone in 2010.

== Features ==
The Galaxy 3 is a 3.5G smartphone, offering quad-band GSM and announced with two-band HSDPA (900/2100) at 3.6 Mbit/s. The phone features a 3.2 inch TFT LCD capacitive touchscreen, with a 3.2-megapixel autofocus camera. FM radio RDS chip. Powered by a Samsung 667 MHz processor running on top of 256 MB of RAM and the display resolution is 240 x 400 with 16 million colors, the phone runs on Android 2.1 Eclair and TouchWiz 3.0. Known for its social network integration capabilities and multimedia features, the Galaxy 3 is also preloaded with Google Mobile Apps and Layar to provide augmented reality features.

== Firmware upgrade ==
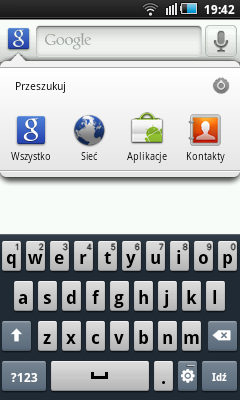
Screenshot from Android 2.2 on i5800

An update to Android 2.2 (Froyo) has been released by Samsung in some regions. Near the start of 2011, the upgrade was stated as in progress, scheduled for release by late-January 2011 in Singapore, which has been indefinitely delayed, and April 2011 for Europe.

The update to Android 2.2 (Froyo) was released on 13 April 2011 for Indian users via Samsung Kies. On 13 May 2011, the updated Quick Guides for the UK and Cyprus, relating to a Froyo version of the device, were published to the Samsung web site indicating an imminent release of the firmware update. Months later in the second half of 2011, the Froyo update was officially released in Greece and the UK through Kies.

=== Unofficials ===
Unofficially, members at XDA Developers have ported :

- GingerBread – Android version v2.3.x – FORUM LINK
- Ice Cream Sandwich- Android version v4.0.3 – FORUM LINK
- Jelly Bean – Android version v4.1.1 – FORUM LINK

Although it had few bugs, users heartily welcomed them and use them on their devices.

Currently, a port for Jelly Bean – Android version v4.1.1 is being worked on. As of 18 September 2012, Jelly Bean port has been a huge success since only the camera is not working in that port. Another team of developers is working towards creating a new kernel. It is based on the latest linux kernel v3.4. On completing this project, developers will be freed from using Samsung's kernel source, which lacks required drivers making earlier ports highly complex. This will also ensure that any future Android version can be made to run on this device.

== See also ==
- List of Android devices
- Samsung Galaxy Ace
- Samsung Galaxy S (2010 smartphone)
- Samsung Galaxy 5
- Samsung Galaxy Tab 7.0
- Galaxy Nexus
