= Samsung Continuum =

Mobile phone model

Samsung Continuum i400
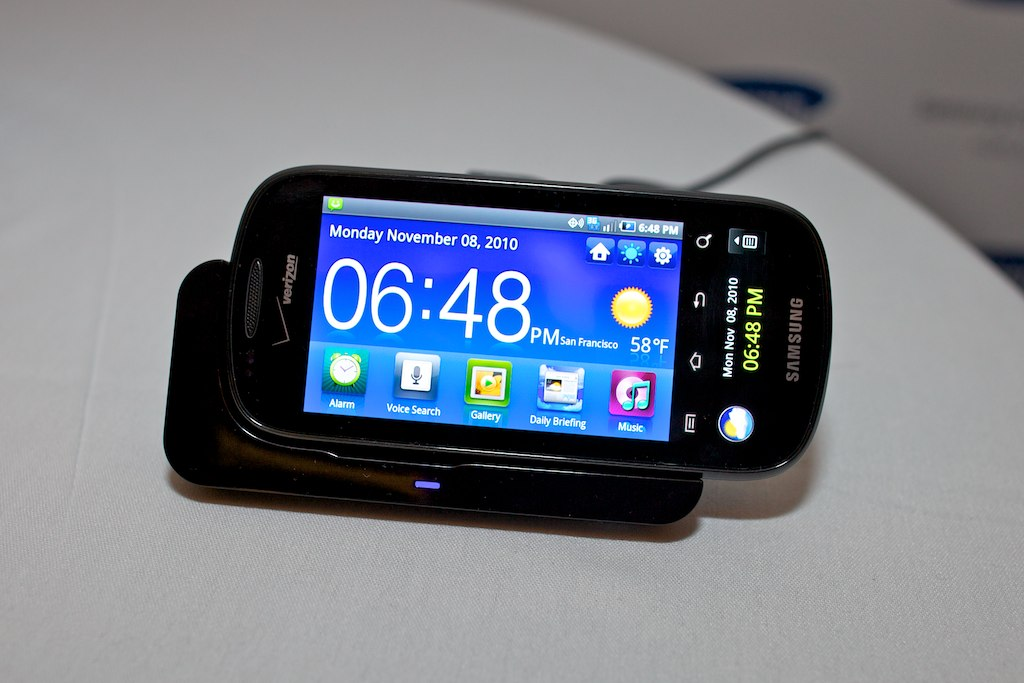
- Manufacturer: Samsung Electronics
- Type: Touchscreen smartphone (Android)
- Series: Samsung Galaxy
- First released: 4 June 2010
- Predecessor: Samsung i7500
- Successor: Samsung Galaxy S II
- Form factor: Slate (most versions); Slider (Sprint version)
- Operating system: Android 2.1 "Eclair" with TouchWiz UI 3.0
- System-on-chip: Samsung Exynos 3 (previously known as S5PC110, Hummingbird, Exynos 3110)
- CPU: 1 GHz single-core (ARM Cortex A8)
- GPU: 200 MHz PowerVR SGX 540
- Memory: 394 MB RAM
- Storage: 2048 MB NAND flash
- Removable storage: micro-SD (up to 64 GB supported)
- Battery: Li-po
- Rear camera: 5 MP with auto focus; 720p HD video (12 Mb/s); auto-focus; self-shot, action, panorama, smile shot; face detection; anti-shake; add me
- Display: 4.0 in (100 mm) Super AMOLED with RGBG-Matrix (Pentile); 800×480 px WVGA (233 ppi) with secondary ticker display
- External display: TV out via headphone jack, mDNIe via WiFi (HD)
- Sound: SoundAlive, 16 kHz 64 kbit/s mono in HD video recording
- Connectivity: 3.5 mm TRRS; Wi-Fi 802.11b/g/n; DLNA; Bluetooth 3.0; micro-USB 2.0; FM radio with RDS with recording
- Data inputs: Multi-touch capacitive touchscreen display, Ambient light sensor, microphone, 3-axis Magnetometer (Compass), aGPS, 3-axis accelerometer, stereo FM radio with RDS and Swype
- Other: Second screen bottom ticker, TV out, integrated messaging Social Hub, Google Play, GALAXY Apps, A-GPS, Augmented reality with Layar Reality Browser, video messaging, Exchange ActiveSync (offline and no SIM Mode), voice command, RSS reader, Widgets, Smart security
- Website: Samsung-Continuum i400

The Samsung Continuum (i400) is an Android device produced by Samsung Electronics in 2010. It included a unique feature of a bottom "ticker" display that allowed for notifications and multitasking. Some people consider the successor to this device to be the Galaxy Note Edge which also included the unique second portion of screen for notifications and multitasking.
