= ASEC =

ASEC or asec may refer to:

== Science and technology ==
- Absolute size-exclusion chromatography
- asec or arcsecant, an inverse trigonometric function
- Arcseconds or seconds of arc, a unit of angle
- .asec, the file extension of an Android secure encrypted file

== Organisations ==
- ASEC Mimosas, a football club
- ASEC Ndiambour, a football club
- Alberta Students' Executive Council, an organization of post-secondary student leaders in Alberta, Canada
- Action Sports Environmental Coalition, a nonprofit organization co-founded by Bob Burnquist

== Other ==
- Annual Social and Economic Supplement, a supplement to the Current Population Survey from the United States Census Bureau
