= Cyanogen (disambiguation) =

Cyanogen is a chemical compound.

Cyanogen may also refer to:

- CyanogenMod, an open-source operating system for mobile devices
