= Froyo =

Froyo may refer to:

- Frozen yogurt, a dessert
- Android Froyo, version 2.2 of the mobile operating system
