= Android Dev Phone =

Unlocked Android phone used for development purposes

The Android Dev Phone (ADP) was a series of SIM-unlocked and bootloader unlocked Android devices designed for advanced developers. While developers can use regular consumer devices purchased at retail to test and use their apps, some developers may choose not to use a retail device, preferring an unlocked or no-contract device.

The Google Nexus series was the de facto successor of Android Development Phones, with the Google Pixel series coming after.

== Android Dev Phone 1 ==
On December 5, 2008, Google announced the Android Dev Phone 1, a version of the HTC Dream. The Android Dev Phone 1 was a SIM-unlocked and bootloader unlocked device that was designed for advanced developers. The device shipped with Android 1.0. It was possible to use any SIM in the device and one could flash custom Android builds that would work with the unlocked bootloader. Unlike the bootloader on retail devices, the bootloader on the Android Dev Phone 1 did not enforce signed system images. The Android Dev Phone 1 also appealed to developers who live outside T-Mobile geographies. The device itself cost $399 (USD) (including free shipping in the US). Google stated that "The Android Dev Phone 1 devices are not intended for non-developer end-users. Because the device can be configured with system software not provided by or supported by Google or any other company, end-users operate these devices at their own risk."

=== System access and copy protection ===
Applications developed for distribution on Google Play allow the developer to enable copy protection which prevents the end user from copying the application from the phone. Because the Android Dev Phone allows unrestricted access to the OS, this copy protection is disabled. If the developer enables copy protection on their application, then the application does not appear on Google Play for the Dev Phone.

=== Availability ===
The device was available for purchase in 19 international markets, including United States, United Kingdom, Germany, Japan, India, Canada, France, Taiwan, Spain, Australia, Singapore, Switzerland, Netherlands, Austria, Sweden, Finland, Poland, Egypt and Hungary.

=== Hardware specifications ===
- Touch screen
- Trackball
- 3.2 megapixel camera with autofocus
- Wi-Fi
- GPS-enabled
- Bluetooth v2.0
  - Handsfree profile v1.5
  - Headset profile v1
- 3G WCDMA (1700/2100 MHz)
- Quad-band GSM (850/900/1800/1900 MHz)
- 256 MB flash memory
- 192 MB RAM
- QWERTY slider keyboard
- Includes 1 GB MicroSD card (can be replaced with 16 GB card)

== Android Dev Phone 2 ==
The Android Dev Phone 2 was a hardware unlocked version of the HTC Magic. The Android Dev Phone 2 was a SIM-unlocked and bootloader unlocked device that was designed for advanced developers. The device shipped with Android 1.6. It was possible to use any SIM in the device and one could flash custom Android builds that would work with the unlocked bootloader. Unlike the bootloader on retail devices, the bootloader on the Android Dev Phone 2 does not enforce signed system images. The Android Dev Phone 2 should also appealed to developers who live outside T-Mobile geographies. The device itself cost $399 (USD) (including free shipping in the US)."

=== Availability ===
The device is available for purchase in 21 international markets, including United States, United Kingdom, Germany, Japan, India, Canada, France, Taiwan, Spain, Australia, Singapore, Switzerland, Netherlands, New Zealand, Austria, Sweden, Estonia, Finland, Poland, Egypt and Hungary.

=== Hardware specifications ===
- 3.0 megapixel camera with autofocus
- Wi-Fi 802.11b/g
- A-GPS-enabled
- Bluetooth v2.0 with EDR
- 3G WCDMA (1700/2100 MHz)
- Quad-band GSM (850/900/1800/1900 MHz)
- 512 MB flash memory
- 288 MB RAM
- MicroSD card slot
- USB 2.0
- 1340 mAh Battery

== See also ==
- Android rooting
