= .asec =

Android encrypted file format

- Filename extension: .asec
- Developed by: Google

.asec is the filename extension of an Android secure encrypted (ASEC) file. This file extension is specifically associated with Google's Android operating system. It was first introduced with Android 2.2 (codenamed Froyo) in May 2010.

The purpose of ASEC is to prevent existing applications from being modified or corrupted by other programs. Applications moved to an SD card are encrypted and stored there in an ASEC file. These files can then be found under the .android_secure folder on the SD card. If an application is moved back to its device's local storage, the file is decrypted from the ASEC file format to a basic APK (Android Package) file format.
