= Android Donut =

2009 Android mobile operating system

- Version of the Android operating system

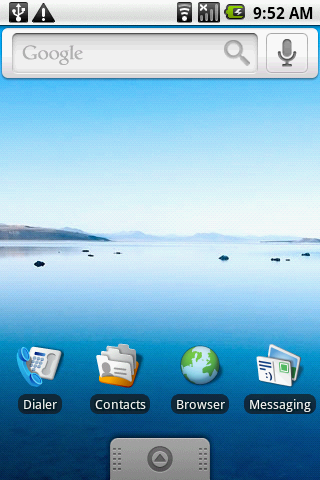
- Android 1.6 running on an HTC Dream
- Developer: Google
- General availability: September 15, 2009; 17 years ago
- Final release: 1.6_r1.5
- Kernel type: Monolithic (Linux)
- Preceded by: Android Cupcake (1.5)
- Succeeded by: Android Eclair (2.0)
- Official website: developer.android.com/about/versions/android-1.6-highlights

Support status
- Unsupported; Android Market support dropped since June 30, 2017; Google Account support dropped on September 27, 2021

Android Donut is version 1.6 and the fourth major version of the Android mobile operating system. It was first previewed on May 27, 2009. On September 15, 2009, on the convention hosted by Google to designate major Android versions, carriers rolled it out with an update to compatible smartphones. The first phone to use Android 1.6 was the T-Mobile G1, and the first phone to have launched with Android 1.6 was the HTC Magic smartphone. Updates for Android Market stopped in 2014, but was completely shut down on June 30, 2017. On September 27, 2021, it was no longer possible to sign-in on Android 2.3.7 (Gingerbread) or earlier without Google Account Manager.

Among the more prominent features introduced with this update were added support for CDMA smartphones, additional screen sizes, a battery usage indicator, and a text-to-speech engine.

== Features ==
New features introduced by Donut include the following:

- Voice and text entry search enhanced to include bookmark history, contacts, and the web.
- The ability for developers to include their content in search results.
- Multi-lingual speech synthesis engine to allow any Android application to "speak" a string of text.
- Easier searching and the ability to view app screenshots in Android Market.
- Gallery, Camera, and camcorder are more fully integrated, with faster camera access.
- The ability for users to select multiple photos for deletion.
- Updated technology support for CDMA/EVDO, 802.1x, VPNs, and a text-to-speech engine.
- Support for WVGA screen resolutions.
- Speed improvements in searching and camera applications.
- Expanded Gesture framework and a new GestureBuilder development tool

== See also ==
- Android version history
- iPhone OS 3
- Mac OS X Snow Leopard
- Windows Mobile 6.5
- Windows 7
