= HTC Dream =

2008 Android smartphone designed by HTC

HTC Dream/T-Mobile G1

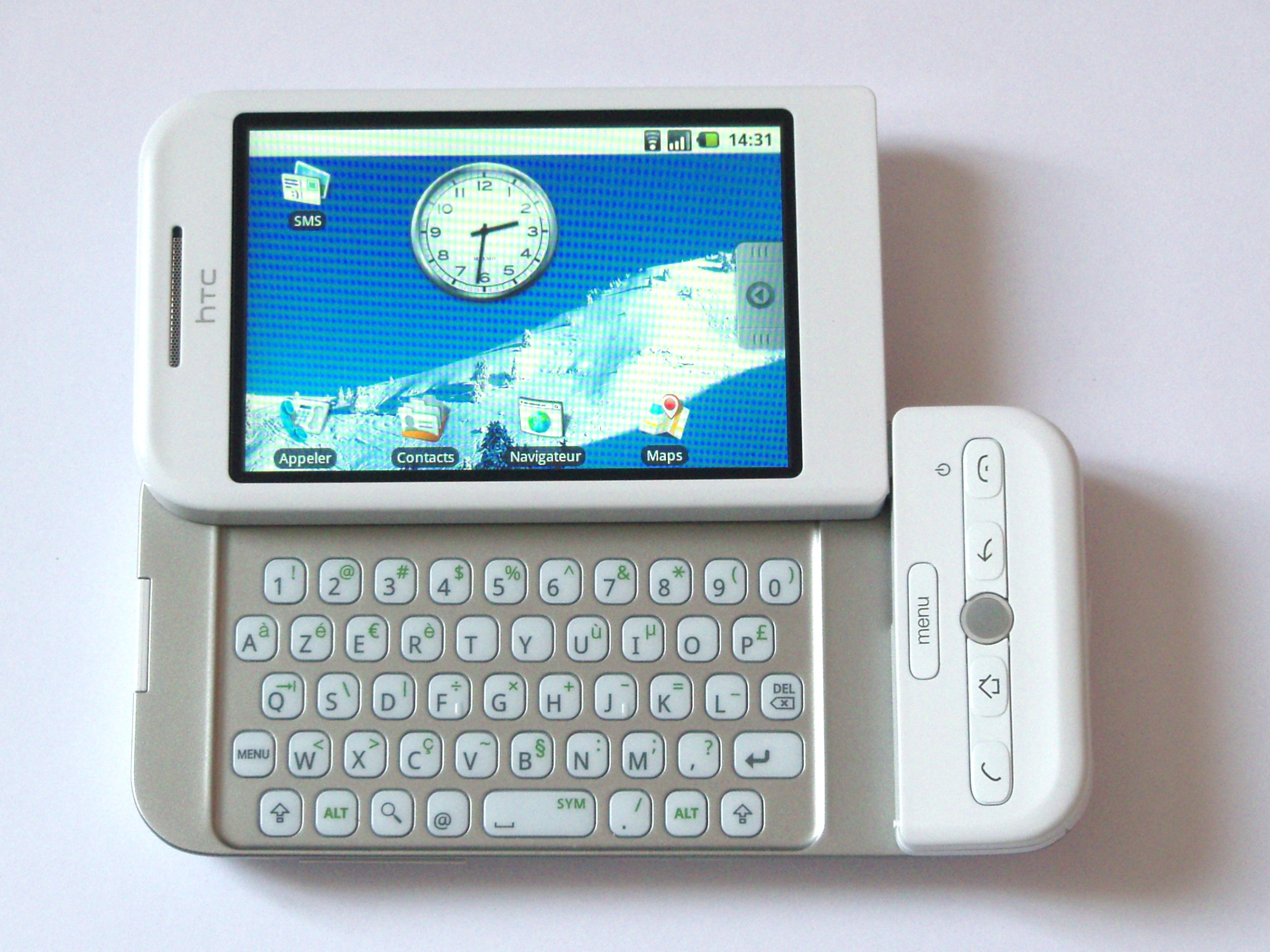
- A white Orange HTC Dream with an AZERTY keyboard
- Also known as: T-Mobile G1
- Developer: Google and HTC
- Manufacturer: HTC
- First released: 20 October 2008; 18 years ago
- Predecessor: Google Sooner
- Successor: HTC Magic, HTC Desire Z (T-Mobile G2), Nexus One
- Form factor: Slider smartphone
- Dimensions: 117.7 × 55.7 × 17.1 mm (4.63 × 2.19 × 0.67 in)
- Weight: 158 g (5.6 oz)
- Operating system: Original: Android 1.0; Last: Android 1.6 "Donut"
- CPU: 528 MHz Qualcomm MSM7201A ARM11
- Memory: 192 MB RAM
- Storage: 256 MB
- Removable storage: microSD, up to 16 GB
- Battery: 1150 mAh; Internal rechargeable removable lithium-ion battery
- Rear camera: 3.15 megapixel, autofocus
- Display: 320 × 480 px, 3.2 in (81 mm), HVGA, 65,536 color TFT-LCD at 180 pixels per inch (ppi)
- Connectivity: Wi-Fi (802.11b/g), Bluetooth 2.0+EDR, ExtUSB, A-GPS; Quad-band GSM 850 900 1800 1900 MHz GPRS/EDGE; Dual band UMTS 1700 2100 MHz HSDPA/HSUPA (US/Europe) (7.2/2 Mbit/s)
- Data inputs: Capacitive touchscreen display, keyboard, trackball, volume controls, 3-axis accelerometer
- Website: G1 on htc.com at the Wayback Machine (archived 2008-11-12)

The HTC Dream (also known as the T-Mobile G1 in the United States and parts of Europe, and as the Era G1 in Poland) is a smartphone developed by HTC. First released in October 2008 for US$179 (equivalent to $268 in 2025) with a 2-year contract to T-Mobile, the Dream was the first commercially released device to use the Linux-based Android operating system, which was purchased and further developed by Google and the Open Handset Alliance to create an open competitor to other major smartphone platforms of the time, such as Symbian, BlackBerry OS, and iPhone OS. The operating system offers a customizable graphical user interface, integration with Google services such as Gmail, a notification system that shows a list of recent messages pushed from apps, and Android Market for downloading additional apps.

The HTC Dream was released to a mostly positive reception. While the Dream was praised for its solid and robust hardware design, the introduction of the Android operating system was met with criticism for its lack of "un-iOSness" and third-party software in comparison to more established platforms, but was still considered to be innovative due to its open nature, notifications system, and heavy integration with Google services, like Gmail.

== History ==
=== Development ===
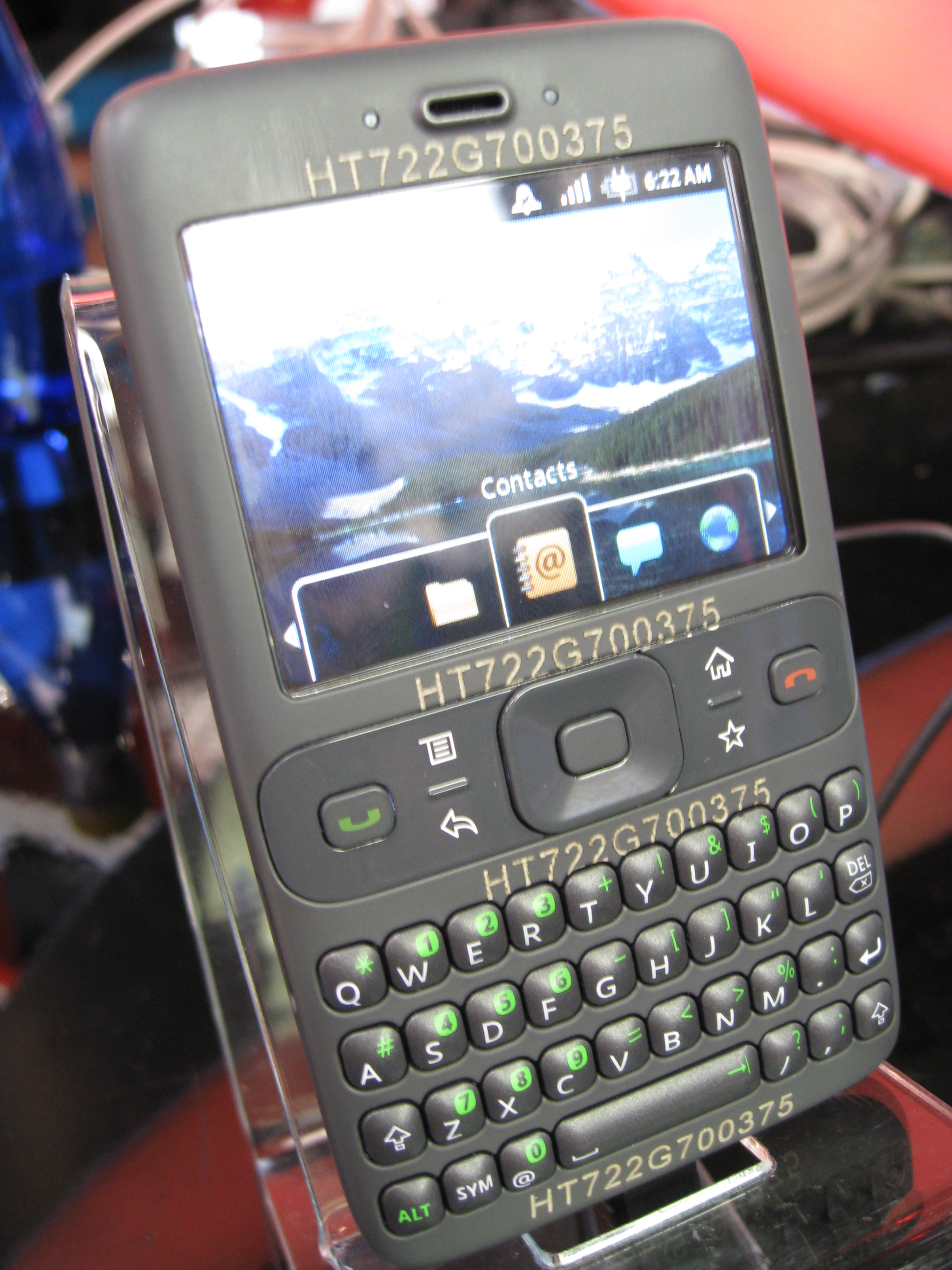
The "Sooner" prototype was shelved in favor of the Dream.

In July 2005, Google acquired Android Inc., a company led by Andy Rubin which was working on unspecified software for mobile devices. Under the leadership of Google, the team was in the process of developing a standardized, Linux-based operating system for mobile phones to compete against the likes of Symbian and Windows Mobile, which would be offered for use by individual original equipment manufacturers. Initial development of what would become Android was targeted towards a prototype device codenamed "Sooner"; the device was a messaging phone in the style of BlackBerry, with a small, non-touch screen, navigation keys, and a physical QWERTY keyboard. The January 2007 unveiling of the iPhone, Apple's first smartphone, and its pioneering design aspects, caught Rubin off guard and led to a change in course for the project. The operating system's design was quickly reworked, and attention shifted to a new prototype device codenamed "Dream"—a touchscreen device with a sliding, physical keyboard. The inclusion of a physical keyboard was intentional, as Android developers recognized users did not like the idea of a virtual keyboard as they lacked the physical feedback that makes hardware keyboards useful.

The Android operating system was officially unveiled in November 2007 along with the founding of the Open Handset Alliance (OHA); a consortium of hardware, software, and telecommunication companies devoted to advancing open standards for mobile devices. These companies included Google, along with HTC, a company which was at the time, one of the largest manufacturers of phones. While Google indicated in 2008 that several Linux devices were being tested in preparation for the official public launch of Android, only one was to be released in the United States that year—the HTC Dream. Plans called for the Dream to be released on T-Mobile USA by the end of the year (with some reports suggesting October 2008), targeting the holiday shopping season. Sprint had worked with the OHA, but had not yet unveiled any plans to release an Android phone of its own, while Verizon Wireless and AT&T did not have any plans for Android devices yet at all.

=== Release ===
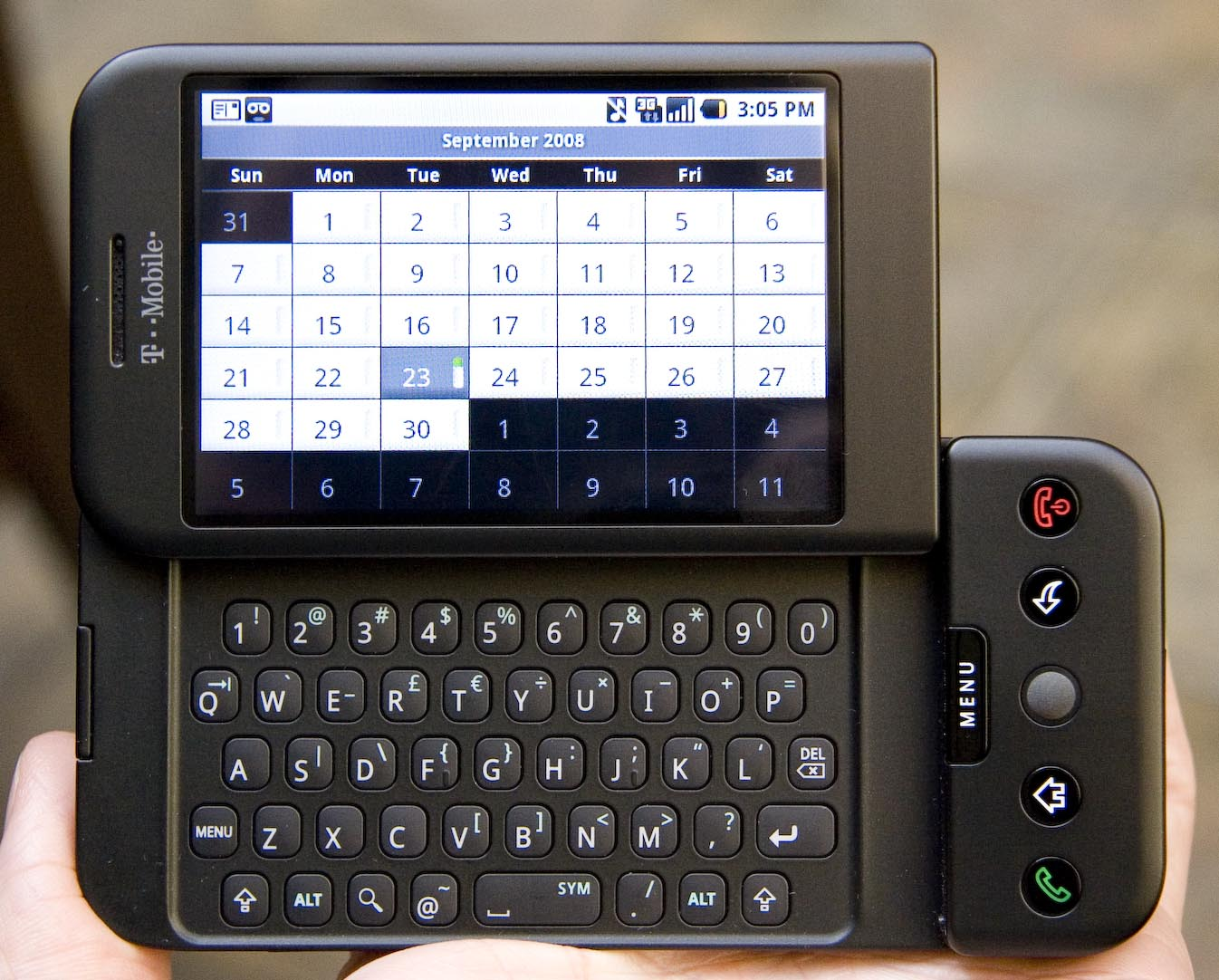
A bronze T-Mobile G1 carrier-branded version of the Dream

HTC officially announced the Dream on 23 September 2008. It would first be released by T-Mobile as the T-Mobile G1, starting in the United States on 20 October 2008 in its 3G-enabled markets only (it became available in all markets on 24 January 2009), followed by a British release in November 2008, and a release in other European territories in early 2009. On 10 March 2009, it became available in Poland as the Era G1 on Era. On 2 June 2009, both the Dream and its successor (the HTC Magic) were released by Rogers Wireless in Canada.

The Dream was discontinued by T-Mobile on 27 July 2010. The G1 was spiritually succeeded in October 2010 by the T-Mobile G2, a new HTC device which also featured stock Android and a sliding keyboard, and was T-Mobile USA's first "4G" smartphone. In Canada, Rogers suspended sales of the Dream on 15 January 2010 due to a bug affecting the proper use of emergency calls.

== Features ==
=== Hardware ===
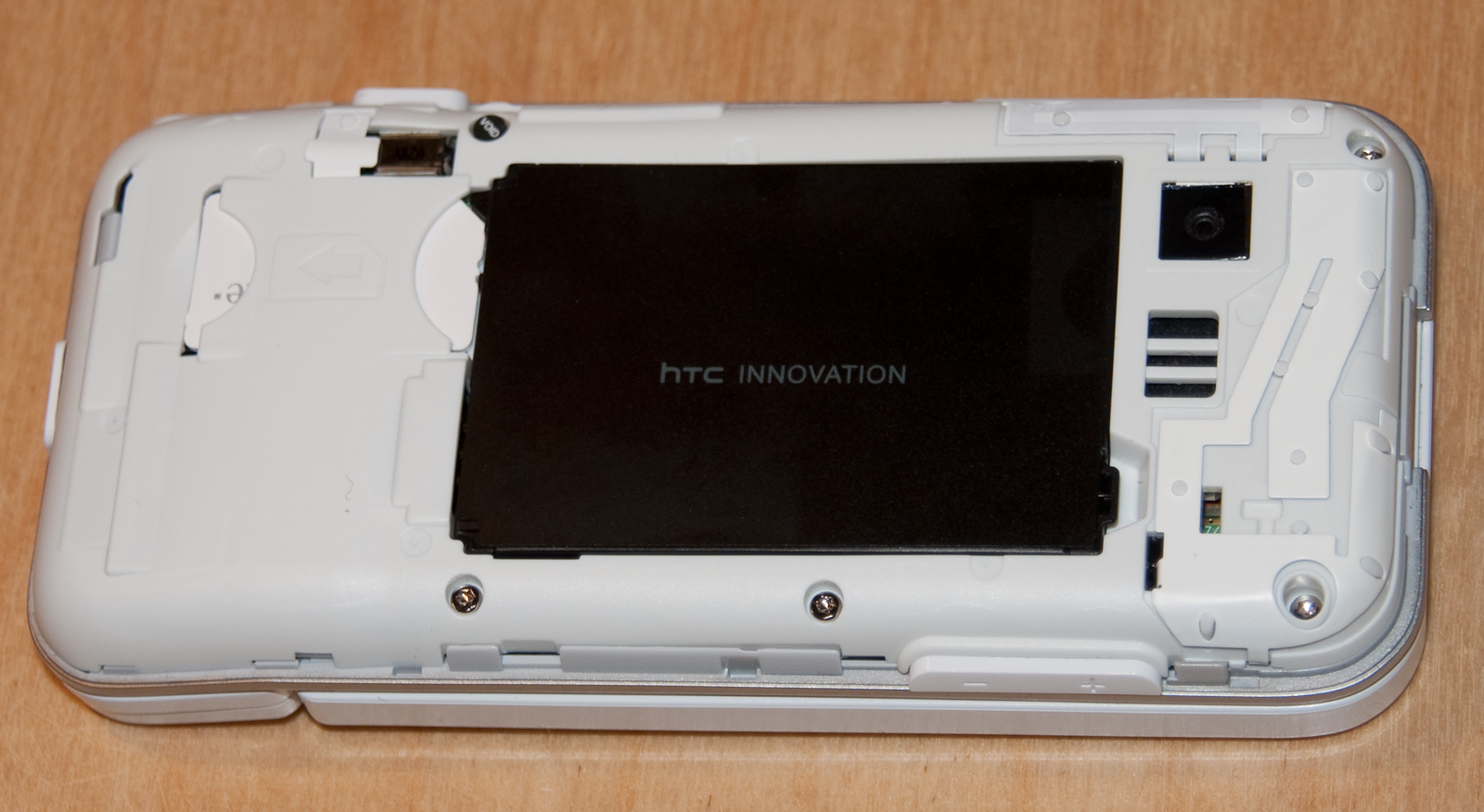
A white HTC Dream with back cover removed

The Dream's exterior uses a soft, smooth matte plastic shell, and was made available in white, black, and bronze colors. The Dream's design features a distinctive "chin" on the bottom, which houses 5 navigation buttons ("Call", "Home", "Menu", "Back", and "End Call") and a clickable trackball in the center which can be used for scrolling and selecting. The device uses a 3.2 inches (8.1 cm) capacitive touchscreen LCD at a resolution of 320×480; the screen can be slid along a curved hinge to expose a five-row QWERTY keyboard—as the first releases of Android did not include a virtual keyboard, the keyboard was originally the only method of text input on the device. While supporting multitouch at the hardware level, the Linux kernel in the Dream's Android distribution was patched to remove multitouch support from its touchscreen drivers for undisclosed reasons. The Dream does not include a traditional headphone jack, requiring an adapter for HTC's proprietary (but Mini-USB compatible) "ExtUSB" port located on the bottom of the device. The rear of the device houses a 3.15-megapixel rear camera with auto-focus.

The Dream uses a 528 MHz Qualcomm MSM7201A system on a chip with 192 MB of RAM, and comes with 256 MB of internal storage, which can be expanded by up to 16 GB using a Micro SD card slot. For network connectivity, the Dream supports Quad-band GSM 850/900/1800/1900 MHz and GPRS/EDGE, plus Dual band UMTS Bands I and IV (1700 & 2100 MHz) and HSDPA/HSUPA (in US/Europe) at 7.2/2 Mbit/s. The device also supports standalone GPS and A-GPS.

=== Software ===
The HTC Dream was the first ever smartphone to include the Android operating system. The operating system heavily integrates with, and provides apps for various Google services, such as Gmail (with push email support), Maps, Search, Talk, and YouTube, while the contacts and calendar apps can sync with the online Google Contacts and Google Calendar services respectively. The device also ships with an email app supporting other POP3 and IMAP-based mail services, an instant messaging app with support for multiple services, and a WebKit-based web browser. A notification system displays icons for certain events (such as e-mails and text messages) on the left side of the status bar across the top of the screen; dragging down from the top of the screen exposes a tray with more detailed information for each notification. The Android Market can be used to download additional apps for the device. The G1 as sold by T-Mobile also shipped with an Amazon MP3 app, allowing users to purchase DRM-free music online, and download it straight to the device via Wi-Fi.

The Dream could also be upgraded to newer versions of Android, which added new features and enhancements to the platform. The latest version of Android officially made available for the Dream, 1.6 "Donut", was released for T-Mobile USA's G1 in October 2009. The 1.6 update was not released on the Rogers HTC Dream in Canada (which stayed on 1.5 "Cupcake"); Rogers claimed that the update was only being made available for "'Google'-branded" models of the device.

== Development and modding ==
Due to the open source nature of the Android platform, the Dream became a popular target for modding. Shortly after the release of the Dream, developers discovered a software exploit which would allow a user to gain superuser access to the phone—a process which would be referred to as "rooting". As a parallel to "jailbreaking" on iOS devices, root access would enable users to perform tweaks and other changes at the system level that cannot be performed under normal circumstances (such as adding auto-rotation, and installing a custom kernel that restored the aforementioned multitouch support).

After the Dream's bootloader was dumped, work began on modifying it so that it could install third-party firmware, and on converting official Android update files into a format that could be installed using the modified bootloader. Around the same time, Google made the Android Dev Phone 1 available for registered Android developers; the Dev Phone 1 was a SIM- and hardware-unlocked version of the HTC Dream that came pre-configured for superuser access to the internal files of the phone, allowing users to completely replace the bootloader and operating system.

As a result of these developments, a dedicated community, centered on forums such as XDA Developers, emerged surrounding the creation of custom firmware ("ROMs") built from the Android source code. Projects such as CyanogenMod continued to produce ports of newer versions of Android up to 4.1.1 "Jelly Bean" (as CyanogenMod 10) for the Dream and later Android devices, while adding their own features and enhancements to the operating system as well.

On later Android devices, where a number of factors (including carrier practices, and custom software provided by device manufacturers that sit atop Android, such as HTC Sense and Samsung TouchWiz) led to fragmentation regarding the availability of newer versions of the OS for certain devices, the development and use of custom ROMs (which are usually based on the "stock" version of Android) have ultimately become an important, yet controversial aspect of the Android ecosystem. In August 2012, a group of users released an unofficial port of a later version of Android, 4.1 "Jelly Bean", for the Dream as a proof of concept. However, the port lacked key functionality and had severe performance issues due to the phone's relatively weak hardware in comparison to the modern devices that 4.1 was designed for.

== Reception ==
=== Critical reception ===
The Dream was released to mixed reviews. The design of the Dream was considered to be solid and robust; Joshua Topolsky of Engadget considered its hardware design a contrast to that of the iPhone, due to its numerous navigation buttons (in comparison to just a home button) and its "charming, retro-future look; like a gadget in a 1970's sci-fi movie set in the year 2038." The Dream's keyboard, as the only method of text input before Android 1.5 introduced a virtual keyboard, was considered to be sufficient, although some felt that its keys were too small. Its display was considered sufficient for a phone of its class, but John Brandon of TechRadar felt that it was not good enough for watching videos due to its poor contrast and small size in comparison to the iPhone. Android itself was considered to still be in its infancy (primarily due to its bare-bones functionality in certain areas, limited application catalog, lack of multitouch gestures, or syncing with certain enterprise platforms), but showed promise through its customizable interface, increased flexibility over iOS, its notification system, ability to display security permissions when downloading apps, and its heavy integration with Google services.

Brandon gave the Dream a 4.5/5, despite stating that it was "no Apple iPhone killer", given the lower quality of its application selection and multimedia features in comparison. In conclusion, the Dream was considered to be a "stellar" phone that "points to a future when a phone is as flexible and useful as the PC on your desk." Engadget felt that the Dream "isn't going to blow anyone's mind right out of the gate" due to its hardware, but that the Android platform as a whole held its own against its competitors, and that early adopters of Android through the G1 were "buying into one of the most exciting developments in the mobile world in recent memory." GSMArena noted that the Dream would have been "another average smart QWERTY messenger" had it not been for its introduction of Android; in conclusion, the Dream was considered "far from the perfect package", but still believed "it gets the things that matter done and gets them done right."

=== Commercial reception ===
In April 2009, T-Mobile announced that it had sold over a million G1s in the United States, accounting for two-thirds of the devices on its 3G network. AdMob estimated in March 2009 that Android and the G1 had reached a market share of 6% in the United States.

== See also ==
- HTC Hero, HTC's first Android device with its Sense software
- Nexus One, an Android device developed for Google by HTC to launch the Nexus series of flagship devices
- HTC Touch Diamond, HTC's Windows Mobile flagship at the time
