= Android Eclair =

2009 Android mobile operating system

- Version of the Android operating system

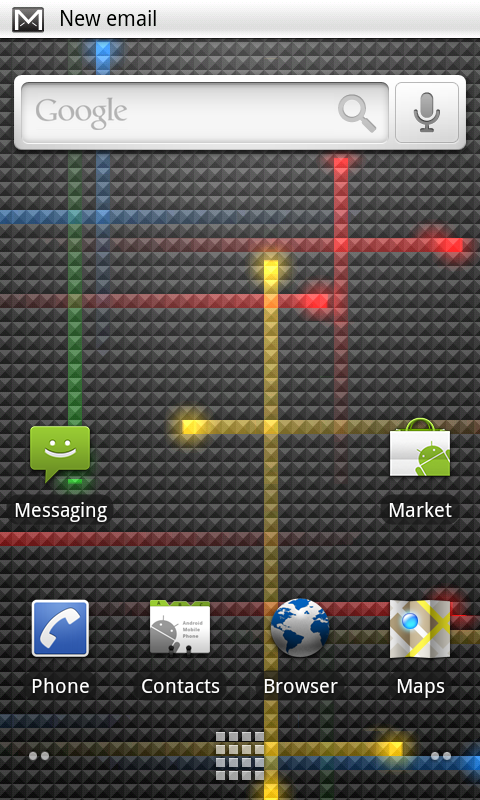
- Android 2.1 running on a Nexus One
- Developer: Google
- Initial release: October 27, 2009; 16 years ago
- Final release: 2.1_r2.1p2 (EPF21B) / January 11, 2010; 16 years ago
- Kernel type: Monolithic (Linux)
- Preceded by: Android Donut (1.6)
- Succeeded by: Android Froyo (2.2)
- Official website: developer.android.com/about/versions/android-2.0-highlights

Support status
- Unsupported; Android Market support dropped since June 30, 2017; Google Account support dropped on September 27, 2021

Android Eclair is the codename of the fifth version (and second major release) of the Android mobile operating system. Eclair spans the versions 2.0.x and 2.1. Unveiled on October 26, 2009, Android Eclair builds upon the significant changes made in Android 1.6 "Donut". The first phone with Android Eclair was the Motorola Droid. Google ceased support for the Android Market on Android 2.1 and older on June 30, 2017.

== Features ==
=== User experience ===
The default home screen of Eclair displays a persistent Google Search bar across the top of the screen. The camera app was also redesigned with numerous new camera features, including flash support, digital zoom, scene mode, white balance, color effect, and macro focus. The photo gallery app also contains basic photo editing tools. This version also added live wallpapers, allowing the home-screen background images to animate. Speech-to-text was first introduced, replacing the comma key.

=== Platform ===
Android Eclair inherits platform additions from the Donut release, including the ability to search all saved SMS and MMS messages, improved Google Maps 3.1.2, and Exchange support for the Email app. The operating system also provides improved typing speed on a virtual keyboard, along with new accessibility, calendar, and virtual private network APIs. For internet browsing, Android Eclair also adds support for HTML5, refreshed browser UI with bookmark thumbnails, and double-tap zoom.

== See also ==
- Android version history
- Windows Mobile 6.5
- Windows 7
