= Android Gingerbread =

2010 Android mobile operating system

- Version of the Android operating system
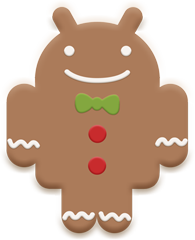

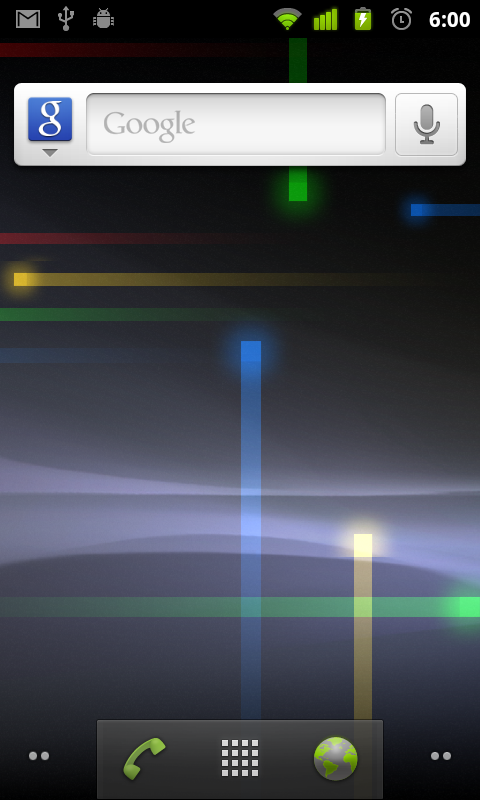
- Android 2.3.7 on an Android SDK emulator
- Developer: Google
- Working state: No longer supported
- Initial release: December 6, 2010; 15 years ago
- Final release: 2.3.7_r1 (GWK74) / September 21, 2011; 15 years ago
- Kernel type: Monolithic (Linux)
- Preceded by: Android Froyo (2.2)
- Succeeded by: Android Honeycomb (3.0) (tablets); Android Ice Cream Sandwich (4.0) (smartphones)
- Official website: developer.android.com/about/versions/android-2.3-highlights

Support status
- Unsupported since November 14, 2016; Google Play Services support dropped since January 2017; Google Account support dropped on September 27, 2021

Android 2.3 Gingerbread is the seventh version of the Android mobile operating system developed by Google and released on December 6, 2010.

== Version ==
Android Gingerbread introduced support for near field communication (NFC)—used in mobile payment solutions—and Session Initiation Protocol (SIP)—used in VoIP internet telephones. The first phone with Android Gingerbread was the Nexus S.

Android Gingerbread's user interface was refined, making it easier to master, faster to use, and more power-efficient. A simplified color scheme with a black background gave vividness and contrast to the notification bar, menus, and other user interface components. Improvements to menus and settings made navigation and system control easier.

The Nexus S smartphone, released in December 2010, was the first phone from the Google Nexus line that ran Gingerbread, and also the first one from the line with built-in NFC functionality.

As of October 2022, statistics issued by Google indicate that 0.11% of all Android devices accessing Google Play were running on Gingerbread. Google ceased sign-in support for Android 2.3.7 and older on September 27, 2021, requiring to upgrade the Google Account Manager version to at least version 4.1.2.

== Features ==
New features introduced by Gingerbread include the following:

- Updated user interface design, providing increased ease of use and efficiency.
- Support for extra-large screen sizes and resolutions (WXGA and higher).
- Native support for SIP VoIP internet telephones.
- Improved text input using the virtual keyboard, with improved accuracy, better text suggestions, and voice input capability.
- Enhanced copy/paste functionality, allowing users to select a word by pressing and holding, copying, and pasting.
- Support for Near Field Communication (NFC), allowing the user to read NFC tags embedded in posters, stickers, or advertisements.
- New audio effects such as reverb, equalization, headphone virtualization, and bass boost.
- New Download Manager, giving users easy access to any file downloaded from the browser, email, or another application.
- Support for multiple cameras on the device, including a front-facing camera, if available.
- Support for WebM/VP8 video playback, and AAC audio encoding.
- Improved power management, including more active management of power-consuming applications.
- Enhanced support for native code development.
- A switch from YAFFS to ext4 file system on newer devices.
- Audio, graphical, and input enhancements for game developers.
- Concurrent garbage collection for increased performance.
- Native support for more sensors (such as gyroscopes and barometers).
- The first Android easter egg, which depicts the Android mascot standing beside a zombified gingerbread man in a field of other zombies talking on cell phones, presumably Android smartphones.
- Improved speed over Froyo due to system updates.

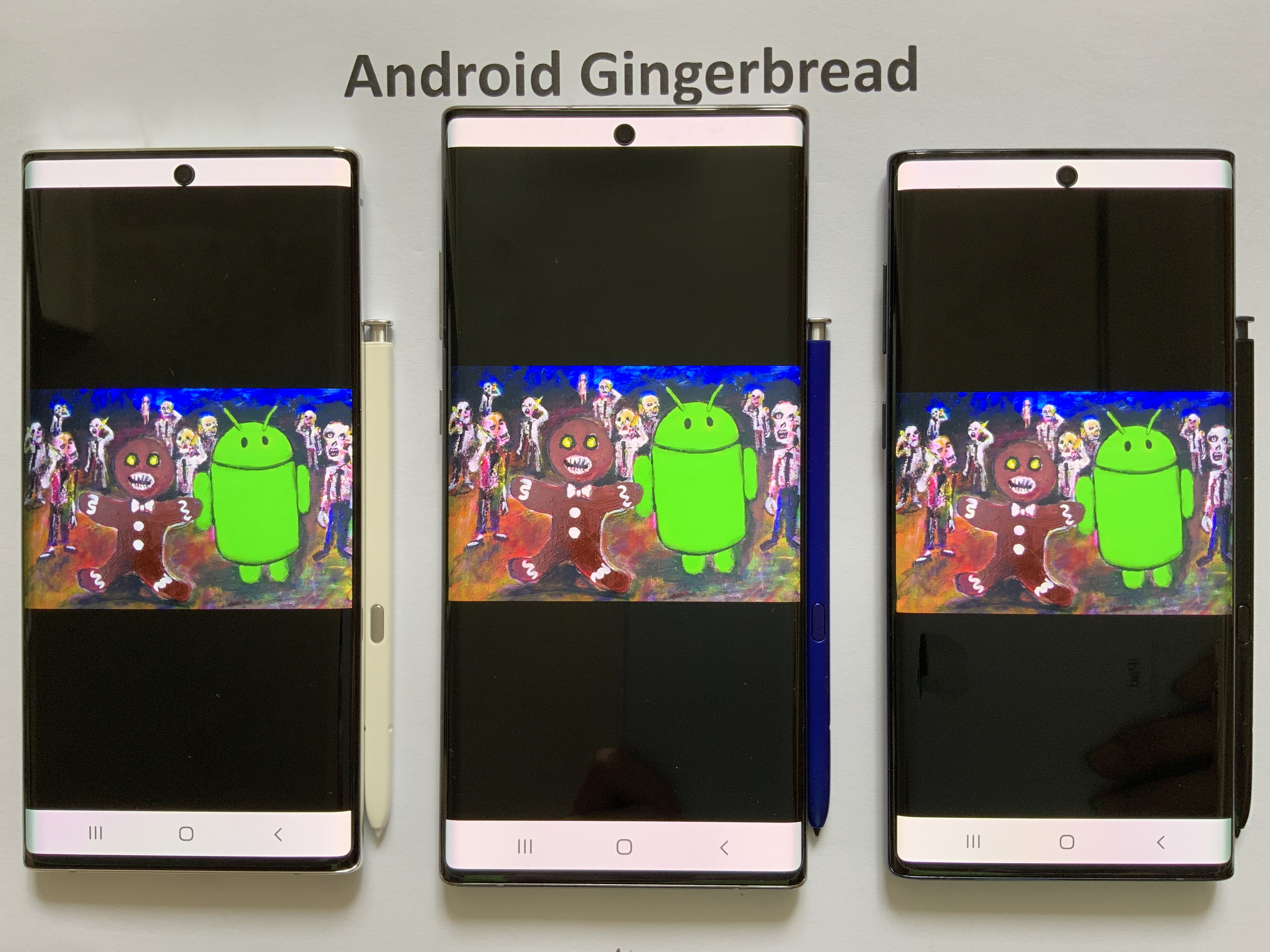
Three modern phones showing Android Gingerbread's Easter Egg image

== See also ==
- Android version history
- iOS 4
- Mac OS X Snow Leopard
- Windows Phone 7
- Windows 7
