= Android Froyo =

2010 Android mobile operating system

- Version of the Android operating system

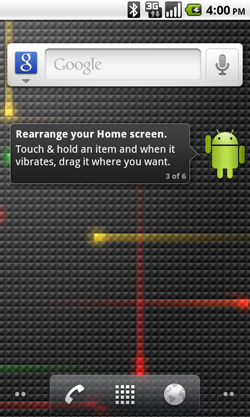
- Android 2.2.3 home screen
- Developer: Google
- OS family: Android
- Released to manufacturing: May 20, 2010; 16 years ago
- General availability: June 23, 2010; 16 years ago
- Final release: 2.2.3_r2.1 / November 21, 2011; 14 years ago
- Kernel type: Monolithic (Linux)
- Preceded by: Android Eclair (2.0)
- Succeeded by: Android Gingerbread (2.3)
- Official website: developer.android.com/about/versions/android-2.2-highlights

Support status
- Unsupported; Google Play Services support has dropped since October 2014; Google Account support dropped on September 27, 2021

Android Froyo is the sixth version of Android and is a codename of the Android mobile operating system developed by Google, spanning versions between 2.2 and 2.2.3. Those versions are no longer supported. The name Froyo is short for frozen yogurt.

== Details ==
It was unveiled on May 20, 2010, during the Google I/O 2010 conference. Google ceased sign-in support for Google accounts on Android Froyo to Android Gingerbread on September 27, 2021.

One of the most prominent changes in the Froyo release was USB tethering and Wi-Fi hotspot functionality. Other changes include support for the Android Cloud to Device Messaging (C2DM) service, enabling push notifications, additional application speed improvements, implemented through JIT compilation and displayed within applications as top-of-the-screen banners.

== Features ==
=== 2.2.0 ===
New features introduced by Froyo include the following:

- Speed, memory, and performance optimizations.
- Additional application speed improvements, implemented through JIT compilation.
- Integration of Chrome's V8 JavaScript engine into the Browser application.
- Support for the Android Cloud to Device Messaging (C2DM) service, enabling push notifications.
- Improved Microsoft Exchange support, including security policies, auto-discovery, GAL look-up, calendar synchronization, and remote wipe.
- Improved application launcher with shortcuts to Phone and Browser applications.
- USB tethering and Wi-Fi hotspot functionality.
- Option to restrict data access over a mobile network.
- Updated Market application with batch and automatic update features.
- Quick switching between multiple keyboard languages and their dictionaries.
- Support for Bluetooth-enabled car and desk docks.
- Support for numeric and alphanumeric passwords.
- Support for file upload fields in the Browser application.
- The browser now shows all frames of animated GIFs instead of just the first frame.
- Support for installing applications to the expandable memory.
- Adobe Flash support.
- Support for high-PPI displays (up to 320 ppi), such as four-inch 720p screens.
- Introduced .asec file extension.
- Gallery allows users to view picture stacks using a zoom gesture.

=== 2.2.1 ===
- Bug fixes, security updates, and performance improvements.

=== 2.2.2 ===
- Minor bug fixes, including SMS routing issues that affected the Nexus One.

=== 2.2.3 ===
- Two security updates.

== See also ==
- Android version history
- iOS 4
- Mac OS X Snow Leopard
- Windows Mobile 6.5
- Windows 7
