= List of Windows Mobile devices =

Windows Mobile is a mobile operating system platform developed by Microsoft, based on Windows CE and is the successor to the Pocket PC 2002 and Smartphone 2002 platforms, and the predecessor of Windows Phone. New devices running Windows Mobile were released between 2003 and 2010. Many different companies produced devices running Windows Mobile during this time frame. The table below groups devices into two categories, those with cellular capability and those without. The version of Windows Mobile 5.x called "Smartphone", and the version of Windows Mobile 6.x called "Standard", is designed to run on devices without a touch screen; all other devices listed have touch screens.

== Windows Mobile 2003 ==
Device(s)/Device Family	Edition	Cellular
Acer N10, N30, and N35	Windows Mobile 2003 for Pocket PC	No
Asus MyPal A600, A620, A620 BT, A716, and A730	Windows Mobile 2003 for Pocket PC	No
Dell Axim X3 and X3i	Windows Mobile 2003 for Pocket PC	No
Fujitsu Siemens Pocket LOOX 410, 420, and 610	Windows Mobile 2003 for Pocket PC	No
HP iPAQ h2210, h4150, h4350, and h5550	Windows Mobile 2003 for Pocket PC	No
Mitac Mio 168, 336, 339, and 558	Windows Mobile 2003 for Pocket PC	No
Toshiba e350, e400, e750, and e800	Windows Mobile 2003 for Pocket PC	No
Viewsonic V37	Windows Mobile 2003 for Pocket PC	No
AnexTEK SP230	Windows Mobile 2003 for Pocket PC Phone Edition	Yes
Audiovox PPC-4100 and PPC-5050	Windows Mobile 2003 for Pocket PC Phone Edition	Yes
E-TEN P300B	Windows Mobile 2003 for Pocket PC Phone Edition	Yes
HP iPAQ h6315	Windows Mobile 2003 for Pocket PC Phone Edition	Yes
Krome Navigator F1	Windows Mobile 2003 for Pocket PC Phone Edition	Yes
Motorola MPx	Windows Mobile 2003 for Pocket PC Phone Edition	Yes
O2 Xda II	Windows Mobile 2003 for Pocket PC Phone Edition	Yes
QTEK 2020	Windows Mobile 2003 for Pocket PC Phone Edition	Yes
T-Mobile MDA II	Windows Mobile 2003 for Pocket PC Phone Edition	Yes
Telefónica of Spain TSM50000000	Windows Mobile 2003 for Pocket PC Phone Edition	Yes
i-mate Phone Edition	Windows Mobile 2003 for Pocket PC Phone Edition	Yes
Dopod 515	Windows Mobile 2003 for Smartphone	Yes
Krome Intellekt iQ200	Windows Mobile 2003 for Smartphone	Yes
Mitac Mio 8390 and 8860	Windows Mobile 2003 for Smartphone	Yes
Motorola MPx220	Windows Mobile 2003 for Smartphone	Yes
O2 Xphone	Windows Mobile 2003 for Smartphone	Yes
Orange SPV E200 and e100	Windows Mobile 2003 for Smartphone	Yes
QTEK 7070 and 8080	Windows Mobile 2003 for Smartphone	Yes
Sagem myS-7	Windows Mobile 2003 for Smartphone	Yes
Sierra Wireless Voq	Windows Mobile 2003 for Smartphone	Yes
Smart Amazing Phone and Amazing Phone II	Windows Mobile 2003 for Smartphone	Yes
i-mate Smartphone and Smartphone2	Windows Mobile 2003 for Smartphone	Yes

== Windows Mobile 2003 Second Edition (SE) ==
Device(s)/Device Family	Edition	Cellular
Acer N50	Windows Mobile 2003 for Pocket PC SE	No
Dell Axim X30, X30i, X50, X50v	Windows Mobile 2003 for Pocket PC SE	No
Fujitsu Siemens Pocket LOOX 710, 718, 720	Windows Mobile 2003 for Pocket PC SE	No
Garmin iQue M3, M4, M5	Windows Mobile 2003 for Pocket PC SE	No
HP iPAQ hx2110, hx2410, hx2750, hx3715, hx4700, rz1710, rx3115, rx3415, rx3715	Windows Mobile 2003 for Pocket PC SE	No
Pharos Traveler GPS 505	Windows Mobile 2003 for Pocket PC SE	No
Toshiba e830	Windows Mobile 2003 for Pocket PC SE	No
Medion MD 95000	Windows Mobile 2003 SE	No
Audiovox PPC-6601, XV6600	Windows Mobile 2003 SE for Pocket PC Phone Edition	Yes
BenQ P50	Windows Mobile 2003 SE for Pocket PC Phone Edition	Yes
Daxian CU928	Windows Mobile 2003 SE for Pocket PC Phone Edition	Yes
Dopod 700, 818, 828	Windows Mobile 2003 SE for Pocket PC Phone Edition	Yes
E-TEN M500	Windows Mobile 2003 SE for Pocket PC Phone Edition	Yes
HP iPAQ hw6500 series Mobile Messenger	Windows Mobile 2003 SE for Pocket PC Phone Edition	Yes
Krome Spy	Windows Mobile 2003 SE for Pocket PC Phone Edition	Yes
Lenovo ET960	Windows Mobile 2003 SE for Pocket PC Phone Edition	Yes
O2 Xda III, IIi, IIs, mini	Windows Mobile 2003 SE for Pocket PC Phone Edition	Yes
Orange SPV M2000, M2500, M500	Windows Mobile 2003 SE for Pocket PC Phone Edition	Yes
QTEK 9090, S100, S110	Windows Mobile 2003 SE for Pocket PC Phone Edition	Yes
Samsung SCH-i730, SCH-M420, SCH-M430 and SPH-M4300	Windows Mobile 2003 SE for Pocket PC Phone Edition	Yes
Siemens SX66	Windows Mobile 2003 SE for Pocket PC Phone Edition	Yes
Sprint PPC-6601	Windows Mobile 2003 SE for Pocket PC Phone Edition	Yes
T-Mobile MDA Compact, Compact II	Windows Mobile 2003 SE for Pocket PC Phone Edition	Yes
Tata Indicom EGO	Windows Mobile 2003 SE for Pocket PC Phone Edition	Yes
Telecom New Zealand Harrier	Windows Mobile 2003 SE for Pocket PC Phone Edition	Yes
Torq P100	Windows Mobile 2003 SE for Pocket PC Phone Edition	Yes
Verizon XV6600	Windows Mobile 2003 SE for Pocket PC Phone Edition	Yes
Vodafone VPA Compact, VPA III	Windows Mobile 2003 SE for Pocket PC Phone Edition	Yes
e-plus PDA III	Windows Mobile 2003 SE for Pocket PC Phone Edition	Yes
i-mate JAM, New JAM	Windows Mobile 2003 SE for Pocket PC Phone Edition	Yes
Orange C500 (HTC Typhoon)	Windows Mobile 2003 SE	Yes
HTC Magician	Windows Mobile 2003 SE	Yes

== Windows Mobile 5.0 ==
Device(s)/Device Family	Edition	Cellular
Toshiba e800	Windows Mobile 5.0 Pocket PC	No
Airis e800	Windows Mobile 5.0 Pocket PC	No
Asus MyPal A632, A636, A639, A686 and A696	Windows Mobile 5.0 Pocket PC	No
Cyberbank POZ-G300	Windows Mobile 5.0 Pocket PC	No
Dell Axim X51 and X51v	Windows Mobile 5.0 Pocket PC	No
Dopod P100	Windows Mobile 5.0 Pocket PC	No
Fujitsu Siemens Pocket LOOX C550, N500, N520 and N560	Windows Mobile 5.0 Pocket PC	No
HP iPAQ hx2190, hx2790, and rx1950	Windows Mobile 5.0 Pocket PC	No
Mitac Mio A201, P350, and P550	Windows Mobile 5.0 Pocket PC	No
Motorola TETRA PDA	Windows Mobile 5.0 Pocket PC	No
QTEK G100	Windows Mobile 5.0 Pocket PC	No
i-mate PDA-N	Windows Mobile 5.0 Pocket PC	No
Alltel UTStarcom PPC6700	Windows Mobile 5.0 Pocket PC Phone Edition	Yes
AnexTEK SP310, and moboDA 3160/3360/3380	Windows Mobile 5.0 Pocket PC Phone Edition	Yes
Audiovox PPC-6700	Windows Mobile 5.0 Pocket PC Phone Edition	Yes
Axia A308	Windows Mobile 5.0 Pocket PC Phone Edition	Yes
BenQ-Siemens P51	Windows Mobile 5.0 Pocket PC Phone Edition	Yes
CHT 9000	Windows Mobile 5.0 Pocket PC Phone Edition	Yes
Cingular 8125, 8500, and 8525	Windows Mobile 5.0 Pocket PC Phone Edition	Yes
Claro 9100	Windows Mobile 5.0 Pocket PC Phone Edition	Yes
Dallab DX8	Windows Mobile 5.0 Pocket PC Phone Edition	Yes
Dopod 818 Pro, 838, 838Pro, 900, C800, D810, M700, U1000, and P800W	Windows Mobile 5.0 Pocket PC Phone Edition	Yes
ETEN G500, G500+, M600, M600+, and glofiish M700/X500	Windows Mobile 5.0 Pocket PC Phone Edition	Yes
Fujitsu Siemens Pocket LOOX T810, and T830	Windows Mobile 5.0 Pocket PC Phone Edition	Yes
Gigabyte GSmart, GSmart i/i120/i128/i200/i300	Windows Mobile 5.0 Pocket PC Phone Edition	Yes
Grundig GR980	Windows Mobile 5.0 Pocket PC Phone Edition	Yes
HP iPAQ hw6910, hw6915, hw6920, hw6925, hw6940, hw6945, hw6965, rw6818, and rw6828	Windows Mobile 5.0 Pocket PC Phone Edition	Yes
HTC P3300, P3600, P6300, P4350, TyTN, and X7500	Windows Mobile 5.0 Pocket PC Phone Edition	Yes
Kinpo Neon, Saturn, and Tin	Windows Mobile 5.0 Pocket PC Phone Edition	Yes
Laser mLaser	Windows Mobile 5.0 Pocket PC Phone Edition	Yes
Lenovo ET980 and i921	Windows Mobile 5.0 Pocket PC Phone Edition	Yes
Mitac A701	Windows Mobile 5.0 Pocket PC Phone Edition	Yes
NTT DoCoMo hTc Z	Windows Mobile 5.0 Pocket PC Phone Edition	Yes
O2 XDA Neo, Atom, Atom Exec/Life/Pure, and Xda Exec/Flame/Orbit/Trion/Zinc/mini Pro/mini s	Windows Mobile 5.0 Pocket PC Phone Edition	Yes
ORSiO n725	Windows Mobile 5.0 Pocket PC Phone Edition	Yes
Orange SPV M3000, M3100, M5000, M600, and M700	Windows Mobile 5.0 Pocket PC Phone Edition	Yes
Palm Treo 700w, 700wx, and 750v	Windows Mobile 5.0 Pocket PC Phone Edition	Yes
Pharos GPS Phone	Windows Mobile 5.0 Pocket PC Phone Edition	Yes
QTEK 9000, 9100, S200, S300, and 9600	Windows Mobile 5.0 Pocket PC Phone Edition	Yes
Qool QDA Icon and QDA Lite	Windows Mobile 5.0 Pocket PC Phone Edition	Yes
Reliance Mobile Pocket PC	Windows Mobile 5.0 Pocket PC Phone Edition	Yes
RoverPC G5	Windows Mobile 5.0 Pocket PC Phone Edition	Yes
SFR v1605 and V1640	Windows Mobile 5.0 Pocket PC Phone Edition	Yes
Samsung IP830-w, SCH-i760, SCH-i770, SGH-i600, SCH-M450 and SPH-M4500	Windows Mobile 5.0 Pocket PC Phone Edition	Yes
Sharp EM One (Japan only)	Windows Mobile 5.0 Pocket PC (no voice calling)	Yes
SoftBank X01HT	Windows Mobile 5.0 Pocket PC Phone Edition	Yes
Sprint PPC-6700	Windows Mobile 5.0 Pocket PC Phone Edition	Yes
T-Mobile MDA AMEO/Compact II/Compact III/Pro/Vario/Vario II	Windows Mobile 5.0 Pocket PC Phone Edition	Yes
Telecom New Zealand Apache	Windows Mobile 5.0 Pocket PC Phone Edition	Yes
Telus UTStarcom PPC6700	Windows Mobile 5.0 Pocket PC Phone Edition	Yes
Torq N100 and P120	Windows Mobile 5.0 Pocket PC Phone Edition	Yes
UBiQUiO 501 and 601	Windows Mobile 5.0 Pocket PC Phone Edition	Yes
UTStarcom PPC-5800 and PPC-6700	Windows Mobile 5.0 Pocket PC Phone Edition	Yes
Verizon XV-6700	Windows Mobile 5.0 Pocket PC Phone Edition	Yes
Vodafone Treo 750v, VPA Compact II/III/IV/s/GPS, VPA IV, and v1640	Windows Mobile 5.0 Pocket PC Phone Edition	Yes
Willcom W-Zero3	Windows Mobile 5.0 Pocket PC Phone Edition	Yes
i-mate JAQ, JAQ3, JASJAM, JASJAR, Jamin, K-JAM, KJAR, and PDAL	Windows Mobile 5.0 Pocket PC Phone Edition	Yes
izen Mobile Krma.	Windows Mobile 5.0 Pocket PC Phone Edition	Yes
Asus P305 and P525	Windows Mobile 5.0 Smartphone	Yes
Cingular 2125, 3125, and BlackJack	Windows Mobile 5.0 Smartphone	Yes
Dopod 557w, 586w, 595, C720W, and S300	Windows Mobile 5.0 Smartphone	Yes
HTC MTeoR, S310, S620 and S650	Windows Mobile 5.0 Smartphone	Yes
Modeo	Windows Mobile 5.0 Smartphone	Yes
Motorola Q and Q Plus	Windows Mobile 5.0 Smartphone	Yes
O2 XDA IQ/Orion/Cosmo/Graphite/Phone/Stealth/Xphone	Windows Mobile 5.0 Smartphone	Yes
Orange SPV C100/C600/C700/F600	Windows Mobile 5.0 Smartphone	Yes
Pantech PN820	Windows Mobile 5.0 Smartphone	Yes
Paragon Wireless hipi-2200	Windows Mobile 5.0 Smartphone	Yes
QTEK 8300, 8310, 8500, and 8600	Windows Mobile 5.0 Smartphone	Yes
Samsung SGH-i310, i320, i320N, i610 and Blackjack Series(SGH-i607, SCH-M620 and SPH-M6200)	Windows Mobile 5.0 Smartphone	Yes
T-Mobile MDA Dash/Mail, SDA, and SDA II	Windows Mobile 5.0 Smartphone	Yes
Tatung M1 and M1A	Windows Mobile 5.0 Smartphone	Yes
Verizon PN820	Windows Mobile 5.0 Smartphone	Yes
Virgin Mobile Lobster 700 TV	Windows Mobile 5.0 Smartphone	Yes
Vodafone VDA II/IV, v1210, and v1240	Windows Mobile 5.0 Smartphone	Yes
i-mate SP Jas, SP5, SP5m, SP6, SPL, and Smartflip.	Windows Mobile 5.0 Smartphone	Yes
Startronics Superphone	Windows Mobile 5.0 Smartphone	Yes

== Windows Mobile 6.0 ==
Device(s)/Device Family	Edition	Cellular
HP iPAQ 210 / 211	Windows Mobile 6.0 Classic	No
MIO (Digiwalker) P560	Windows Mobile 6.0 Classic	No
HP iPAQ 214 HANDHELD ENTREPRISE	Windows Mobile 6.0 Classic	No
HTC Touch	Windows Mobile 6.0 Professional	Yes
HTC TyTN II	Windows Mobile 6.0 Professional	Yes
HTC P3470 Pharos	Windows Mobile 6.0 Professional	Yes
HTC S710 (also known as HTC Vox, Orange SPV E650, Vodafone v1415, Dopod C500)	Windows Mobile 6.0 Standard	Yes
BenQ E72	Windows Mobile 6.0 Standard	Yes
Pantech Duo C810	Windows Mobile 6.0 Standard	Yes
Toshiba G900 (also known as Toshiba Portégé G900, Softbank X01T)	Windows Mobile 6.0 Professional	Yes

== Windows Mobile 6.1 ==
Device(s)/Device Family	Edition	Cellular
Acer F900	Windows Mobile 6.1 Professional	Yes
HP iPAQ 610c	Windows Mobile 6.1 Professional	Yes
HP iPAQ 910c	Windows Mobile 6.1 Professional	Yes
HTC SNAP	Windows Mobile 6.1 Standard	Yes
HTC Touch Pro	Windows Mobile 6.1 Professional	Yes
HTC Touch Pro2 (earlier models)	Windows Mobile 6.1 Professional	Yes
HTC Touch Viva	Windows Mobile 6.1 Professional	Yes
HTC Touch 3G	Windows Mobile 6.1 Professional	Yes
HTC Touch HD	Windows Mobile 6.1 Professional	Yes
HTC Max 4G	Windows Mobile 6.1 Professional	Yes
HTC Touch Cruise	Windows Mobile 6.1 Professional	Yes
HTC TyTN II	Windows Mobile 6.1 Professional	Yes
Palm Treo Pro	Windows Mobile 6.1 Professional	Yes
Samsung C6625 Valencia	Windows Mobile 6.1 Standard	Yes
Samsung Omnia (Samsung i900)	Windows Mobile 6.1 Professional	Yes
Socket Mobile SoMo 650	Windows Mobile 6.1 Classic	No
Sony Ericsson Xperia X1	Windows Mobile 6.1 Professional	Yes
LG Incite	Windows Mobile 6.1 Professional	Yes

== Windows Mobile 6.5 ==
Device(s)/Device Family	Edition	Cellular
Samsung Omnia Pro B6520	Windows Mobile 6.5 Standard	Yes
Samsung Omnia Pro B7330	Windows Mobile 6.5 Standard	Yes
Samsung Jack	Windows Mobile 6.5 Standard	Yes
Garmin-Asus M10	Windows Mobile 6.5 Professional	Yes
Garmin-Asus M10e	Windows Mobile 6.5 Professional	Yes
LG Fathom VS750	Windows Mobile 6.5 Professional	Yes
Samsung Omnia II	Windows Mobile 6.5 Professional	Yes
Gigabyte GSmart S1205	Windows Mobile 6.5 Professional	Yes
Cherry Mobile Eclipse	Windows Mobile 6.5 Professional	Yes
Cherry Mobile Eclipse II	Windows Mobile 6.5 Professional	Yes
Samsung Epix	Windows Mobile 6.5 Professional	Yes
Samsung Intrepid SPH-i350	Windows Mobile 6.5 Professional	Yes
Samsung Ace SPH-i325	Windows Mobile 6.5 Professional	Yes
Samsung Omnia 735 / Samsung B7350 Omnia PRO 4	Windows Mobile 6.5 Professional	Yes
HTC Pure	Windows Mobile 6.5 Professional	Yes
HTC Tilt2	Windows Mobile 6.5 Professional	Yes
LG eXpo	Windows Mobile 6.5 Professional	Yes
HP Glisten	Windows Mobile 6.5 Professional	Yes
HTC HD2 (Leo)	Windows Mobile 6.5 Professional	Yes
HTC Touch2	Windows Mobile 6.5 Professional	Yes
HTC Touch Pro2 (later or upgraded models)	Windows Mobile 6.5 Professional	Yes
HTC Imagio (Verizon) (later or upgraded models)	Windows Mobile 6.5 Professional	Yes
HTC HD Mini	Windows Mobile 6.5 Professional	Yes
Sony Ericsson Xperia X2	Windows Mobile 6.5 Professional	Yes
Sony Ericsson M1i Aspen	Windows Mobile 6.5 Professional	Yes
Socket Mobile SoMo655	Windows Mobile 6.5 Professional	No
Motorola ES400	Windows Mobile 6.5 Professional/Windows Embedded Handheld 6.5	Yes
Philips Xenium V816	Windows Mobile 6.5.3 Professional	Yes

== See also ==
- List of Windows Phone devices (Windows Mobile is not to be confused with Windows Phone)
