= HTC Touch HD =

Smartphone model

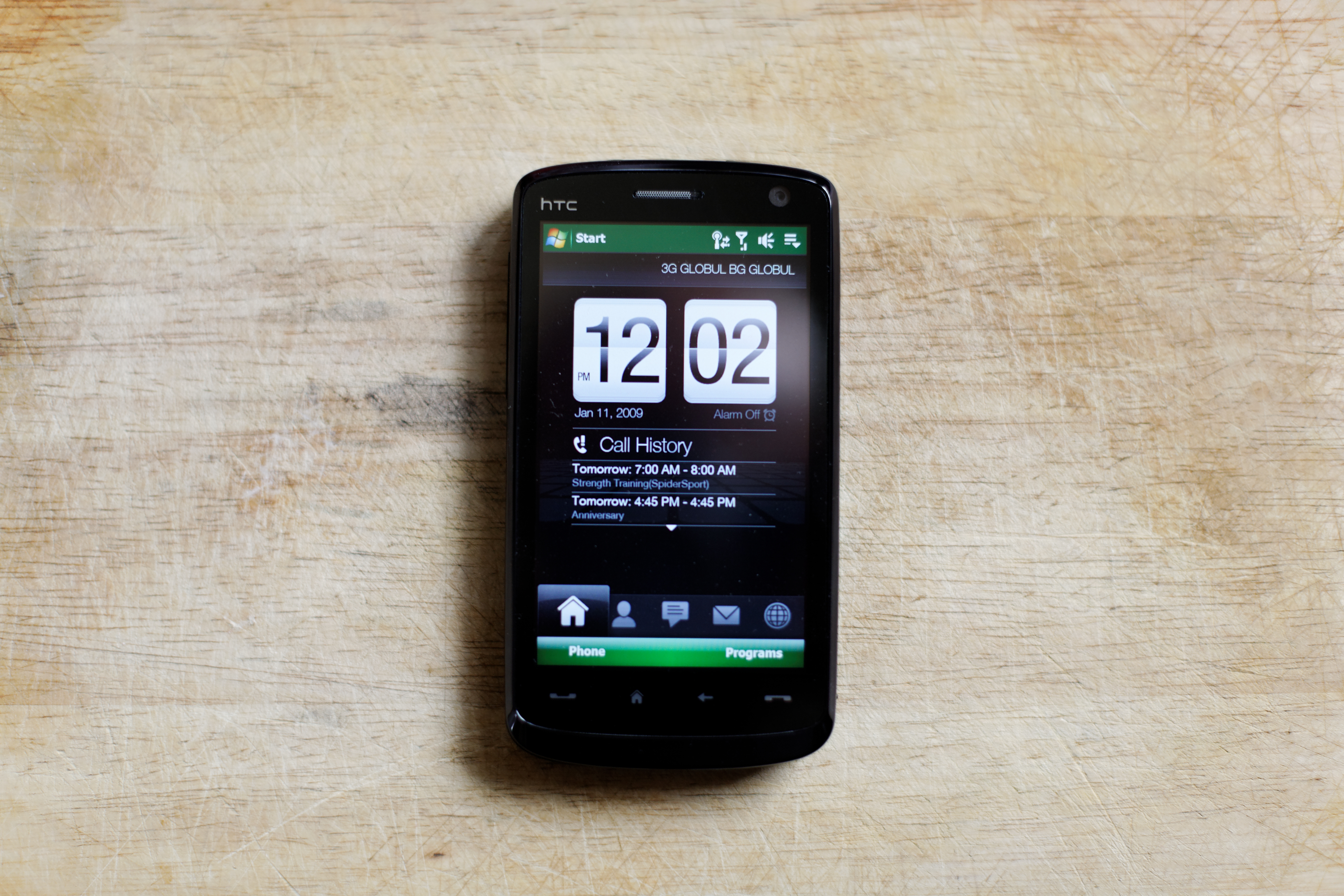
- An image of the HTC Touch HD
- Manufacturer: HTC Corporation
- Series: HTC Touch family
- Availability by region: 2008; 18 years ago
- Predecessor: HTC Touch, HTC Touch Diamond
- Successor: HTC HD2
- Compatible networks: Quad band GSM/GPRS/EDGE (GSM 850, GSM 900, GSM 1800, GSM 1900); Dual band UMTS/HSDPA/HSUPA (UMTS 900, UMTS 2100)
- Dimensions: 115 mm (4.5 in) (h); 62.8 mm (2.47 in) (w); 12 mm (0.47 in) (d)
- Weight: 146.4 g (5.16 oz)
- Operating system: Official: Windows Mobile 6.1 Professional; Unofficial: Windows Mobile 6.5 Professional, Android
- CPU: Qualcomm MSM7201A ARM processor at 528 MHz
- Memory: 288 MB RAM; 512 MB ROM
- Removable storage: microSD
- Battery: 1350 mAh Lithium-ion polymer battery, user accessible
- Rear camera: 5 MP AF back
- Front camera: 0.3 MP front
- Display: 800×480 px, 3.8 in (97 mm), TFT LCD
- Connectivity: Mini USB; Bluetooth 2.0 + EDR + A2DP; Wi-Fi (802.11b/g)
- Data inputs: Resistive Touchscreen, Resistive Touch-Sensitive Buttons (belonging to Touchscreen)

The HTC Touch HD, also known as the HTC T828X or its codename the HTC Blackstone, is a Windows Mobile 6.1 Pocket PC designed and manufactured by HTC launched in 2008.

Part of the HTC Touch Family, it features a larger, higher-resolution display than those found in most smart-phones available at the time, a 5-megapixel camera, a second front-facing camera to enable Videophone functionality, an accelerometer, GPS, FM RDS radio reception, high resolution video recording capability and SD Micro card compatibility (up to 64 GB). It also features quad band GSM and dual band UMTS connectivity, as well as the proprietary TouchFLO 3D user interface developed by HTC. However, it lacks the left side slide-out keyboard of the HTC Touch Pro.

Details of the device were leaked several days before an official press release and a new product page confirmed the specifications and the release date in Europe (Q4 2008). HTC announced that the Touch HD would be available in the UK from November 7, 2008. While the FCC has approved the HTC Touch HD for the US, HTC has confirmed that the device will not officially be available in the US. The Touch HD generally received mixed reviews from critics, praising its screen, colors, most of the hardware and applications, but its lighting of the screen was criticized.

== Specifications ==
The following specifications are those found on the HTC website.

- Screen size: 3.8 in (97 mm)
- Screen resolution: 480 × 800 (65k colour)
- Input devices: Resistive touchscreen, front panel buttons, Built in Active Stylus
- Battery: 1350 mAh
- Talk time: up to 480 minutes (GSM) up to 420 minutes (WCDMA)
- Standby time: up to 440 hours (GSM) up to 680 hours (WCDMA)
- Video call time: up to 140 minutes
- 5.1-megapixel rear-facing camera with autofocus, VGA CMOS color front-facing camera for video calls
- GPS and A-GPS
- Qualcomm MSM 7201A 528 MHz ARM processor
- RAM: 288 MB
- ROM: 512 MB
- With HTC sense and TouchFlo 3D
- Browser: Opera Mobile
- 3G: Up to 7.2 Mbit/s download speed, up to 2 Mbit/s upload speed
- microSD slot (SDHC compatible)
- Operating system: Windows Mobile 6.1 Professional
- Quad band GSM/GPRS/EDGE (GSM 850, GSM 900, GSM 1800, GSM 1900)
- Wi-Fi (802.11b/g)
- Bluetooth 2.0 + EDR & A2DP
- Mini USB (HTC ExtUSB)
- 3.5 mm audio jack, microphone, speaker
- FM radio
- G-Sensor
- Ambient light sensor
- Size: 115 mm (4.5 in) (h) 62.8 mm (2.47 in) (w) 12 mm (0.47 in) (d)
- Weight: 147 g (5.2 oz) with battery
