= O2 Xda =

Range of Windows Mobile PDA phones

The O_{2} Xda brand was a range of Windows Mobile PDA phones, marketed by O_{2}, developed by O_{2} Asia and manufactured by multiple original equipment manufacturers (mainly HTC, Quanta and Arima). The first model was released in June 2002. The last models came to market in 2008. The "X" represents convergence of voice and information/data within one product; the "da" stands for "digital assistant", as in personal digital assistant (PDA). The name of XDA Developers is derived from it.

== Retired models ==
=== Xda ===
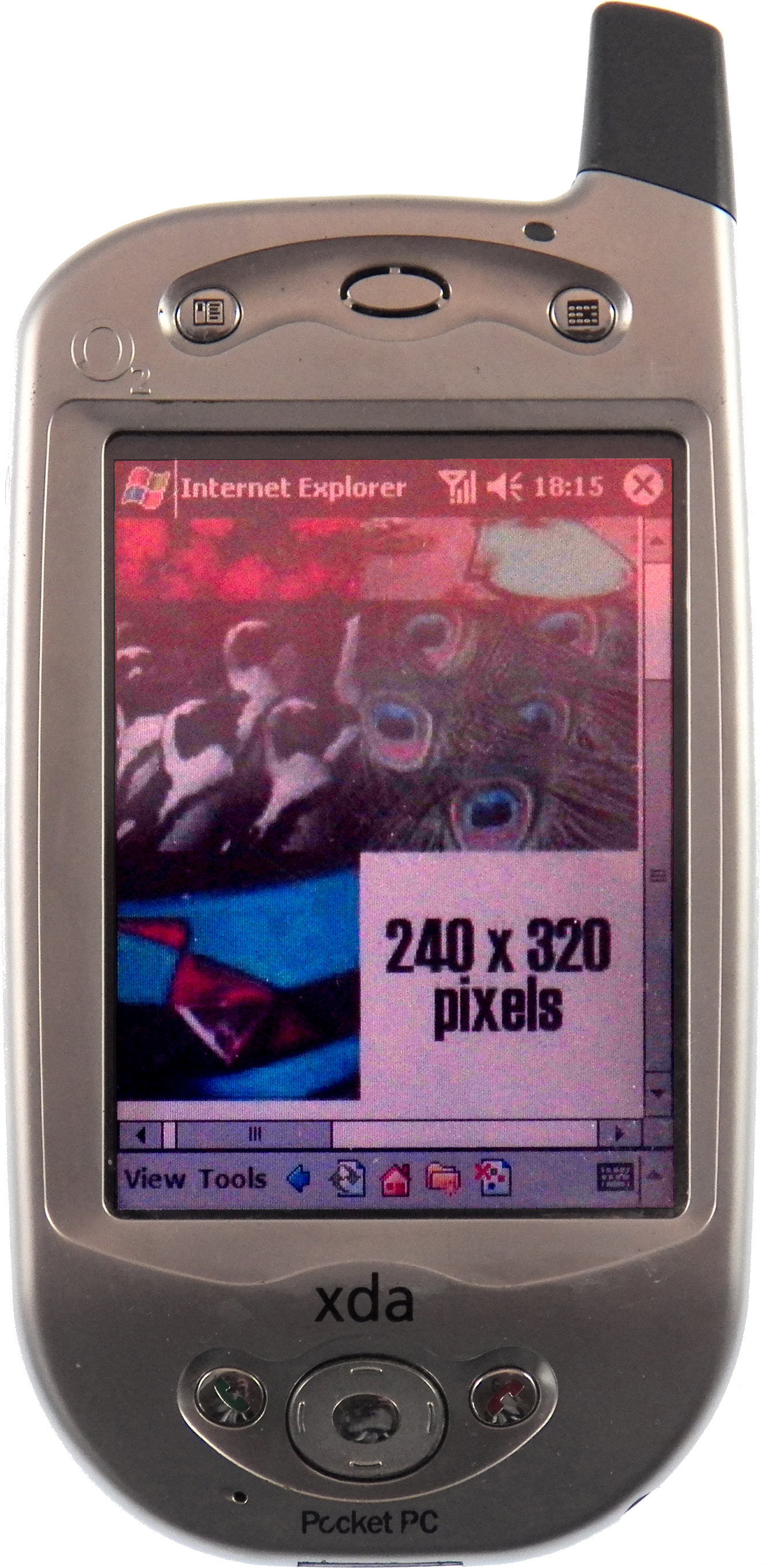
O2 XDA

The first product released in the XDA range.

- 206 MHz Intel SA-1110 microprocessor
- Initial models had 32 MB RAM, which was quickly increased to 64 MB
- 240×320 color touchscreen (12bit) 4096 colors
- I/O: cable (USB, RS-232), IrDA & SD flash card
- Dual-band 900/1800 MHz radio
- HTC codename: HTC Wallaby

=== Xda II ===
The successor to the Xda, the Xda II, was released in November 2003.

- Intel XScale PXA263 (400 MHz)
- 128 MB SDRAM, 64 MB ROM
- 3.5" Transflective 65,536 colour LCD (240×320 pixels)
- I/O: cable (USB, RS-232), IrDA, Bluetooth, SD flash card & SDIO flash card
- Integral VGA camera (640×480 pixels)
- HTC codename: HTC Andes, but variants were known as HTC Himalaya

=== Xda II Mini ===
- Intel Xscale PXA272 (416 MHz)
- 64 MB SDRAM, 64 MB ROM
- 2.8" Transflective 65,536 colour LCD (240×320 pixels)
- I/O: cable (USB), IrDA, Bluetooth, SD & Secure
- HTC codename: HTC Magician

=== Xda IIi ===
The Xda IIi was released in February 2005.

- Intel Xscale PXA272 (520 MHz)
- 128 MB SDRAM, 128 MB ROM
- 3.5" Transflective 65,536 colour LCD (240x320 pixels)
- 1.3 MP Camera
- HTC codename: HTC Alpine

=== Xda IIs ===
The Xda IIs was released in November 2004. O2 Germany released the device as Xda III.

- Intel Xscale PXA263 (400 MHz)
- 128 MB SDRAM, 96 MB ROM (44 MB available)
- QVGA 3.5" Transflective 65,536 colour LCD (240x320 pixels)
- I/O: cable (USB, RS-232), IrDA, Bluetooth, SD & SDIO flash card, and integrated Wireless LAN (802.11b)
- Integral 0.3 MP camera, VGA 640x480 pixels
- Quad band (GSM 850/900/1800/1900)
- Battery: 8500mh
- Weight: 205 g
- Size: 12.5 x 7.2 x 1.9 cm
- Slide out keyboard 39-key QWERTY keyboard
- Stand-by Up to 168 h
- Talk time Up to 4 h
- HTC codename: HTC Blueangel

=== Xda IQ ===
The Xda IQ was released in 2005 and runs Windows Mobile 5 Smartphone Edition.

- Texas Instruments OMAP 850 CPU (200 MHz)
- 128 MB SDRAM, 64 MB ROM
- 2.2" QVGA screen, 64K colour TFT LCD (240x320 pixels)
- I/O: cable (USB, RS-232), IrDA, Bluetooth, SD & SDIO flash card, and integrated Wireless LAN (802.11b)
- Integral 1.3 MP camera
- Quad band (GSM 850/900/1800/1900)
- Battery: 1150 mAh
- Weight: 110g
- Size: 4.6 x 10.9 x 1.8 cm
- HTC codename: HTC Tornado

=== Xda Exec ===
The Xda Exec was released in July 2005 and is the first Xda to run Windows Mobile 5, with highest speed processor at the time.

- Intel Bulverde 520 MHz
- 64 MB SDRAM, 128 MB ROM
- 3.6" Transflective 65,536 colour LCD (0.3M pixels, 640×480 pixel, 180° Pivot / Clamshell)
- I/O: cable (USB, RS-232), IrDA, Bluetooth, MMC & SDIO flash card, and integrated Wireless LAN (802.11b)
- Built-in 62 key QWERTY keyboard (Backlight Blue)
- Built-in 1.3 MP CMOS Camera with LED flash light - Can compose 2 MP 1600×1280 Image file, MPEG4 Video
- Dual integrated cameras, both for still picture and video
- 3 programmable buttons, 2 phone buttons, 5-way navigation button, Volume up/down button (2-way)
- Tri-band 900/1800/1900 MHz
- UMTS 2100 MHz
- Wireless data manager (UMTS/GSM/GPRS, Bluetooth, 802.11b)
- Support SMS, MMS.
- Voice Dialer
- Microsoft Messaging and Security Feature Pack (MSFP) allowing Direct Push Email, Wireless Calendar, Contacts, Tasks, Global Address List (GAL) Lookup and Security Policies after ROM update
- BlackBerry Connect software provided by official website
- Act as a wireless modem through USB, Bluetooth or IR
- Standby Time: up to 200 hours. Talk Time: up to 4 hours for the included removable and chargeable Lithium-Ion Polymer Battery, 1620 mAh
- Size: 79 (W) x 130 (L) x 21 (D) mm approx. Weight: 285g
- HTC codename: HTC Universal

ROM upgrade available at for UK/Irish users. Only released in Europe.

=== Xda Mini S ===
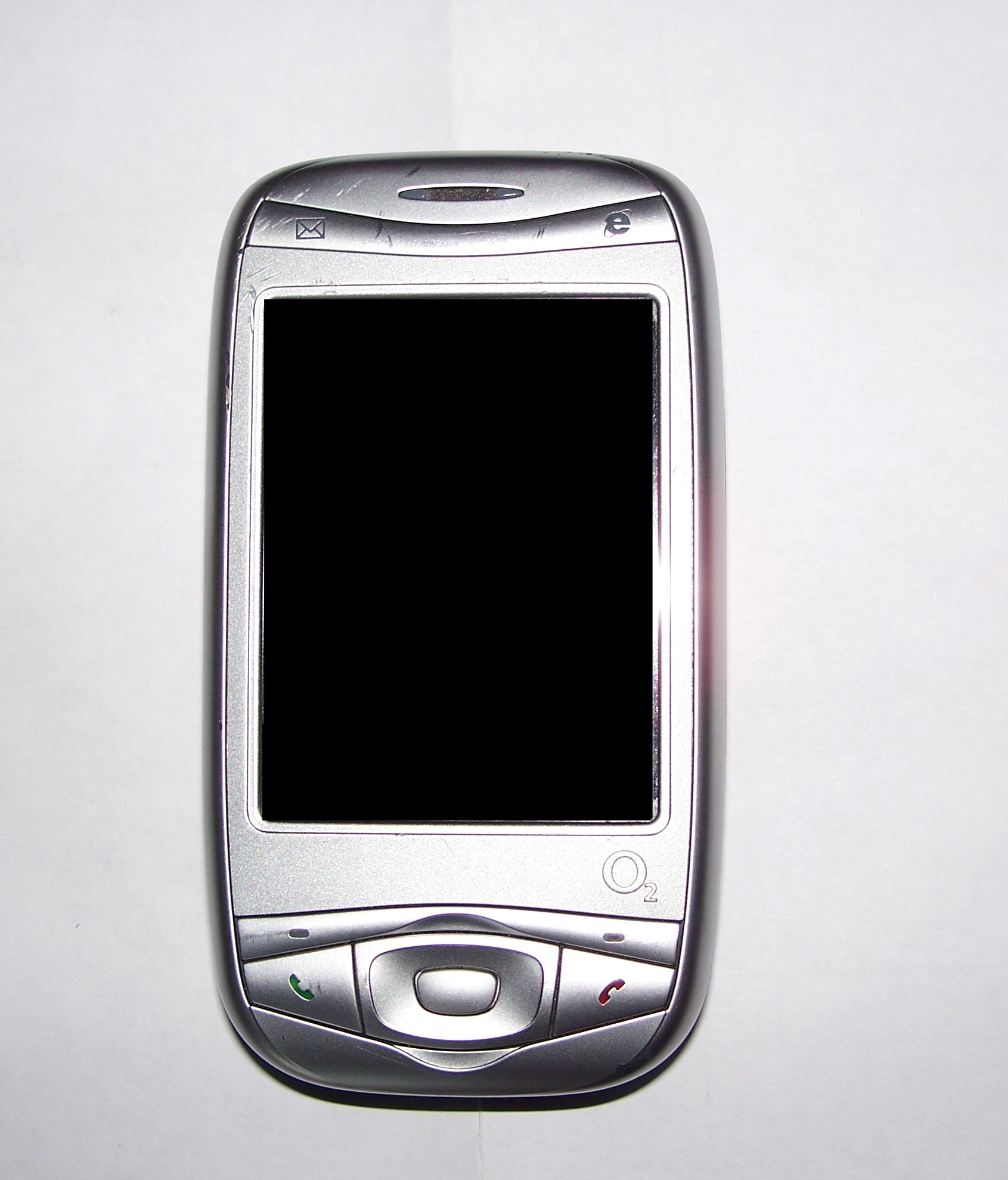
O2 Xda Mini S

The Xda Mini S was released shortly after the Xda Exec, and was the second Xda to run Windows Mobile 5.

- TI OMP 850 200 MHz
- 64 MB SDRAM, 128 MB ROM
- 2.8" Transflective 64K colour LCD (1.3 MP)
- I/O: cable (USB, RS-232), IrDA, Bluetooth v2.0, miniSD flash card, and integrated Wireless LAN (802.11b/g)
- Left Side, Slide-Out 39 key Qwerty Keyboard
- Camera 1.3 MP
- Quad band (GSM 850/900/1800/1900)
- HTC codename: HTC Prodigy / HTC Wizard. Wizard has a squarer cosmetic shell than the Prodigy.

=== Xda Atom ===
The Xda Atom is the latest Model to be released in Asia. It runs Windows Mobile 5 and has approximately the same dimensions as the Xda mini, but has much improved features.

- Intel PXA272 416 MHz
- 64 MB RAM, 128 MB Flash ROM
- 2.7" Transflective 262K color LCD (65,536 effective)
- I/O: cable (USB), IrDA, Bluetooth, miniSD flash card, and integrated Wireless LAN (802.11b)
- Camera Colour 2 MP CMOS camera
- Tri-band GSM/GPRS/EDGE
- Atom is manufactured by Quanta Computer, the first Xda not to come from the HTC stable of Taiwan

The Xda Atom was released in Asia-Pacific region only.

=== Xda Atom Exec ===
- General 2G Network GSM 900 / 1800 / 1900
- Announced June 2006
- Status Discontinued
- Size Dimensions 102 x 58 x 18.5 mm
- Weight 140 g
- Display Type TFT resistive touchscreen, 256K colors (65K effective)
- Size 240 x 320 pixels, 2.7 inches
- Handwriting recognition
- Sound Alert types Vibration; Downloadable polyphonic, MP3, AAC ringtones
- Speakerphone Yes, with stereo speakers
- Memory Phonebook Practically unlimited entries and fields, Photocall
- Call records Practically unlimited
- Internal 64 MB RAM, 192 MB ROM
- Card slot miniSD
- Data GPRS Class 10 (4+1/3+2 slots), 32 - 48 kbit/s
- EDGE Class 10, 236.8 kbit/s
- 3G No
- WLAN Wi-Fi 802.11b
- Bluetooth Yes, v1.2
- Infrared port Yes
- USB Yes, miniUSB
- Camera Primary 2 MP, 1600x1200 pixels, LED flash
- Video Yes
- Secondary No
- Features OS Microsoft Windows Mobile 5.0 PocketPC
- CPU Intel XScale PXA 27x 520 MHz processor
- Messaging SMS, MMS, Email, Instant Messaging
- Browser WAP 2.0/xHTML, HTML (PocketIE)
- Radio FM radio
- Games Solitaire and Jawbreaker
- Colors Silver
- GPS No
- Java Yes, MIDP 2.0
- Pocket Office (Word, Excel, PowerPoint, PDF viewer)
- MP3/AAC/AAC+/WMA/OGG/AMR player
- WMV/MP4 player
- Battery Standard battery, Li-Po 1530 mAh

=== Xda Neo ===
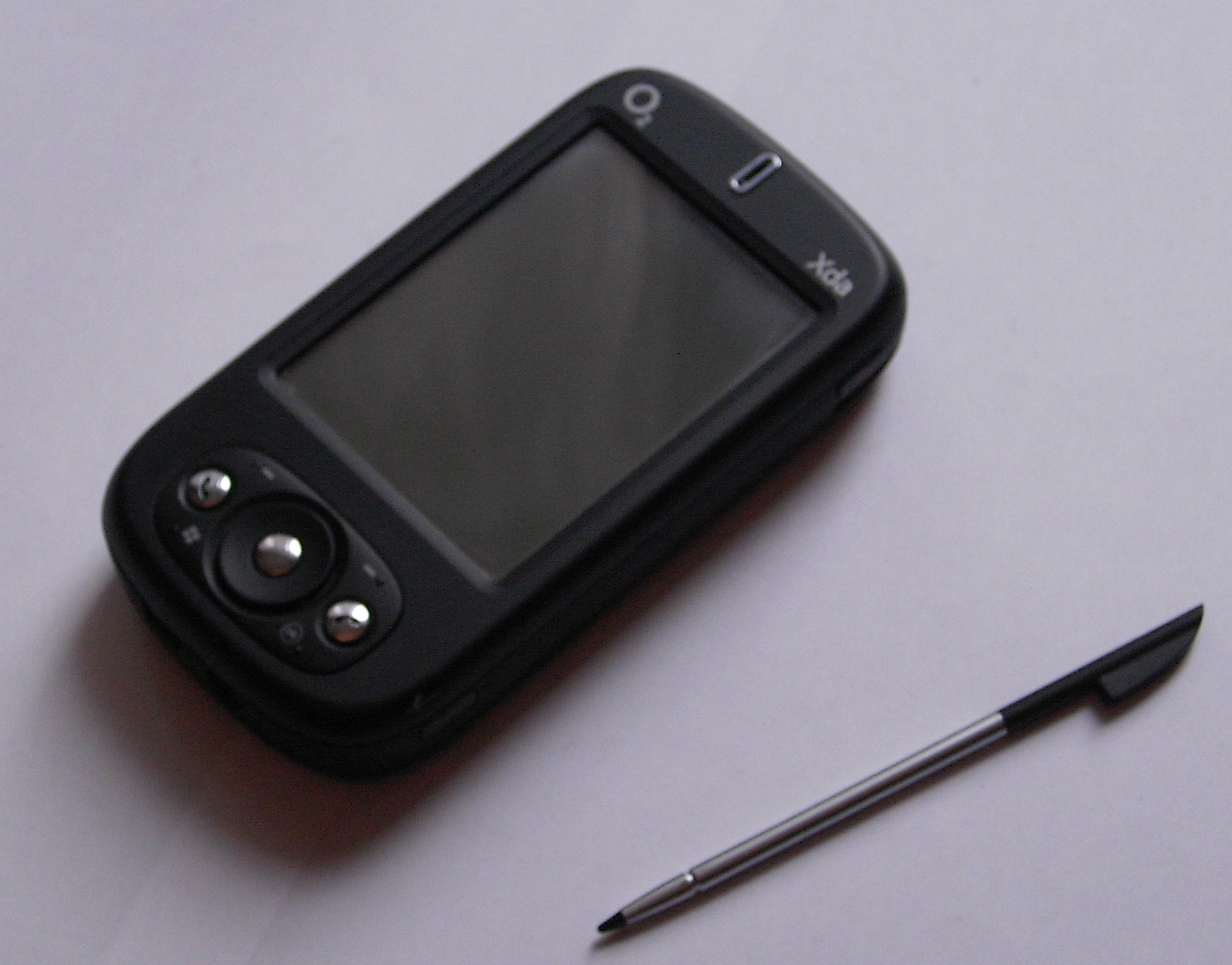
Xda Neo

The Xda Neo was launched by O2 Germany at the CeBIT show in March 2006. Its shape and size are very similar to those of the Xda II mini.

- Texas Instruments OMAP850 195 MHz
- 64 MB SDRAM, 128 MB ROM
- 2.8" Transflective 65K colour LCD
- I/O: cable (USB, RS-232), IrDA, Bluetooth v2.0, SD flash card, and integrated Wireless LAN (802.11b/g)
- Camera 2MP
- Quad band (GSM 850/900/1800/1900)
- HTC codename: HTC Prophet

=== Xda Trion ===
Announced in May 2006, it will be the second 3G-enabled model in the xda range. Like the Exec, it will have two CMOS cameras - a VGA camera on the front for video calls, and a 2-megapixel camera on the back. Other hardware specifications are very similar to the ones of the Mini S.

- Samsung 400 MHz
- 64 MB SDRAM, 128 MB ROM
- 2.8" Transflective 65K colour LCD (1.3 MP)
- I/O: cable (USB, RS-232), IrDA, Bluetooth v2.0, microSD flash card, and integrated Wireless LAN (802.11b/g)
- Camera 2MP
- Left Side, Slide-Out 39 key Qwerty Keyboard
- Quad band (GSM 850/900/1800/1900)
- UMTS 2100 MHz
- HTC codename: HTC Hermes

=== Xda Graphite ===
This candybar sized phone was announced in March 2007 and supports both 3G and WiFi.

- Windows mobile 5.0 or 6.0
- 64 MB RAM, 128 MB ROM, MiniSD expandable memory
- Marvell PXA 270 416 MHz processor
- 2MP camera with front-facing VGA camera for video calling, White LED strobe flash
- 109.5 x 46.9 x 18 mm, Weight with battery: 105g
- 2.2" QVGA 65k colour LCD
- Also known as the ASUS Jupiter

A ROM upgrade is available on the O2 website for Windows Mobile 6

=== Xda Stealth ===
The O2 Xda Stealth was O2's attempt to make a normal mobile phone with GPS while still having full Windows Mobile and PIM Capabilities. This phone has mostly generated average reviews.

- Microsoft Windows Mobile 5.0 PocketPC with phone edition, incorporating Windows Mobile messenger and security pack
- 64 MB RAM, 192 MB ROM, MiniSD expandable memory
- Intel XScale PXA 272 416 MHz processor
- Internal GPS antenna
- 2MP CMOS camerawith auto focus (1st camera pda with auto-focus), White LED strobe flash
- Triband GSM 900 / GSM 1800 / GSM 1900
- 110 x 53 x 22.5 mm, Weight with battery: 140g
- Comes with a slide down number keypad.
- Built-in Wireless LAN 802.11b/g, Bluetooth, USB 1.2
- 2.4" TFT LCD with touch screen
- 240 x 320 dots resolution, 65K colour screen
- Manufactured by Gigabyte Communications.

=== XDA Flame ===
The XDA Flame is the first dual processor PDA-phone announced by O2 in late 2006 and contains enhanced screen graphics, movie playback, photo viewing, and gaming performance.

- 3.6" VGA touch screen
- Intel Xscale(R) PXA 270 processor at 520 MHz.
- 2.0 Mega Pixel camera with Auto-Focus
- NVIDIA(R) GoForce(R) 5500 GPU
- Wireless LAN 802.11b/g
- SRS Mobile HD surround sound
- USB On-The-Go
- 2 GB Flash ROM + 128 MB RAM
- TV out connector (NTSC Only)
- Windows Mobile 5 Professional
- Bluetooth 2.0
- Micro SD expansion slot
- 3G - Tri band phone
- Second camera for video chatting
- Built-in flash for the main camera
- Built-in FM tuner
- Business card reader
- Weight: 190g
- Infrared [Usable as a remote control for appliances such as a TV or Hi-fi]

=== Xda Atom Life ===
Xda Atom Life is one of the fastest HSDPA 3.5G PDAphones, announced by O2 in early 2007 and has enhanced multimedia capabilities. It also has Windows Mobile 6.0 operating system, the upgrade from WM5.0.

- Intel XScale(R) PXA 270 processor at 624 MHz
- 1 GB Flash ROM + 64 MB RAM
- 2.0 Mega Pixel camera with Macro Mode feature
- Wireless LAN 802.11b/g
- Bluetooth 1.2
- SRS Mobile HD surround sound
- Equalizer controls
- Windows Mobile 6.0
- Mini SD expansion slot with miniSDHC support
- 3.5G - Tri band phone
- Second front-facing VGA camera for video calling
- Built-in flash (Twin White LED Strobe Flash) for the main camera
- Built-in FM tuner with RDS feature
- O2 exclusive applications like O2 Media Plus
- Dimensions: 106(L) x 58(W) x 18(T) mm
- Weight: 145g

=== Xda Zest ===
The Xda Zest is an O2 branded Asus P565 handset. The Zest was released in November 2008. It has a 3.2Mp camera, 802.11b/g WiFi, HSDPA, GPS, and 2.8 inch 65k colour touchscreen with a resolution of 640x480 pixels.

=== Xda Serra ===
The Xda Serra is an O2 branded version of the HTC Touch Pro handset was released in November 2008.

=== Xda Ignito ===
The Xda Ignito is an O2 branded version of the HTC Touch Diamond handset was released in August 2008.

=== Xda Mantle ===
The Xda Mantle is an O2 branded version of the HTC P6500 handset and was released in July 2008.

- Windows Mobile 6
- 128 MB RAM, 256 MB ROM
- 400 MHz ARM 11
- GPS Receiver
- Quad band
- 3.5" touch screen
- HSDPA, EDGE and 3G.
- Fingerprint feature, barcode reader .

=== Xda Orbit 2 ===
- Microsoft Windows Mobile 6 Professional
- 128 MB RAM, 256 MB ROM
- Qualcomm MSM7200 400 MHz
- GPS Receiver
- FM Radio
- 3MP Camera
- Quad band (GSM 850/900/1800/1900)
- 58 x 110 x 15.5mm, 130 grams
- TFT touchscreen 65K colors, 240 x 320 pixels, 2.8 inches
- MicroSD card slot
- Gprs Class 10, Edge Class 10, 802.11b/g Wi-Fi, Bluetooth V2
- Manufacturer: High Tech Computer (HTC)
- HTC codename: HTC Polaris 100 (P3650) (sometimes just called Polaris) (Model also branded as HTC Touch Cruise)

=== Xda Stellar ===
The Xda Stellar was released on 26 November 2007.

- Microsoft Windows Mobile 6 Professional
- 128 MB RAM, 256 MB ROM
- Qualcomm MSM7200 400 MHz processor
- GPS Receiver (SIRF Star III)
- 3MP Camera
- 3G, Quad band, WLAN
- 59 x 112 x 18.6 mm, 190 grams
- 2.8", QVGA, 64k colour screen
- MicroSD card slot
- Based on the HTC TyTN II.
