= HTC Touch Dual =

Smartphone model

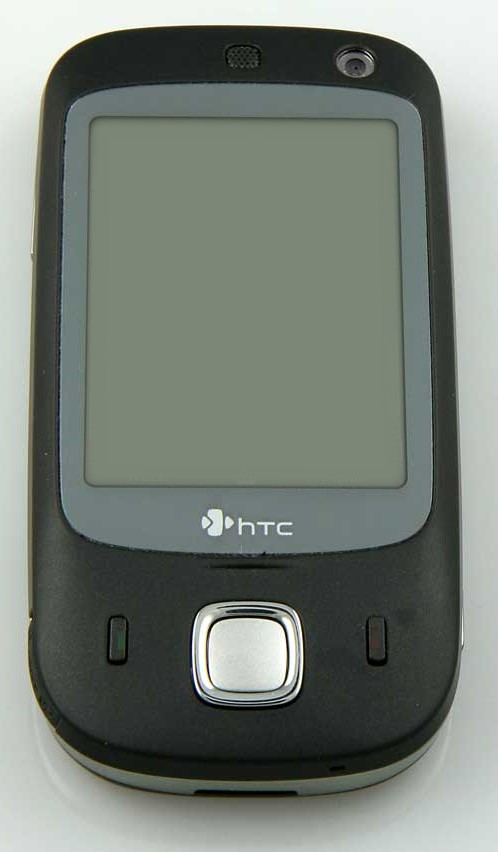
- Manufacturer: HTC
- Type: Smartphone
- Series: HTC Touch family
- Availability by region: 2007; 19 years ago
- Predecessor: HTC Touch
- Successor: HTC Touch Pro
- Compatible networks: HSDPA (3.5G), Tri band GSM / GPRS / EDGE, GSM 900, GSM 1800, GSM 1900 CDMA EVDO
- Form factor: Slider
- Dimensions: 107×55×15.8 mm (4.21×2.17×0.62 in)
- Weight: 120 g (4 oz)
- Operating system: Windows Mobile 6 Professional
- CPU: Qualcomm MSM 7200, 400MHz
- Memory: 256 MB ROM, 128 MB SDRAM
- Removable storage: MicroSD
- Battery: 1,120mAh Li-polymer battery
- Rear camera: 2 Megapixels (Back)
- Front camera: CIF CMOS colour (Front)
- Display: 320x240 px, 2.6 in, TFT LCD
- Connectivity: USB 2.0, Bluetooth 2.0
- Data inputs: Keypad, Touchscreen

The HTC Touch Dual, also known by its codename, Niki (a.k.a. Nike), is a Windows Mobile-powered Smartphone in the HTC Touch family. It is designed and manufactured by HTC Corporation and was announced in October 2007 and released in November that year.

== History ==
The HTC Touch Dual was announced on October 1, 2007, in London, and launched on Orange in the UK in late November 2007. From 2008 it was made available on T-Mobile as the MDA Touch Plus, on O2 UK as the XDA Star, and on Bell and Telus Mobility in Canada as the HTC Touch Dual. In the UK all versions will be the 16-key variant, while the 20-key variant will be available in mainland Europe, North America, and elsewhere. On January 28, 2008, it was made available for Telstra's NextG network.

== Features ==
=== General ===
The HTC Touch Dual runs the Microsoft operating system Windows Mobile 6.1 Professional, and features the ability to install others. It comes with a 2-megapixel camera on the back for taking pictures and shooting videos, and some versions have a second camera on the front of the device for video calls. The phone can connect to HSDPA networks.

=== Interface ===
A stylus is provided for some touch interaction. Like its sibling, the HTC Touch, the Touch Dual features TouchFLO technology gesture-based access to the most used features of the phone. This runs on top of the Windows Mobile operating system. However, unlike its predecessor, the Touch Dual does not have built-in WiFi.

The phone uses a sliding keypad and this comes in two variants depending on model and geographic location. The 16-key variant is a standard mobile phone keypad, with four added buttons for the Windows Mobile OS (Start, Internet Explorer, Messaging & Back). The 20-key variant is a QWERTY keyboard which does not feature the added Windows Mobile keys.
