= HTC HD2 =

Smartphone model

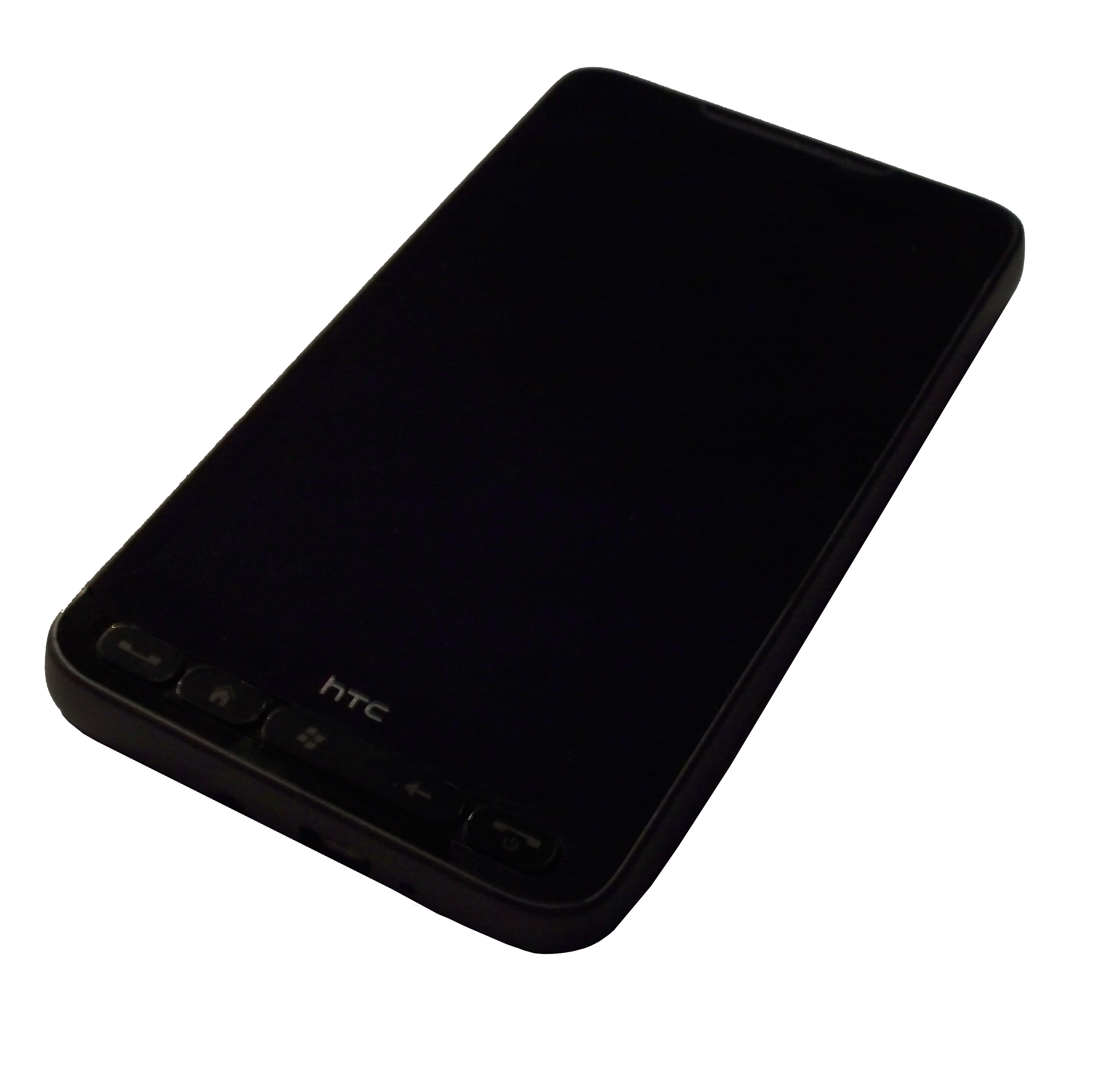
- HTC HD2
- Developer: HTC
- Manufacturer: HTC
- Series: HTC Touch family
- Availability by region: November 2009; 17 years ago
- Predecessor: HTC Touch, HTC Touch HD
- Successor: HTC HD7
- Related: Nexus One, HTC Desire, HTC Evo 4G, HTC HD Mini, HTC Desire HD, HTC Firestone, HTC Tianxi
- Compatible networks: Quadband GSM / GPRS, EDGE and dual band WCDMA, HSDPA, HSUPA
- Dimensions: 120.5 x 67 x 11 mm (4.74 x 2.64 x 0.43 in) (T-Mobile US version 122 x 67 x 11 mm)
- Weight: 162 g (5.54 oz) (157 g T-Mobile US version)
- Operating system: Official: Windows Mobile 6.5 Professional; Unofficial: Windows Phone, Android, Firefox OS, Windows RT, MeeGo, Ubuntu, iOS
- CPU: 1 GHz single-core Qualcomm Scorpion processor (Snapdragon S1 QSD8250 chipset)
- GPU: Adreno 200 (AMD Z430) with OpenGL ES 2.0 support
- Memory: 512MB internal flash ROM (1024MB on T-Mobile US version); 576 MB RAM (Software is limited to using 448 MB on non-US versions)
- Removable storage: microSDHC, up to 32 GB
- Battery: Rechargeable 1230mAh Li-ion battery (2300mAh extended battery available)(up to 490 hrs standby, 6.3 hrs talk time)
- Rear camera: 5 megapixels autofocus CMOS sensor, video up to 800×480 resolution
- Display: 4.3 in. LCD capacitive touchscreen 480x800 px 65k-color WVGA, back-lit TFT LCD
- Connectivity: Bluetooth, 802.11b/g, A-GPS, micro-USB, 3.5mm audio jack
- Data inputs: 2-point multi-touch capacitive touchscreen and stylus pen, proximity sensor, ambient light sensor, 3-axis accelerometer, digital compass (magnetometer)

The HTC HD2 (also known as the HTC T8585, HTC T9193 and HTC Leo), is a smartphone in the HTC Touch family designed and manufactured by HTC. The HD2 natively runs the Windows Mobile 6.5 operating system, and was released in Europe in November 2009, in Hong Kong in December 2009, and in other regions including North America in March 2010. The phone is the successor to the HTC Touch HD, and is succeeded by the HTC HD7.

== History ==
Rumors of the HTC HD2 began appearing in September 2009. It was codenamed Leo, although a decal on the back cover conflictingly identified it as the Pro.Three (which indicates it may have been intended as a bridge between the HTC Touch Pro and HTC Touch), and the "About" info in Bluetooth as the HD2. The specifications sheet released turned out to be true when the HD2 was launched, with the exception of the listed 320MB of RAM, compared to the final 576MB (448MB available to user) of RAM.

== Hardware ==
It is the first smartphone with a 4.3-inch touchscreen, the first Windows Mobile 6.5 phone with a multitouch capacitive screen and HTC Sense, and the second smartphone with a Qualcomm Snapdragon CPU (the first being the Toshiba TG01). The Snapdragon CPU is clocked at 1 GHz, but automatically underclocks itself to 553 MHz if extra processing power is not needed. Tweaks have been made however, to clock the processor dynamically from 96 MHz to 1.61 GHz.

The HD2 is fitted with an Asahi Kasei AK8976A magnetometer. The magnetometer is used for applications such as the pre-loaded digital compass.

=== Accessories ===
HTC sold an optional capacitive stylus pen for the HD2 to aid navigation through the interface. Some Windows Mobile applications were designed to be used with a stylus, rather than finger-touch, and still need a stylus pen to be used effectively.

An extended 'Media' battery was also available officially from HTC. The official unit comes with a replacement battery cover sporting a pull-out metal kickstand which supports the phone in an upright landscape orientation.

The HD2 was sold with a black or brown leather slip-case with a velvet interior in certain countries.

== Software ==
The HTC HD2 runs Windows Mobile 6.5 as its native operating system with Windows CE as its underlying kernel and OS. The HD2 runs HTC Sense as a UI shell on top of Windows Mobile.

=== Upgrades ===
The HD2 was originally slated to be upgraded to Windows Phone (then known as Windows Mobile 7). Microsoft rejected it and other Windows Mobile devices, however, due to it not being compliant with the company's hardware requirements for smartphones running Windows Phone, such as a lack of a dedicated two-stage camera button and five hardware buttons on the front as compared to the three supported.

However, developers have successfully ported Windows Phone to the HD2. Microsoft has expressed tacit and subtle approval of such ports, nearing the release of Mango for native Windows Phone devices. Live services were not available to HD2 as the Windows Phone on the HD2 is not activated. It is possible for users to call Microsoft to request an activation key, but the device is not supported as a WP7 phone and being given a code is not guaranteed.

Unlike its sibling, the HD Mini, the HD2 never received an official upgrade to Windows Mobile 6.5.3, the last stable release of Windows Mobile (the HD2 natively runs 6.5.0). However, several developers at XDA Developers prepared unofficial 6.5.3 and 6.5.5 (the latter being the last unstable release of Windows Mobile) ROMs for the HD2.

=== Modifications ===
The ability to 'mod' the HTC HD2 and run multiple different operating systems from the NAND flash or SD card has given it an enduring popularity, and this made the HTC HD2 one of the phones that could run the largest number of operating systems in the world.

Android (versions 2.2 Froyo, 2.3 Gingerbread, 4.0.4 Ice Cream Sandwich, 4.1 Jelly Bean, 4.2 Jelly Bean, 4.3 Jellybean, 4.4 Kitkat, 5.0 Lollipop, 6.0 Marshmallow 7.0 Nougat and 8.1 Oreo), Ubuntu, MeeGo and Windows Phone have all been unofficially ported to the HD2. In addition, many customised versions of Windows Mobile are available for the device, with versions 6.1, 6.5, 6.5.3 and 6.5.5 available.

FPSECE (First PlayStation Emulator for Windows CE), a PlayStation emulator for Windows CE devices, was ported to the HD2 in December 2009, a few months after the initial release of the HD2.

In early October 2010, a video was released that appeared to show a HD2 booting into Windows Phone by way of Russian developer Cotulla's MAGLDR tool (a bootloader), which was initially created to allow the booting of Android from the device's NAND flash. As of 13 January 2011, MAGLDR and a Windows Phone 7 ROM are publicly available. Windows Phone Genuine checks prevent access to Windows Live services. A solution to this problem has been found, though the legality of the activation is still not fully known, and is frowned heavily upon by Microsoft.

Windows Phone 7.5 was ported to the HD2 in August 2011, a month after ROM developers at XDA Developers made a successful attempt to run a beta version on the device.

On 23 December 2012, XDA developer zoid created a custom Debian/Ubuntu-based Pentest-focused distribution called ubnhd2 for the HTC HD2.

On 6 May 2013, an XDA developer successfully ported Firefox OS to the HTC HD2.

In August 2013, a group of developers on XDA successfully ported HTC Sense 5 to the HTC HD2.

In November 2015, XDA Senior Member macs18max successfully ported Android 6.0 Marshmallow to the HTC HD2.

In September 2016, CyanogenMod 14 which is based on Android 7.0 Nougat was ported to the HTC HD2 successfully.

As of October 2026, there is an ongoing port of iOS 7 successfully loading it's interface on HTC HD2.

== Reception ==
=== Commercial reception ===
When launched in the UK, Vodafone quickly sold all of its stock and developed a backlog of orders, and O2 delayed putting the HD2 on its website so that it could fulfill all orders. Similarly, in the US, the HTC HD2 sold out in most T-Mobile stores within 4 hours and T-Mobile struggled to keep it in stock for several weeks.

Certain T-Mobile locations ran a promotion that stated that iPhone users who traded in their handsets could get anywhere from $100 to $350 off the HD2.

The HTC HD2 became notoriously difficult to get hold of in the UK and Europe. At one point, there was a high level of demand for the product amongst businesses, due to the fact that many have apps that operate solely on the Windows Mobile 6.5 operating system.

== See also ==
- TouchFLO 3D
- HTC Touch
- HTC Touch HD – the predecessor to the HD2.
- HTC HD Mini – a variant of the HD2, with lower specs and running Windows Mobile 6.5.3
- Pocket PC – the HD2's basic software and hardware platform.
- Information appliance
- Technological convergence
