= S630 =

S630 may refer to:

- S630 Aristo, a TOM'S complete car
- Canon S630, a Canon S Series digital camera
- HTC S630, a tri band mobile phone
