= HTC Touch 3G =

- Manufacturer: High Tech Computer Corporation
- Series: HTC Touch family
- First released: November 2008; 17 years ago
- Predecessor: HTC Touch
- Compatible networks: Quad band GSM/GPRS/EDGE (GSM 850, GSM 900, GSM 1800, GSM 1900); Dual band UMTS/HSDPA/HSUPA (UMTS 900, UMTS 2100)
- Dimensions: 102 mm (4.0 in) (h) 53.6 mm (2.11 in) (w) 14.5 mm (0.57 in) (d)
- Weight: 96 g (3.4 oz)
- Operating system: Windows Mobile 6.1 Professional
- CPU: Qualcomm MSM7225 at 528 MHz
- Memory: 192 MiB RAM; 256 MiB ROM
- Removable storage: microSD
- Battery: 1100 mAh Lithium-ion polymer battery, user accessible
- Rear camera: 3.2 megapixel Fixed focus back
- Display: 320x240 px, 2.8 in (71 mm), TFT LCD
- Connectivity: USB Mini; Bluetooth 2.0 + EDR + A2DP; Wi-Fi (802.11b/g)
- Data inputs: Touchscreen

The HTC Touch 3G is a Windows Mobile smartphone developed by the HTC. It was announced in September 2008 and released the following November. Part of the HTC Touch Family, it features quad band GSM and dual band UMTS connectivity, as well as a version of the proprietary TouchFLO 3D user interface developed by HTC.

== Specifications ==
The following specifications are those found on the HTC website.

- Screen size: 2.8 in (71 mm)
- Screen resolution: 320 x 240
- Qualcomm MSM7225 528 MHz processor
- RAM: 192 MB
- ROM: 256 MB
- Quad band GSM/GPRS/EDGE (GSM 850, GSM 900, GSM 1800, GSM 1900)
- Dual band UMTS/HSDPA/HSUPA (UMTS 900, UMTS 2100)
- GPS and A-GPS
- Wi-Fi (802.11b/g)
- Bluetooth 2.0 + EDR & A2DP
- 3.2-megapixel rear-facing camera with fixed-focus
- Mini USB (HTC ExtUSB)
- microSD slot (SD 2.0 compatible)
- Operating system: Windows Mobile 6.1 Professional
- Input devices: touchscreen, touch-sensitive front panel buttons
- Battery: 1100 mAh
- Talk time: 360 minutes for WCDMA, 400 minutes for GSM
- Standby time: 450 hours for WCDMA, 365 hours for GSM
- Size: 102 mm (4.0 in) (h) 53.6 mm (2.11 in) (w) 14.5 mm (0.57 in) (d)
- Weight: 96 g (3.4 oz) with battery

== See also ==
- HTC Touch
