= HTC Touch Viva =

- Manufacturer: High Tech Computer Corporation
- Series: HTC Touch family
- Compatible networks: Quad band GSM/GPRS/EDGE (GSM 850, GSM 900, GSM 1800, GSM 1900)
- Dimensions: 104.5 mm (4.11 in) (h) 59 mm (2.3 in) (w) 15.75 mm (0.620 in) (d)
- Weight: 110 g (3.9 oz)
- Operating system: Windows Mobile 6.1 Professional
- CPU: Texas Instruments OMAP 850 at 201 MHz
- Memory: 128 MiB RAM; 256 MiB ROM
- Removable storage: microSDHC
- Battery: 1100mAh mAH Lithium-ion polymer battery, user accessible
- Rear camera: 2 megapixel Fixed focus back
- Display: 320x240 px, 2.8 in (71 mm), TFT LCD
- Connectivity: USB Mini; Bluetooth 2.0 + EDR + A2DP; Wi-Fi (802.11b/g)
- Data inputs: Touchscreen

The HTC Touch Viva is a Windows Mobile smartphone developed by the High Tech Computer Corporation of Taiwan. Part of the HTC Touch Family, it incorporates quad band GSM, as well as the proprietary TouchFLO 3D user interface developed by HTC.

== Specifications ==
The following specifications are those found on the HTC website.

- Screen size: 2.8 in (71 mm)
- Screen resolution: 320 x 240
- Input devices: Resistive Touchscreen with Stylus, Hardware Keys
- Battery: 1100 mAh
- Talk time: 480 minutes
- Standby time: 270 hours
- 2-megapixel rear-facing camera with fixed-focus
- Texas Instruments OMAP 850 201 MHz processor
- RAM: 128 MB
- ROM: 256 MB
- microSDHC
- Operating system: Windows Mobile 6.1 Professional, Android (unofficial)
- Quad band GSM/GPRS/EDGE (GSM 850, GSM 900, GSM 1800, GSM 1900)
- Wi-Fi (802.11b/g)
- Bluetooth 2.0 + EDR & A2DP
- Mini USB (HTC ExtUSB)
- Size: 104.5 mm (4.11 in) (h) 59 mm (2.3 in) (w) 15.75 mm (0.620 in) (d)
- Weight: 110 g (3.9 oz) with battery
