= Samsung E3210 Hero =

Mobile phone model

Samsung GT-E3210
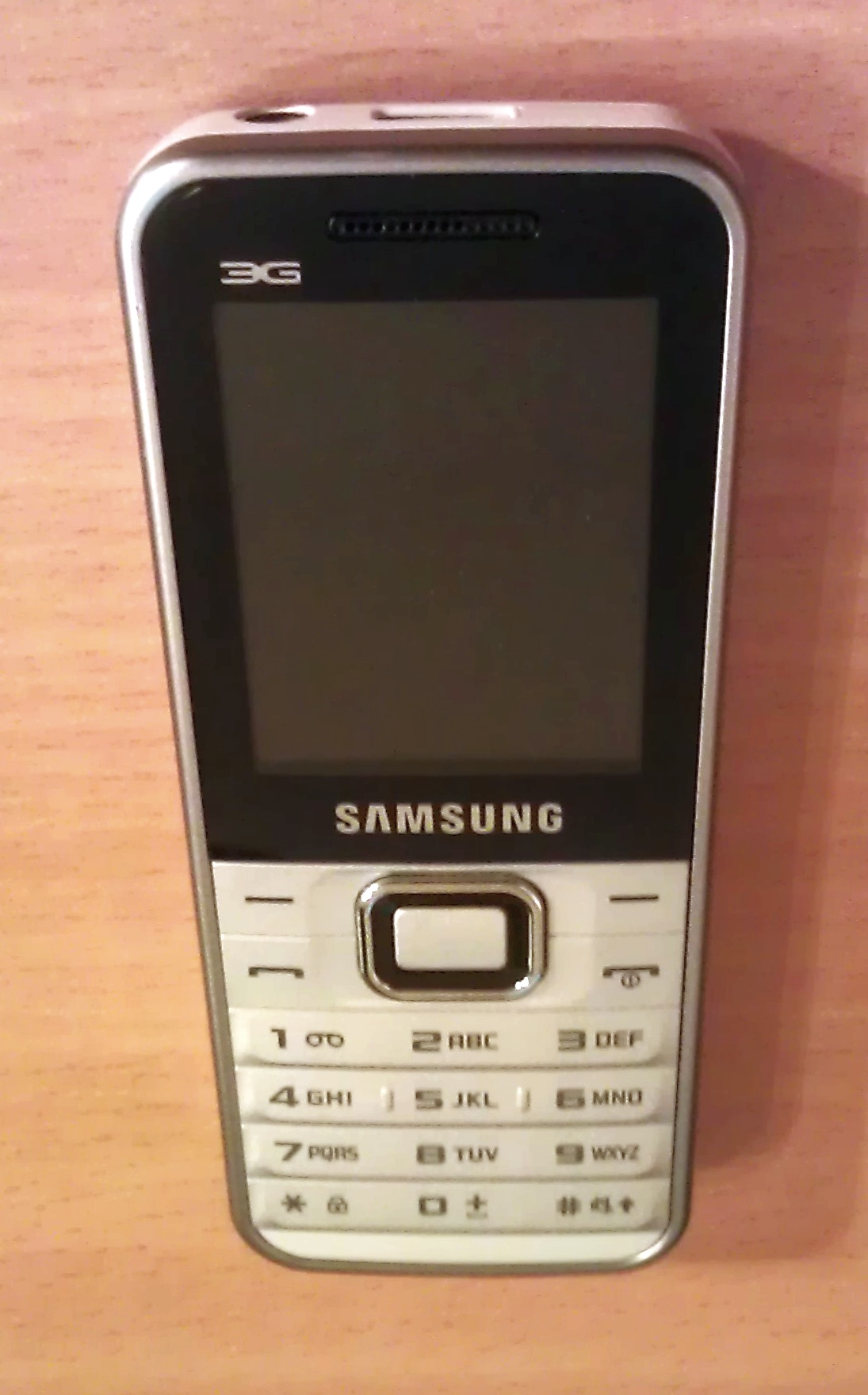
- Manufacturer: Samsung
- Type: Feature phone
- Availability by region: May 2011
- Related: Samsung GT-E3300
- Compatible networks: GSM 850 GSM 900, GSM 1800, GSM 1900, HSDPA 900, HSDPA 2100
- Form factor: Barpredecessor =
- Dimensions: 112.8×46.4×12.9 mm (4.44×1.83×0.51 in)
- Weight: 79.3 g (3 oz)
- Operating system: SGP OS
- Storage: 36 MB data, 1000 contacts, 500 SMS slots
- Removable storage: MicroSD up to 8GiB
- Battery: Li-ion 800 mAh
- Rear camera: VGA
- Display: 128×160px, 2", 65K CSTN
- Connectivity: Bluetooth 2.1, GPRS Class 12, EDGE Class 12, HSDPA 3.6 Mbps
- Data inputs: Numeric keypad

The Samsung E3210 (or Hero) is a mobile phone designed for a lower budget smartphone market. It features J2ME applications

The battery supports up to 23 days of standby (3G: 14 days) or 8 hours of talk time (3G: 3 hours).

SAR 0.715 W/kg
