= Triband =

Triband may refer to:

- Tri band, an electronic device (e.g. a cellphone) that can operate in three frequency bands
- Triband (flag), a flag with three stripes
- Triband (company), a Danish video game company
