= HTC Touch Diamond =

Pocket PC by HTC

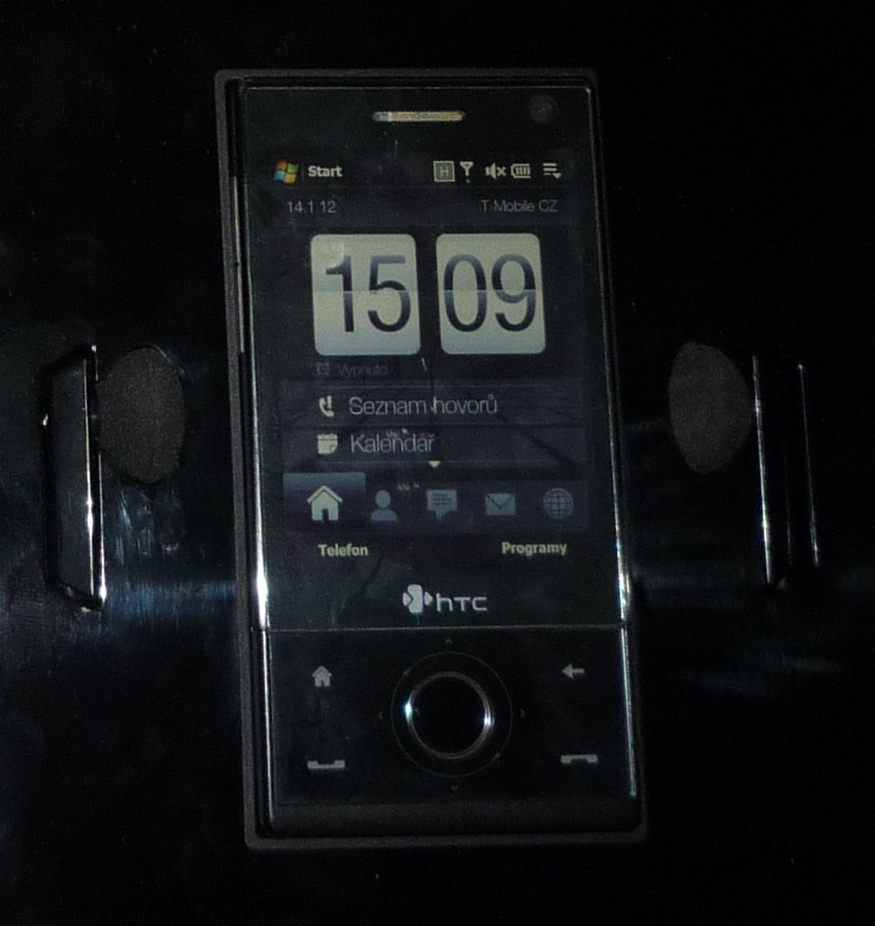
- Manufacturer: High Tech Computer Corporation
- Series: HTC Touch family
- Availability by region: May 2008; 18 years ago
- Predecessor: HTC Touch
- Successor: HTC Touch Diamond2
- Related: HTC Touch Pro
- Dimensions: 102 × 51 × 11.5 mm (4 × 2 × 0.45 in)
- Weight: 110 g (3.9 oz)
- Operating system: Windows Mobile 6.1 Professional
- CPU: 528 MHz Qualcomm MSM7201A
- Memory: 256 MB internal flash 192 MB RAM; 4 GB internal storage
- Battery: Rechargeable 900-mAh Li-ion battery (up to 396 hrs standby, 5.5 hrs talk )
- Rear camera: 3.2-megapixel CMOS color VGA CMOS color secondary
- Display: 2.8-in. LCD touchscreen 480×640 px 65k-color VGA TFT
- Connectivity: Quadband (after July 2008 ROM update) WCDMA/UMTS, GSM / GPRS, EDGE, HSDPA, HSUPA, Bluetooth 2.0, 802.11 b/g, A-GPS, USB
- Data inputs: Touchscreen
- Hearing aid compatibility: M4

The HTC Touch Diamond, also known as the HTC P3700 or its codename the HTC Diamond, is a Windows Mobile 6.1-powered Pocket PC designed and manufactured by HTC. It is the first device to feature TouchFLO 3D - a new version of the TouchFLO interface, unique to the Touch family. The HTC Touch Diamond was first available in Hong Kong in late May 2008. It was available across all major European carriers in June 2008, and later in the year in other parts of the world. The American Touch Diamond was launched on September 14, 2008 on the Sprint network, and April 10, 2009 on the Verizon Wireless network. The European release date was slightly delayed by a last-minute ROM update. The carrier bound names for this phone include T-Mobile MDA Compact IV, O2 XDA Diamond and O2 XDA Ignito. It is the official successor of the HTC Touch.

The successor to the Touch Diamond - the HTC Touch Diamond2 - was announced in February 2009 for Q2 2009 release outside the US and Q4 release estimated for North America.

== Hardware ==
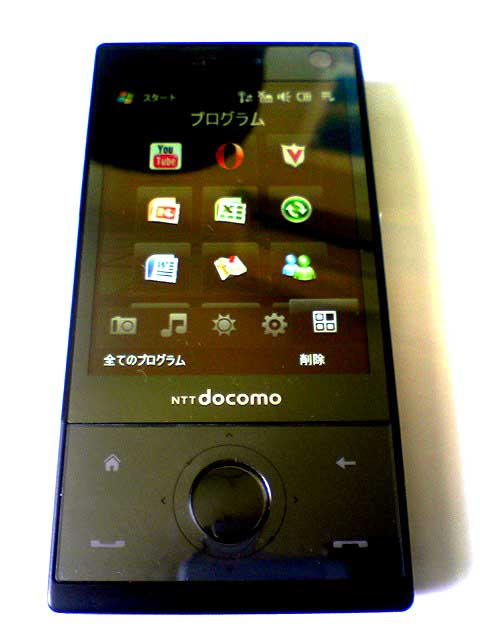
HTC Touch Diamond for NTT DoCoMo (HT-02A)

HTC opted for resistive technology for the touchscreen. The reason cited by Horace Luke, HTC's Chief Innovation Officer, was that the resistive touch screen is better for Asian character recognition. However, the buttons beneath the screen, as well as being pressable buttons, have capacitive touch sensitivity. This feature is used by the camera application to auto-focus the camera as a finger approaches to press the button that will take a picture.

Luke also noted that this is the thinnest device that HTC has designed to date.

Some people find that the Touch Diamond's battery life is too short. Consequently, batteries offering double the capacity of the included battery are being sold by third parties and HTC itself sells an extended battery with 50% extra capacity.

The screen turns itself off when a person is on a call. This is to prevent the screen accepting unwanted inputs from the user's face when they are making a call, but it also requires the user to turn the screen back on if they want to use the screen. Removing the stylus when in a phone call both turns on the screen and starts up the notes application (if so selected as an option by the user).

== Software ==
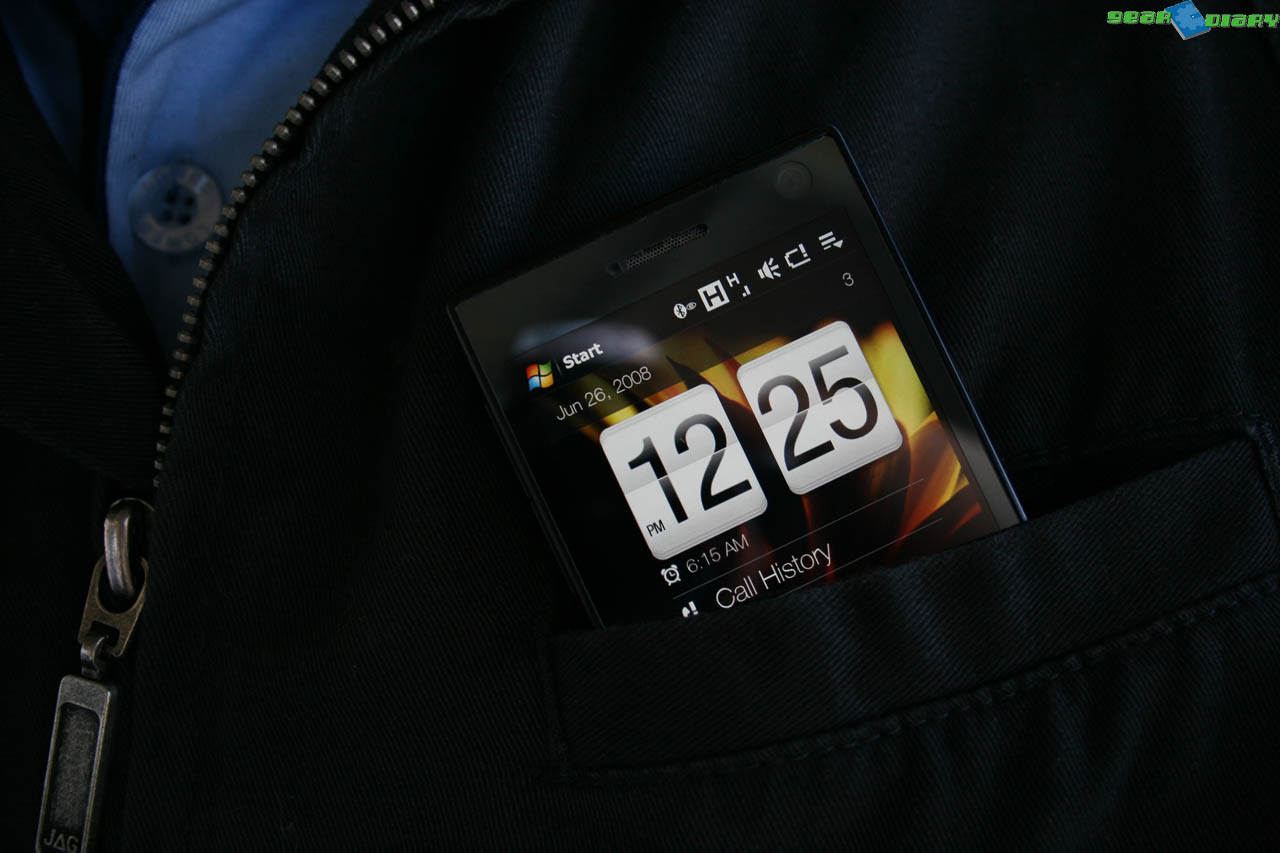
TouchFLO 3D on the HTC Touch Diamond

In addition to the standard features of Windows Mobile, the following additional software is included on the Diamond:

=== TouchFLO 3D ===
TouchFLO 3D Home tab

The Touch Diamond uses HTC's unique TouchFLO 3D user interface. This interface makes it easier for users to accomplish common tasks using their fingers rather than a stylus. TouchFLO 3D consists of tabs, and the user switches between tabs by sliding their finger along the row of tabs at the bottom of the screen.

=== Opera ===
The Touch Diamond uses Opera Mobile as its default Web browser, though Internet Explorer, a standard part of Windows Mobile, is also included. It offers features such as tabbed browsing, improved zoom features, and text reflow. The browser can change the orientation of the page between portrait and landscape modes depending on the way the accelerometer senses the device is being held (not in Internet Explorer). Opera is also capable of downloading any file directly to the device, as long as the device's internal storage has enough free space.

=== YouTube ===
The Touch Diamond includes a YouTube program that allows users to search for videos, maintain a list of their favorite videos, and view featured videos.

=== Teeter ===
Teeter is a videogame utilizing the accelerometer of the Touch Diamond in which the player guides a ball to a target by tilting the device, avoiding obstacles such as walls and holes. The device vibrates when the ball hits a wall, giving the illusion that a real ball is inside the device.

== Android ==
The XDAndroid project makes it possible to run Android on HTC Windows Mobile phones, including the Touch Diamond.

== Sales ==
Over one million units were shipped in six weeks, compared to the HTC Touch, which took 5 months to reach the same milestone. HTC consequently raised its sales projection for 2008 from two to three million units. HTC said in 2009 that the sales projection was met.

== See also ==
- TouchFLO
- TouchFLO 3D
- HTC Touch Family
- Information appliance
- Technological convergence
- Sony Ericsson Xperia X1
