= TouchFLO 3D =

Graphical user interface for HTC devices

TouchFLO 3D (VGA version) Home tab

TouchFLO 3D is a graphical user interface designed by HTC. It is used in the HTC Touch Family of Pocket PCs and was preceded by TouchFLO. TouchFLO 3D has been ported to Windows Mobile and Android, and is used in the HTC Touch Diamond, Touch Pro, Touch HD, Max 4G, Touch Diamond2 and Touch Pro2. The Touch Viva, Touch 3G and Touch2 have a simpler version entitled TouchFLO 2D, where they have the same scrolling tab on the bottom of the screen, however they do not have any 3D visual effects. From the HTC Hero and HTC HD2 onwards, TouchFLO 3D has been heavily extended and is now being referred to, along with other usability improvements, as HTC Sense. The HTC Touch2 runs a version of TouchFLO 2D that is similar in style to HTC Sense.

== Main elements ==
=== Today screen plugin ===
The Today screen plugin is the main aspect of TouchFLO 3D, and consists of several tabs, which can be viewed by sliding a finger along the bottom bar or touching one of the visible icons. The tabs to the immediate right and left of the current tab can be accessed by swiping in the relevant direction. The tabs are:

- Home - Displays the date and time, the time the alarm is set for, any missed calls, and upcoming calendar appointments. Flicking the clock upwards reveals more appointments.
- People - Shows pictures of contacts in a Rolodex style which can be flipped through. An alternate slider bar of contacts is also included on the right side of the tab for faster browsing. On the Touch Diamond2 and Touch Pro2, when a contact is selected, TouchFLO 3D tabs related to that contact appear:
  - Details - Contact details
  - Messages - All SMS/MMS messages sent between a user and the contact
  - Email - All email received from the contact
  - Updates and Events - Facebook updates and new events related to the contact
  - Call History (All) - All calls between a user and the contact
- Messages - Displays received text messages that fly on and off screen.
- Mail - Displays received email messages, from up to 4 different email accounts, in an envelope. Individual emails may be flipped through.
- Internet - Displays a link to open the Opera web browser, bookmarks to favorite websites, and a built-in YouTube application.
- Calendar - Displays a month view calendar, tapping any box will open the relevant day, displaying a list of appointments for that day. On the Touch Diamond2, the current weather and the forecast weather will appear on the corresponding day in this view.
- Stock - Displays graphs and quotes for user-selected companies. If the right softkey is touched, it will bring up a small 2 tab "TouchFLO" menu to view markets and individual companies. Not available on the HTC Touch Diamond and HTC Touch Pro.
- Photos and Videos - Shows photos and videos that can be flipped through, and buttons to launch the camera to take pictures and record video.
- Music - Displays cover art of music that flips through in a linear format. Music can be played directly from the tab, and can be forwarded/rewound by touching the progress slider. The library, which can be accessed pressing the Left Softkey, also uses the TouchFLO 3D interface to allow users to sort music by:
  - Now Playing
  - Artists
  - Albums
  - Playlists
  - All Songs
  - Genres
  - Composers
  - Purchased
- Weather - Displays weather for up to 10 cities selected from a predefined list, including a 5-day forecast. Additional cities can be added by disabling TouchFLO and editing the weather database.
- Settings - Provides access to the following system settings:
  - Sync Data - to start ActiveSync
  - Sound - to change the ringtone and profile settings
  - Wallpaper - to set the background image of the Home tab
  - Communications - to turn Airplane Mode, Phone, Bluetooth, and Wi-Fi on or off
  - Customize Tabs - to hide tabs or change the order in which they are displayed. Only available on the HTC Touch HD, HTC Touch Pro 2 and HTC Tilt 2.
  - Data - to change weather download settings
  - About - displays TouchFLO 3D version information
- Programs - Displays a grid of 18 programs that the user can choose to allow them to launch programs quickly. A list of every program installed on the device is also available.

Each tab has two soft keys which provide access to functions associated with a tab or tab customization.

=== System Status Screen ===
Instead of requiring users to touch the small status icons at the top of the screen (battery, volume, signal, etc.), the System Status Screen appears when the system status area is pressed, providing larger, finger-friendly buttons.

== Revisions ==
TouchFLO 3D debuted in 2008 on the HTC Touch Diamond. Early updates removed many of the animations to increase the perception of speed. Since then, it has been altered several times:

=== HTC Touch Pro ===
The Tasks Screen on the HTC Touch Pro

The Tasks screen is only available on the HTC Touch Pro. It may be accessed by opening the keyboard while viewing TouchFLO 3D.

=== HTC Touch HD ===
The HTC Touch HD added the Stock tab and the ability to rearrange or hide tabs. Also, from the Touch HD onwards, TouchFLO 3D was designed for WVGA screens rather than VGA screens.

=== HTC Touch Diamond2/HTC Touch Pro2/HTC Tilt 2 (AT&T) ===
At the 2009 Mobile World Congress, more extensive changes were revealed. A Calendar tab, featuring month and day views, was introduced. The Stock tab was revised; it no longer displays graphs, but instead displays the quote and whether it has increased or decreased. The contacts tab was also changed: tapping on a contact displays a subscreen with several new tabs: a contact details tab, and tabs which display text messages, emails, and the call history associated with that contact. The Settings tab has been expanded to include more aspects such as G-sensor and contact card. In addition, a replacement for the Tasks Screen has been devised: all tabs now have an arrangement in landscape format. To give extra screen space, the slider will shrink to a small button on the bottom left, which when pressed will expand to reveal the entire slider. Alternatively, in both portrait and landscape modes, a quick swipe left or right can flip tabs one at a time.
