= HTC Touch family =

Family of Pocket PCs

The HTC Touch family was a family of Pocket PCs designed and manufactured by HTC Corporation. Its slogan was Discover Touchnology.

== List of models ==
The members of the family, in order of release, are:

- HTC Touch, the first member of the family, featuring EDGE (2.75G), a 2.0-megapixel camera and the first version of TouchFLO.
- HTC Touch Dual, very similar to the original Touch, with the addition of a dial keypad and HSDPA (3.5G), 2.8in screen. but removing support for wi-fi.
- HTC Touch Cruise (2008 model), an improved handset supporting 3.5G and having GPS capabilities.
- HTC Touch Diamond, a significant re-design featuring HSDPA, 4 GB internal storage, a 3.2-megapixel camera, and the first member of the family to feature TouchFLO 3D.
- HTC Touch Pro, very similar to the Touch Diamond, with the addition of a keyboard, a microSD slot, a camera flash and more ROM and RAM, but removing the 4 GB internal storage.
- HTC Touch HD, a device with a much larger screen than its predecessors.
- HTC Touch Viva, an update to the original Touch
- HTC Touch 3G, similar to Viva, but with 3G connection capabilities
- HTC MAX 4G, a device that has integrated GSM/WiMAX capability created specifically for the Russian market.
- HTC Touch Cruise (2009 model), and upgrade to the 2008 model featuring HTC Footprints, which lets you geotag and add text and sound recordings to photos to create a scrapbook of places visited.
- HTC Touch Diamond2, an update to the Touch Diamond, featuring people-centric communication.
- HTC Touch Pro2, an update to the Touch Pro, featuring people-centric communication and upgrades focused on conference-calling capabilities.
- HTC Touch2, an update to the Touch, Touch Viva and Touch 3G - one of the first devices to be released with Windows Mobile 6.5.
- HTC Firestone, a model that was apparently planned to be released in Q3 2009. It was first leaked in July 2009, and was rumoured to have a 600 MHz processor, capacitive screen, externally hot-swappable microSD card and large speakers in the front and rear for music playback; it was positioned as a media-centric device. Later leaks revealed specs that would make it into the HD2. No further leaks occurred after the announcement of the then-Leo (HD2). It is possible that the Firestone evolved into the HD2, with a largely different design, but retaining the same specs.
- HTC HD2, an update to the Touch HD, with the largest screen so far in the family despite being the thinnest member so far of the family. Powered by a Qualcomm Snapdragon, it is the first Windows Phone to feature HTC Sense.
- HTC HD Mini, A smaller version of the HD2, it is the second Windows Mobile phone ever with a capacitive touch display and the first to use an HVGA screen.
- HTC HD7, The third version of the HD series and the successor of the HTC HD2. This Device is one of the first for Microsoft's new mobile OS Windows Phone 7. The hardware is vastly similar to the HD2.
- HTC 7 Pro, an update to the Touch Pro2. It has a 3.6 inch touch screen, which is smaller than its predecessor HTC HD7. This Device is one of the first for Microsoft's new mobile OS Windows Phone.

== Sales ==
The HTC Touch sold 1 million units by October 2007 and HTC expected to sell 1.5 to 1.8 million units by the end of 2007.

Over 1 million HTC Touch Diamonds were shipped in 6 weeks, compared to the HTC Touch, which took 5 months to reach the same milestone. HTC consequently raised its sales projection for 2008 from 2 to 3 million units. HTC said in 2009 that the sales projection was met. When the HTC HD2 was launched in the UK, Vodafone quickly sold all of its stock and developed a backlog of orders, and O2 delayed putting the HD2 on its website so that it could fulfil all orders. Similarly, in the US, the HTC HD2 sold out in most T-Mobile stores within 4 hours and T-Mobile struggled to keep it in stock for several weeks.

== See also ==
- TouchFLO
- TouchFLO 3D
- HTC Sense
