= MSM7000 =

MSM7000 is a series of system-on-a-chip processors manufactured by Qualcomm for handheld devices, especially smartphones.

Generally these SOCs have the following main components:

- Applications processor, ARM1136J-S, running Windows Mobile / Android / Linux / etc.
- Applications DSP, QDSP5000, does coding/decoding for media.
- Baseband processor, ARM9, running a real-time OS and the GSM stack
- Baseband DSP, QDSP4000, does coding/decoding for telephony

Apart from the CPU core the chips contain such hardware as 2D graphics hardware, 3D (OpenGL ES 1.1) graphics hardware, media acceleration hardware (for video decode, etc.), and various interfaces (keyboard, display / MDDI, USB, camera, TV, etc.). They also contain an AXI controller, a kind of memory control unit.

They are widely used in smartphones produced by HTC Corporation (including both Windows Mobile and Android devices), Sony Ericsson, LG Group, Samsung, ZTE, and also other devices like the Zeebo.

== MSM7200, MSM7200A, MSM7201, MSM7201A ==
The A versions have higher specs (frequencies) and a smaller manufacturing process (65 nm vs. 90 nm). The 7x01 versions have a different radio than the 7x00 versions.

Popular phones using these processors:

- MSM7200 400 MHz (384 MHz in real) 90 nm; HTC Touch Dual/Touch Cruise, HTC S730, HTC TyTN II
- MSM7201 400 MHz 90 nm; Palm Treo Pro, Pharos Traveler 117, Pharos Traveler 127
- MSM7200A 528 MHz 65 nm; HTC Magic, HTC Hero GSM, HTC Tilt 2, Motorola CLIQ, Motorola CLIQ XT, Motorola Backflip, Samsung i7500 Galaxy, T-Mobile Pulse UK, Sony Ericsson Xperia X1
- MSM7201A 528 MHz 65 nm; HTC Dream, HTC Magic, HTC Diamond, T-Mobile Comet US(Huawei Ideos U8150), HTC Touch Pro, Zeebo

== MSM7500, MSM7501, MSM7500A, MSM7501A ==
Basically the same as the MSM7200, but with CDMA radio replacing the GSM radio. The A versions have higher specs (frequencies) and a smaller manufacturing process (65 nm vs. 90 nm). The 7x01 versions have a different radio than the 7x00 versions.

== MSM7600, MSM7601, MSM7600A, MSM7601A ==
Same as the MSM7200A, but with both GSM and CDMA functionality, each of which can be optionally disabled. The A versions have higher specs (frequencies) and a smaller manufacturing process (65 nm vs. 90 nm). The 7x01 versions have a different radio than the 7x00 versions.

Popular phones using these processors:

- MSM7600A 528 MHz 65 nm; HTC Hero CDMA, HTC Touch Pro2 - Verizon CDMA specs BlackBerry 8530

== MSM7x25 ==
MSM7225 and MSM7625 was later included in the Snapdragon S1 family, see Snapdragon S1

== MSM7x27 ==
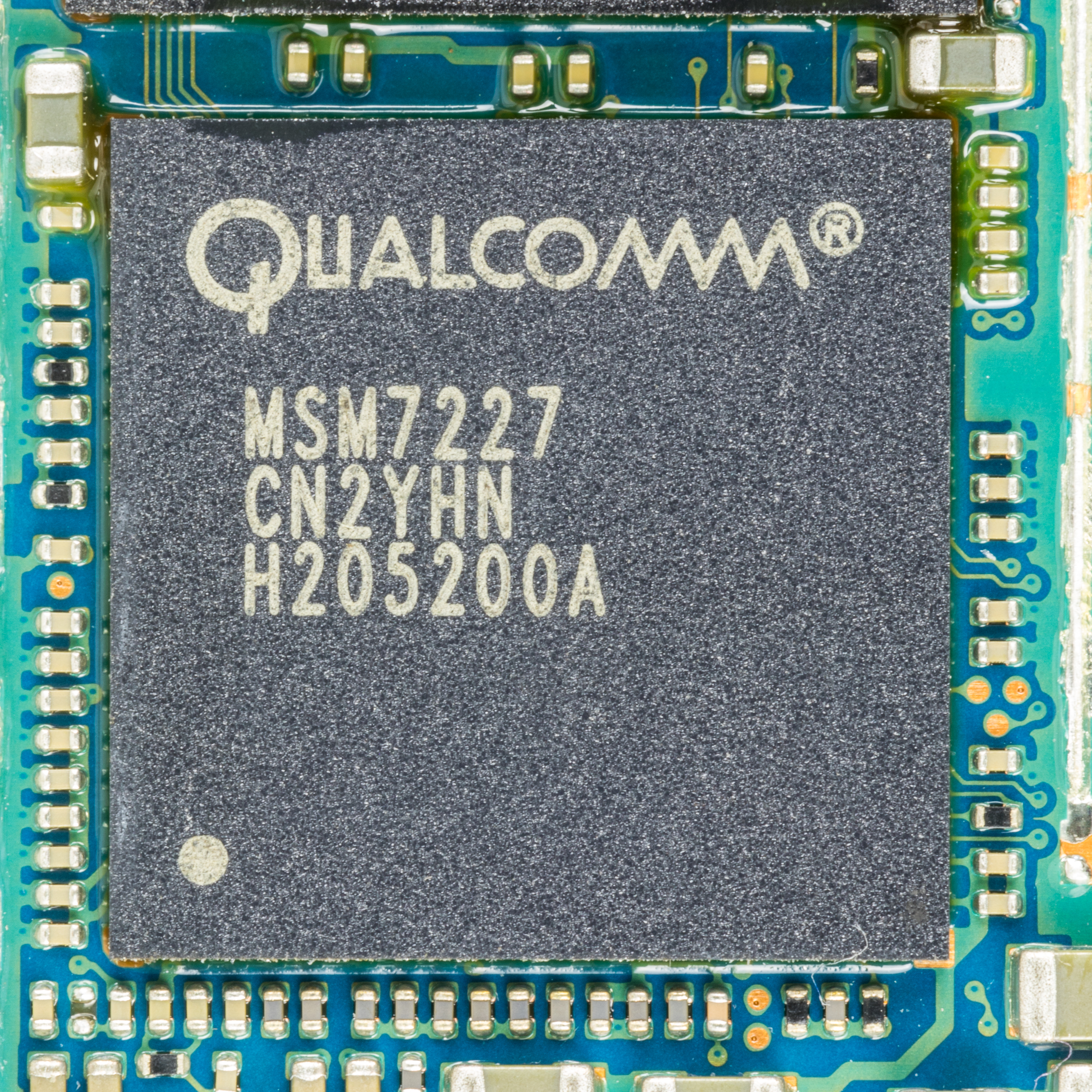
Qualcomm MSM7227A

MSM7227 and MSM7627 was later included in the Snapdragon S1 family, see Snapdragon S1

== MSM7x30 ==
MSM7230 and MSM7630 was later included in the Snapdragon S2 family, see Snapdragon S2
