= Frequency compatibility =

Concepts in telecommunications

In telecommunications, the term frequency compatibility has the following meanings:

1. Of an electronic device, the extent to which it will operate at its designed performance level in its intended operational environment (including the presence of interference) without causing interference to other devices.
2. The degree to which an electrical or electronic device or devices operating on or responding to a specified frequency or frequencies is capable of functioning with other such devices.

== See also ==
- electromagnetic compatibility
