= HTC Touch =

Touchscreen mobile phone

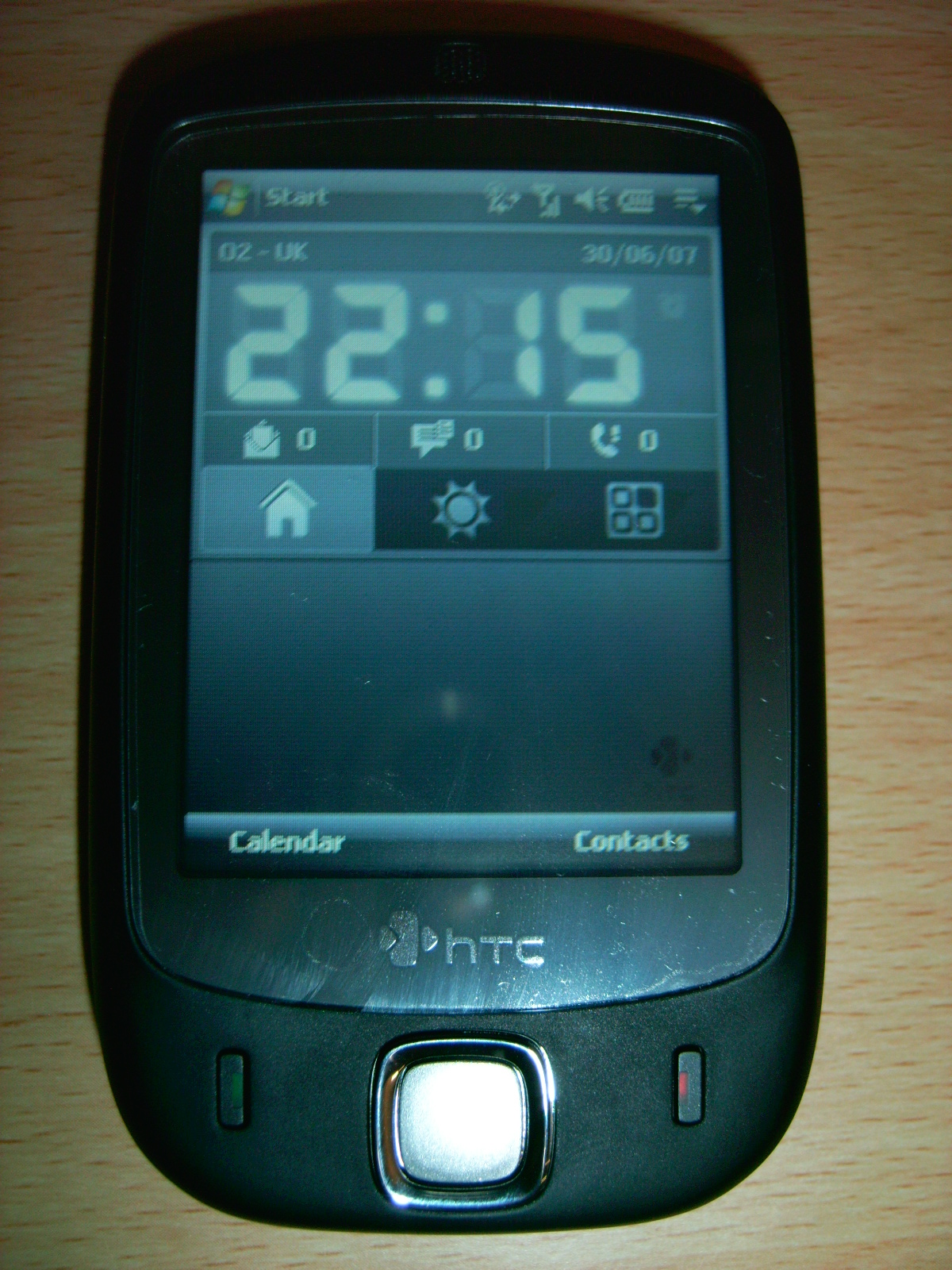
- Manufacturer: High Tech Computer Corporation
- Type: PDA Phone
- Series: HTC Touch family
- Availability by region: June 2007; 19 years ago
- Successor: HTC Touch2
- Related: HTC Touch Dual
- Compatible networks: Tri band GSM / GPRS (Class 10) / EDGE, GSM 900/1800/1900, CDMA
- Dimensions: 99.9×58×13.9 mm (3.93×2.28×0.55 in)
- Weight: 112 g (including battery)
- Operating system: Windows Mobile 6.0, upgrades to 6.1 available via some carriers, 6.5 available via modded ROMS
- CPU: TI OMAP 850 201 MHz (GSM Touch), MSM7500 400MHz (CDMA Vogue)
- Memory: 128 MB internal flash 64 MB SDRAM (GSM Touch), 256 MB internal flash 128 MB SDRAM (CDMA Vogue)
- Removable storage: Micro SD card (SD 2.0 compatible)
- Battery: Rechargeable 1100 mAh Li-ion battery, up to 200 hr standby, 5 hr talk time
- Rear camera: 2.0-megapixel CMOS color
- Display: 65k-color QVGA (320x240 px), 2.8 in, TFT LCD
- Connectivity: Bluetooth 2.0+EDR, 802.11b/g, Mini-USB
- Data inputs: Touchscreen

The HTC Touch, also known as the HTC P3450 or its codename the HTC Elf or the HTC Vogue for the CDMA variant, is a Windows Mobile 6-powered Pocket PC designed and manufactured by HTC. Its main, unique feature is a user interface named TouchFLO that detects a sweeping motion and can distinguish between a finger and a stylus. TouchFLO incorporates stylus-free access to a music player, a photo album, a video player and a picture-based contact book. The global launch of the Touch was in Leicester Square, London, on 5 June 2007, and the phone was initially available in two colours: black and green. The carrier bound names for this phone include Verizon Wireless XV6900, T-Mobile MDA Touch, O2 XDA Nova, Okta Touch and Vodafone VPA Touch.

In November 2007, HTC started to sell an "Enhanced" Touch, also known as the HTC P3452 or its codename the HTC Elfin, with double the RAM and ROM of the original version (128 MB and 256 MB respectively). The newer version is also available in two new colors: white and burgundy.

== Sales ==
HTC shipped 1 million units within 5 months of the launch, and shipped another million in the following 6 months.

== Features ==
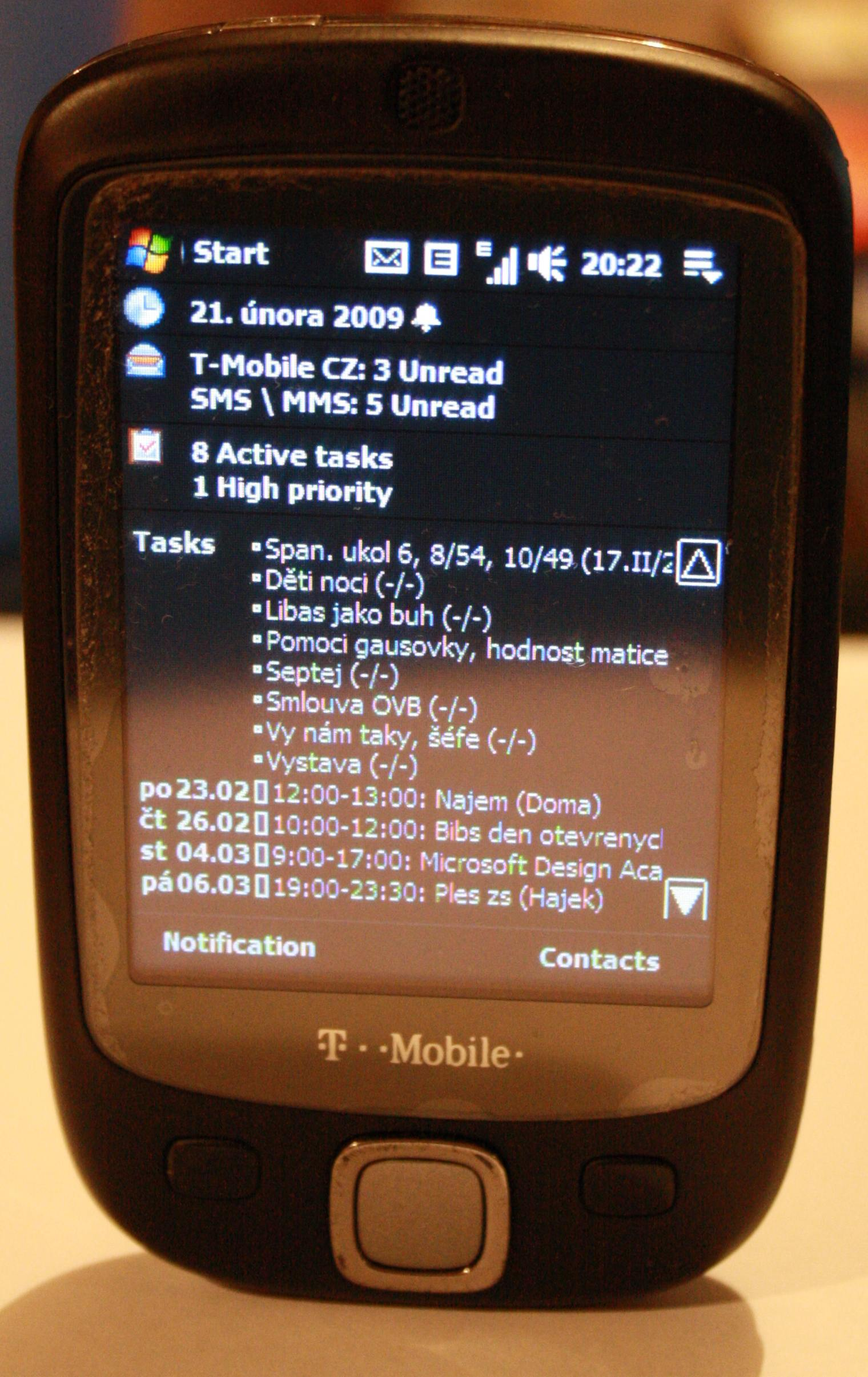
A T-Mobile MDA Touch running WM 6.1

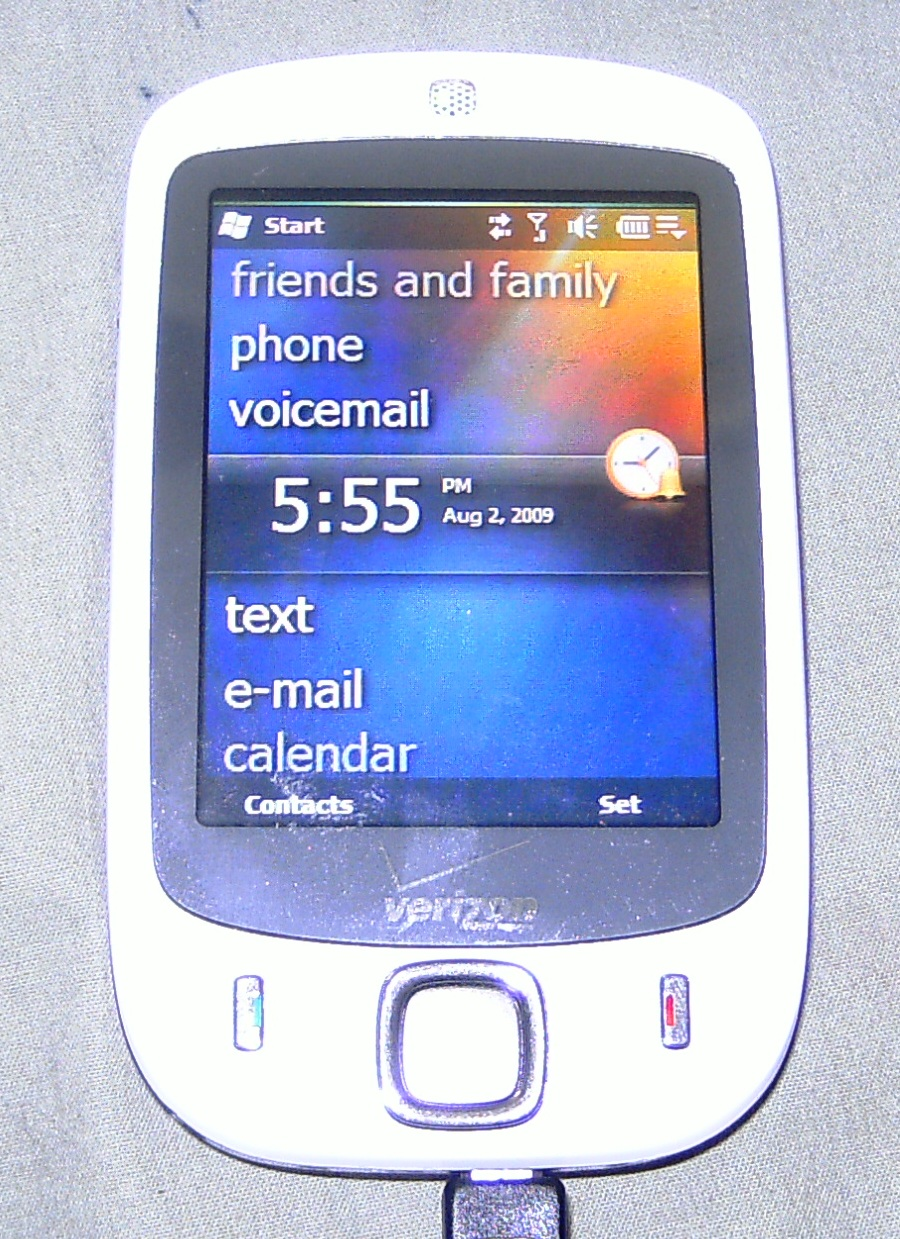
A Verizon Vogue running WM 6.5

- Connectivity
  - Tri band GSM / GPRS (Class 10) / EDGE: GSM 900/1800/1900 (2.75 G)
  - 802.11b/g Wi-Fi
  - Bluetooth 2.0. Supports most common profiles including serial port, FTP, HID (keyboard and mice), headset, hands free, DUN (dial up networking for using the phone as a wireless modem for a notebook or desktop), and A2DP Bluetooth stereo.
  - HTC ExtUSB (11-pin mini-USB & audio jack)
- Input
  - Touchscreen (designed for fingers and the included stylus)
  - 5 -way directional block (including action button)
  - Power and camera buttons
  - TouchFLO
- Memory
  - 128 MB (35.46 MB user-accessible) flash ROM
  - 64 MB (47.89 MB accessible) SDRAM
  - microSD expansion slot (SD 2.0 compatible, 1 GB card included, 16 GB SDHC Tested Successfully)
- Other features
  - TI OMAP 850 201 MHz processor
  - 2.0-megapixel CMOS color camera
  - 2.8 in. LCD screen (240x320 px, 65k-color, QVGA, TFT)

== HTC Vogue ==
The CDMA version of the Touch, known as the "HTC Vogue" or the "HTC P3050", has double the RAM and ROM of the original Touch, a faster 400 MHz processor (QualComm MSM7500), and a faster over the air data capability, but no Wi-Fi. This is sold under the name Okta Touch by Telecom in New Zealand. Also sold as the "HTC Touch" through Sprint Nextel and Alltel and as the "XV6900" through Verizon Wireless in the United States; as the "HTC Touch" by Bell Mobility and Telus Mobility in Canada; and through Raya and i2 Mobile in Egypt.

== Operating system upgrades ==
The Windows Mobile version is upgradable, to 6.5.* via ROMs from XDA-Developers website.

=== Linux and Android conversions ===
Linux and Android operating systems are being ported to these phones. Vogue Linux runs on the HTC Vogue. Wing Linux, an Android version, is in development and available via ROMS, from xda-developers website. Android versions through 2.3 (Gingerbread) have been successfully ported to the CDMA (Vogue) version of the Touch.

== See also ==
- HTC Touch 3G
- TouchFLO
- HTC Touch Family
- O2 Xda Comet
