= HTC Touch Cruise =

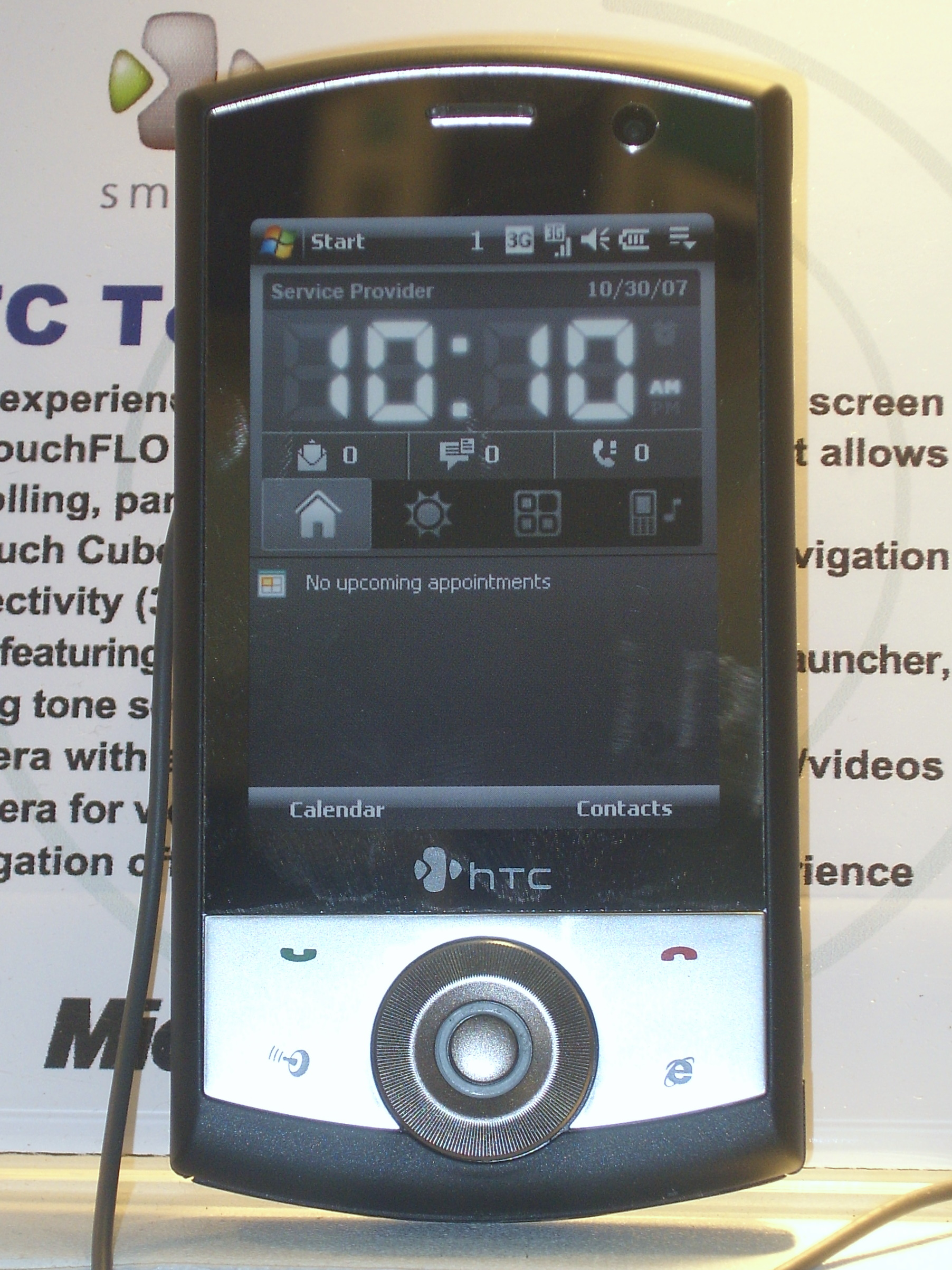
- A picture of the HTC Touch Cruise
- Manufacturer: HTC Corporation
- Type: Smartphone
- Operating system: Windows Mobile 6.0 Professional
- CPU: Qualcomm MSM7200, 400MHz
- Memory: ROM: 256 MB; RAM: 128 MB DDR SDRAM
- Display: 2.8 in. TFT-LCD touchscreen 240x320 px 65k-color QVGA TFT
- Input: Touchscreen
- Camera: 3-megapixel CMOS color; VGA CMOS color
- Connectivity: GSM / GPRS, EDGE, Bluetooth, 802.11b/g, USB 2.0
- Power: Rechargeable 1350mAh Li-ion battery Standby; UMTS: Up to 450 hrs GSM: Up to 400 hrs Talk time UMTS: Up to 4 hrs GSM: Up to 7 hrs Video call: Up to 2.3 hrs AC adapter (100-240 V AC, 50/60 Hz, output 5 V 1 A
- Dimensions: 110 x 58 x 15.5 mm
- Weight: 130 g (including battery)

The HTC Touch Cruise, also known as the HTC P3650 or its codename the HTC Polaris 100, is a Windows Mobile 6-powered Pocket PC. It is designed and manufactured by HTC and was first released in January 2008. In January 2009, HTC announced a completely redesigned device, also called the HTC Touch Cruise (or the HTC Touch Cruise (09); internal codename was Iolite). It was the first device to feature HTC Footprints.

== Features ==
=== Features common to both versions ===
- Connectivity
  - Quad Band GSM / GPRS / EDGE: GSM 850, GSM 900, GSM 1800, GSM 1900
  - Tri Band UMTS/HSDPA 850/1900/2100 MHz
  - Wi-Fi 802.11b/g
  - Bluetooth 2.0 w/EDR
  - HTC ExtUSB (11-pin mini-USB & audio jack)
  - Full speed USB 2.0
  - FM radio
  - GPS
- Memory
  - Expansion slot for microSD (SD 2.0 compatible)
- Input
  - Touchscreen and Stylus
  - 4-way navigation wheel with dual functionality as a scroll wheel with enter button.

=== 2008 model ===
- Memory
  - 256 MB Flash ROM
  - 128 MB DDR SDRAM

=== 2009 model ===
- Memory
  - 512 MB Flash ROM
  - 256 MB DDR SDRAM

== See also ==
- TouchFLO
- HTC Touch Family
- HTC
