= HTC Touch Pro =

Smartphone model

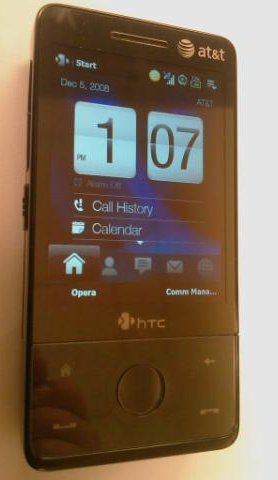
- Manufacturer: HTC
- Series: HTC Touch family
- Availability by region: June 2008; 18 years ago (Contract Free GSM); October 26, 2008; 17 years ago (Sprint); October 11, 2008; 17 years ago (Vodafone); November 11, 2008; 17 years ago (AT&T); November 24, 2008; 17 years ago (Verizon)
- Predecessor: HTC TyTN II
- Successor: HTC Touch Pro2
- Related: Sony Ericsson Xperia X1
- Compatible networks: aGPS; HTC Raphael 100: Quad band GSM 850, 900, 1800, 1900, GPRS, EDGE; Quad band UMTS 850,900,1900, 2100, HSDPA, HSUPA; HTC Raphael 800: Dual band CDMA 800, 1900; Single band EV-DO 2000 1xEV-DO Rev A.
- Form factor: Slide
- Dimensions: 102 mm (4.0 in) (h); 51 mm (2.0 in) (w); 18 mm (0.71 in) (d)
- Weight: 158.9 g (5.61 oz)
- Operating system: Original: Windows Mobile 6.1 Professional Unofficial: Android 1.6 "Donut" if XDAndroid installed and ported to Android
- CPU: Qualcomm MSM7201A ARM 11 at 528 MHz
- Memory: 288 MB RAM; 512 MB ROM
- Removable storage: microSDHC, up to 32 GB
- Battery: 1340mAh mAh Lithium-ion polymer battery, user accessible
- Rear camera: 3.2 megapixel AF back
- Front camera: .3 megapixel front (only on GSM Unlocked version)
- Display: 480×640 px, 2.8 in (71 mm), 285 PPI, 65536 color LCD, 3:4 aspect ratio
- Media: Windows Media Player Mobile
- Connectivity: USB Mini-B; Bluetooth 2.0 + EDR; Wi-Fi (802.11b/g)
- Data inputs: QWERTY Keyboard and Touchscreen
- Hearing aid compatibility: M3

The HTC Touch Pro (also known as the HTC Raphael, AT&T Fuze, XDA Serra, or MDA Vario IV) is a smartphone from the Touch series of Windows Mobile Pocket PCs designed and marketed by HTC Corporation of Taiwan. Released in 2008, it is an enhanced version of the HTC Touch Diamond with the addition of a left-side slide-out QWERTY keyboard, a microSD card slot, and a camera flash.

The Touch Pro smartphone's functions include those of a camera phone and a portable media player in addition to text messaging and multimedia messaging. It also offers Internet services including e-mail, instant messaging, web browsing, and local Wi-Fi connectivity. Depending on its market, it is a quad-band GSM or quad-band UMTS phone with GPRS, EDGE, UMTS, HSDPA, and HSUPA or a tri-band CDMA phone with 1xEV-DO Rev A. All versions feature TouchFLO 3D — a new enhanced version of the TouchFLO interface, unique only to the latest Touch series. In March 2009, HTC announced a new version, the Touch Pro2 which has a larger screen (3.6") and a redesigned slide out (and tilted) QWERTY keyboard with spaces between the keys.

The XDAndroid project makes it possible to run Android on HTC Windows Mobile phones, including the Touch Pro.

== Versions ==
As stated, the HTC Touch Pro has three versions: the Raphael 100, which is GSM or UMTS, the Raphael 800, which is CDMA, and a Verizon-specific CDMA variant with less RAM and a unique keyboard layout, the Raphael 500. Listed below are various companies that have confirmed or are speculated to carry the Pro along with their carrier version names (if any).

- Raphael 100
  - (United States) AT&T: HTC FUZE (RAPH110 model)
  - (United Kingdom) O2 XDA Serra
  - (Japan) NTT docomo HT01A
  - (Japan) SoftBank Mobile X05HT
  - (United Kingdom) / (Germany) / (Netherlands) / (Poland) T-Mobile-UK MDA Vario IV
  - (United Kingdom) Vodafone
- Raphael 500
  - (United States) Verizon
- Raphael 800
  - Bell Canada
  - (Canada) TELUS(Nov. 19th)
  - (United States) Alltel
  - (United States) Sprint
  - (United States) U.S. Cellular
  - (Japan) au E30HT

== Specifications ==
The following specs are for the retail version of the Pro. Carriers may sell versions of the Pro with specifications that vary from this.

- Screen size: 2.8 in (71 mm)
- Screen resolution: 480×640 pixels at 285 ppi, 3:4 aspect ratio
- Screen colors: 65,536 (16-bit)
- Input devices: resistive touchscreen interface and slide-out QWERTY keyboard
- Battery: 1340 mAh, user-accessible
- Battery has up to 6.98 hours of talk and up to 462 hours of standby.
- 3.2 megapixel rear-facing camera with autofocus and flash, .3 megapixel front-facing camera for video calling (Raphael 100 only.)
- Location finding by detection of cell towers and Wi-Fi networks and with internal GPS antenna
- Processor: Qualcomm MSM7201A(GSM) MSM7501A(CDMA) (528 MHz ARM ARM1136EJ-S processor)
- RAM: 288 MB DRAM (192 MB for the Verizon SKU)
- ROM: 512 MB flash memory
- Removable Media: microSDHC, supports up to 32 GB.
- Operating System: Windows Mobile 6.1 Professional
- Quad-band GSM/GPRS/EDGE (GSM 850, GSM 900, GSM 1800, GSM 1900)
- Quad-band UMTS/HSDPA/HSUPA UMTS 850),(UMTS 900, UMTS 1900), UMTS 2100)
- Wi-Fi (802.11b/g)
- Bluetooth 2.0 + EDR
- Mini USB 2.0 (HTC ExtUSB)High speed (480 Mbit/s)
- TV-out
- FM 87.5 – 108 MHz (Only on GSM)
- Ambient Light Sensor
- Accelerometer
- Size: 51 mm (2.0 in) (h) 102 mm (4.0 in) (w) 18 mm (0.71 in) (d)
- Weight: 158.9 g (5.61 oz)

== See also ==
- TouchFLO
- TouchFLO 3D
- HTC Touch Family
