= GSM frequency bands =

International Telecommunication Union-approved frequency bands for GSM

GSM frequency bands or frequency ranges are the cellular frequencies designated by the ITU for the operation of GSM mobile phones and other mobile devices.

== Frequency bands ==
GSM frequency bands
GSM band	ƒ (MHz)	Uplink (MHz) (mobile to base)	Downlink (MHz) (base to mobile)	Channel numbers	Equivalent LTE band / NR band	Regional deployments
T-GSM-380 (Note: T-GSM is Trunking-GSM.)	380	380.2 – 389.8	390.2 – 399.8	dynamic	None	None
T-GSM-410	410	410.2 – 419.8	420.2 – 429.8	dynamic	87/88	None
GSM-450	450	450.6 – 457.6	460.6 – 467.6	259–293	31/72/73	None
GSM-480	480	479.0 – 486.0	489.0 – 496.0	306–340	None	None
GSM-710	710	698.2 – 716.2	728.2 – 746.2	dynamic	12/85	None
GSM-750	750	777.2 – 792.2	747.2 – 762.2	438–511	None	None
T-GSM-810	810	806.2 – 821.2	851.2 – 866.2	dynamic	27	None
GSM-850	850	824.2 – 848.8	869.2 – 893.8	128–251	5	CALA, (Note: CALA: Canada, US, Caribbean, and Latin America) NAR (Note: NAR: North American Region)
P-GSM-900 (Note: P-GSM is the standard or primary GSM-900 band)	900	890.0 – 915.0	935.0 – 960.0	1–124	8 (subset)	None deprecated
E-GSM-900 (Note: E-GSM is the extended GSM-900 band: a superset of the standard GSM-900 band.)	900	880.0 – 915.0	925.0 – 960.0	0–124, 975–1023	8	APAC, (Note: APAC: Asia-Pacific) EMEA (Note: EMEA: Europe, the Middle East and Africa)
R-GSM-900 (Note: R-GSM, or GSM-R, is the Railways GSM-900 band, which also includes the standard and extended GSM-900 bands.)	900	876.0 – 915.0	921.0 – 960.0	0–124, 955–1023	8/100	APAC, EMEA used for GSM-R
T-GSM-900	900	870.4 – 876.0	915.4 – 921.0	dynamic	None	None
DCS-1800 (Note: DCS: Digital Cellular System)	1800	1710.2 – 1784.8	1805.2 – 1879.8	512–885	3	APAC, EMEA
PCS-1900 (Note: PCS: Personal Communications Service)	1900	1850.2 – 1909.8	1930.2 – 1989.8	512–810	2/25	CALA, NAR

== GSM frequency usage around the world ==
A dual-band 900/1800 device is required to be compatible with most networks apart from deployments in ITU Region 2.

=== GSM-900, EGSM/EGSM-900 and GSM-1800 ===
GSM-900 and GSM-1800 are used in most parts of the world (ITU-Regions 1 and 3): Africa, Europe, Middle East, Asia (apart from Japan and South Korea where GSM has never been introduced) and Oceania.

In common, GSM-900 is most widely used. Fewer operators use GSM-1800. Mobile Communication Services on Aircraft (MCA) uses GSM-1800.

In some countries, GSM-1800 is also referred to as "Digital Cellular System" (DCS).

=== GSM-850 and GSM-1900 ===
GSM-1900 and GSM-850 are used in most of North, South and Central America (ITU-Region 2). In North America, GSM operates on the primary mobile communication bands 850 MHz and 1900 MHz. In Canada, GSM-1900 is the primary band used in urban areas with 850 as a backup, and GSM-850 being the primary rural band. In the United States, regulatory requirements determine which area can use which band.

The term Cellular is sometimes used to describe GSM services in the 850 MHz band, because the original analog cellular mobile communication system was allocated in this spectrum. Further GSM-850 is also sometimes called GSM-800 because this frequency range was known as the "800 MHz band" (for simplification) when it was first allocated for AMPS in the United States in 1983. In North America GSM-1900 is also referred to as Personal Communications Service (PCS) like any other cellular system operating on the "1900 MHz band".

=== Frequency mixing between GSM 900/1800 and GSM 850/1900 ===
Some countries in Central and South America have allocated spectrum in the 900 MHz and 1800 MHz bands for GSM in addition to the common GSM deployments at 850 MHz and 1900 MHz for ITU-Region 2 (Americas). The result therefore is a mixture of usage in the Americas that requires travelers to confirm that the devices they have are compatible with the bands of the network at their destination. Frequency compatibility problems can be avoided through the use of multi-band (tri-band or, especially, quad-band) device.

The following countries are mixing GSM 900/1800 and GSM 850/1900 bands:

Countries that mix GSM 900/1800 and GSM 850/1900 bands
Region	Country/Territory	GSM-850	GSM-1900	GSM-900	GSM-1800
Caribbean	Antigua and Barbuda	Yes	Yes	Yes	No
Caribbean	Aruba, Bonaire and Curacao	No	Yes	Yes	Yes
Caribbean	Barbados	Yes	Yes	Yes	Yes
Caribbean	British Virgin Islands	Yes	Yes	Yes	Yes
Caribbean	Cayman Islands	Yes	Yes	Yes	Yes
Caribbean	Dominica	Yes	Yes	Yes	Yes
Caribbean	Dominican Republic	Yes	Yes	Yes	Yes
Caribbean	Grenada	Yes	Yes	Yes	Yes
Caribbean	Haiti	Yes	No	Yes	Yes
Caribbean	Jamaica	Yes	Yes	Yes	No
Caribbean	Saint Kitts and Nevis	Yes	Yes	Yes	Yes
Caribbean	Saint Lucia	Yes	Yes	Yes	Yes
Caribbean	Saint Vincent and the Grenadines	Yes	Yes	Yes	Yes
Caribbean	Turks and Caicos Islands	Yes	Yes	Yes	Yes
Central America	Costa Rica	Yes	No	No	Yes
Central America	El Salvador	Yes	Yes	Yes	No
Central America	Guatemala	Yes	Yes	Yes	No
South America	Brazil	Yes	No	Yes	Yes
South America	Uruguay	Yes	Yes	Yes	Yes
South America	Venezuela	Yes	Yes	Yes	Yes

=== GSM-450 ===
Another less common GSM version is GSM-450. It uses the same band as, and can co-exist with, old analog NMT systems. NMT is a first generation (1G) mobile system which was primarily used in Nordic countries, Benelux, Alpine Countries, Eastern Europe and Russia prior to the introduction of GSM. The GSM Association claims one of its around 680 operator-members has a license to operate a GSM 450 network in Tanzania. However, currently all active public operators in Tanzania use GSM 900/1800 MHz. There are no publicly advertised handsets for GSM-450 available.

Very few NMT-450 networks remain in operation. Overall, where the 450 MHz NMT band has been licensed, the original analogue network has been closed, and sometimes replaced by CDMA. Some of the CDMA networks have since upgraded from CDMA to LTE (LTE band 31).

== Multi-band and multi-mode phones ==
Today, most telephones support multiple bands as used in different countries to facilitate roaming. These are typically referred to as multi-band phones. Dual-band phones can cover GSM networks in pairs such as 900 and 1800 MHz frequencies (Europe, Asia, Australia and Brazil) or 850 and 1900 (North America and Brazil). European tri-band phones typically cover the 900, 1800 and 1900 bands giving good coverage in Europe and allowing limited use in North America, while North American tri-band phones utilize 850, 1800 and 1900 for widespread North American service but limited worldwide use. A new addition has been the quad-band phone, also known as a World Phone, supporting at least all four major GSM bands, allowing for global use (excluding non-GSM countries such as Japan, South Korea and as well countries where 2G system was shut down to release frequencies and spectrum for LTE networks like Australia (since 2017), Singapore and Taiwan (since 2018).

There are also multi-mode phones which can operate on GSM as well as on other mobile phone systems using other technical standards or proprietary technologies. Often these phones use multiple frequency bands as well. For example, one version of the Nokia 6340i GAIT phone sold in North America can operate on GSM-1900, GSM-850 and legacy TDMA-1900, TDMA-800, and AMPS-800, making it both multi-mode and multi-band. As a more recent example the Apple iPhone 5 and iPhone 4S support quad-band GSM at 850/900/1800/1900 MHz, quad-band UMTS/HSDPA/HSUPA at 850/900/1900/2100 MHz, and dual-band CDMA EV-DO Rev. An at 800/1900 MHz, for a total of 'six' different frequencies (though at most four in a single mode). This allows the same handset to be sold for AT&T Mobility, Verizon, and Sprint in the U.S. as well as a broad range of GSM carriers worldwide such as Vodafone, Orange and T-Mobile (Excluding-US), many of whom offer official unlocking.

== See also ==
- 3GPP
- Cellular frequencies
- Global Positioning System
- Roaming
- UMTS frequency bands
- LTE frequency bands
- 5G NR frequency bands
- CDMA frequency bands
- 2008 United States wireless spectrum auction
