= Multi-band device =

Type of mobile phone

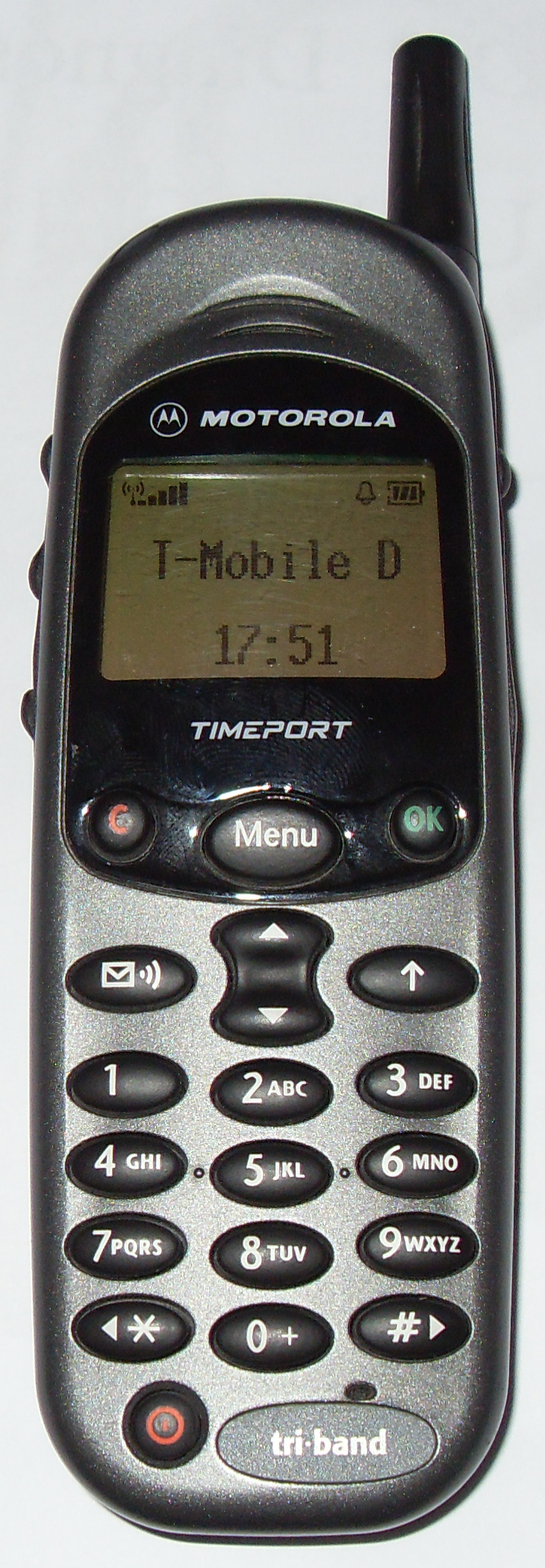
Motorola Timeport, the first tri-band mobile phone (1999)

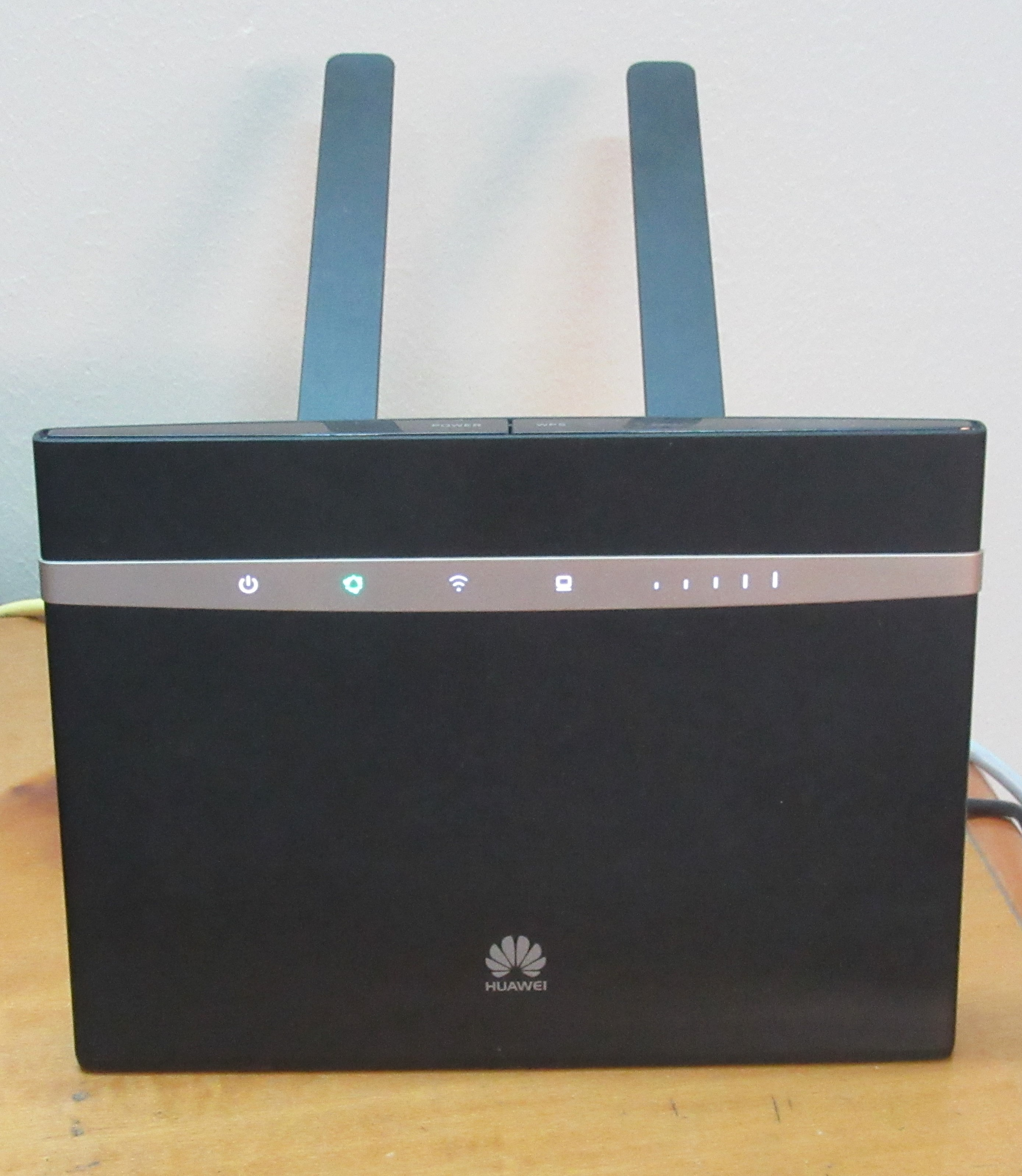
A dual band 4G+ router

In telecommunications, a multi-band device (including (2) dual-band, (3) tri-band, (4) quad-band and (5) penta-band devices) is a communication device (especially a mobile phone) that supports multiple radio frequency bands. All devices which have more than one channel use multiple frequencies; a band however is a group of frequencies containing many channels. Mobile carriers use multiple bands, internationally, to communicate with their telecommunications infrastructure. Multiple bands in mobile devices support roaming between different regions where different standards are used for mobile telephone services. Where the bands are widely separated in frequency, parallel transmit and receive signal path circuits must be provided, which may impact the manufacturing cost of multi-band devices due to increased circuit complexity.

The term quad-band describes a device that supports four frequency bands: the 850 and 1900 MHz bands, which are used in the Americas, and 900 / 1800, which are used in most other parts of the world. Most GSM/UMTS phones support all four bands, while most CDMA2000/1xRTT phones (mostly North America and voice transmission only) do not, and so are considered only dual-band devices. A few phones support both of the domestic frequencies but only one foreign one for limited roaming, making them tri-band phones.

The term penta-band describes a device that supports a fifth frequency band, commonly the 1700/2100 MHz band in much of the world. The Advanced Wireless Services (AWS) 1700 MHz band is also seeing increased usage.

== 4G LTE bands ==
In the United States alone, the two largest carriers are instead implementing 4G LTE in the 700 MHz band, which was reallocated from TV broadcasting during the DTV transition. TV stations were forced to move to lower UHF and even far worse VHF frequencies with poorer mobile TV and even regular terrestrial TV performance, because the 700 MHz band has better radio propagation characteristics that allow mobile phone signal to penetrate deeper into buildings with less attenuation than the 1700 MHz or 2100 MHz bands.

AT&T Mobility devices use former TV channel 53 and 54 nationwide and has purchased spectrum from former TV channel 55 nationwide (purchased from Qualcomm's defunct MediaFLO pay TV service), and also channel 56 in densely populated areas such as California and the Northeast Corridor. Verizon Wireless formerly held frequencies just above TV channel 51, which is still in use, causing adjacent-channel interference that is preventing the carrier from using them until the planned top-down spectrum repacking occurs. The channel 52 spectrum was later purchased by T-Mobile US who now uses this spectrum for their network. Verizon now uses higher blocks within the former TV band (channels 60 and 61).

== See also ==
- List of UMTS networks around the world, and the frequencies and data rates they support
- GSM frequency bands, as defined by the standards bodies
- UMTS frequency bands, as defined by the standards bodies
