= Spice MI-335 (Stellar Craze) =

Mass market smartphone

Spice Mi-355 Stellar Craze
- Manufacturer: Spice Digital
- Predecessor: Mi-350n
- Successor: Mi-435
- Operating system: Android v2.3 (Gingerbread) with Spice Gang
- CPU: Qualcomm MSM7227A 800 MHz processor Adreno 200 GPU
- Memory: 512mb RAM,512mb ROM
- Removable storage: Supports up to 32 GB microSD (No Card Included)
- Rear camera: 5 Megapixel fixed focus with dual-led flash including Secondary camera
- Display: 3.5 in (8.9 cm) TFT LCD HVGA 320 × 480 capacitive touchscreen
- Data inputs: Multi-touch with 3.5 inches screen

The Spice MI-335 or (Spice Mi-355 Stellar Craze) is a mass market smartphone developed by the S mobility Ltd.(Spice mobile Corporation), that was announced on 2012 August. It is powered by an 800 MHz Qualcomm Snapdragon s1 processor and runs the Android operating system, version v2.3 (Gingerbread), planned upgrade to v4.0 (Ice Cream Sandwich). It includes an TFT LCD capacitive touchscreen, a 5-megapixel camera and Dual SIM. It belong to a series of Spice Stellar Craze.

== Features ==
Spice mobile Corporation assured that Mi-355 comes with Android 2.3 which consists of a redesigned search framework, improved power management rich multimedia, faster, more intuitive text input, and enhanced graphics. Mi-355 is powered by Qualcomm Snapdragon 800 MHz S1 Processor which can handle multitasking and load applications. It is having 5 MP camera with Flash at rear and VGA at the front.

== See also ==
- Spice Stellar Mobile Series
- Spice Digital
- Spice Telecom
- Spice Stellar Nhance Mi-435
