= Sony Ericsson Xperia X10 =

High-end smartphone by Sony Ericsson

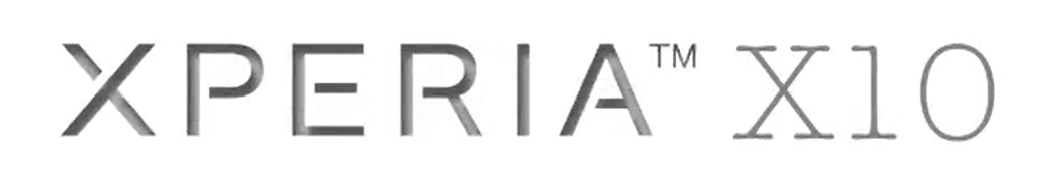

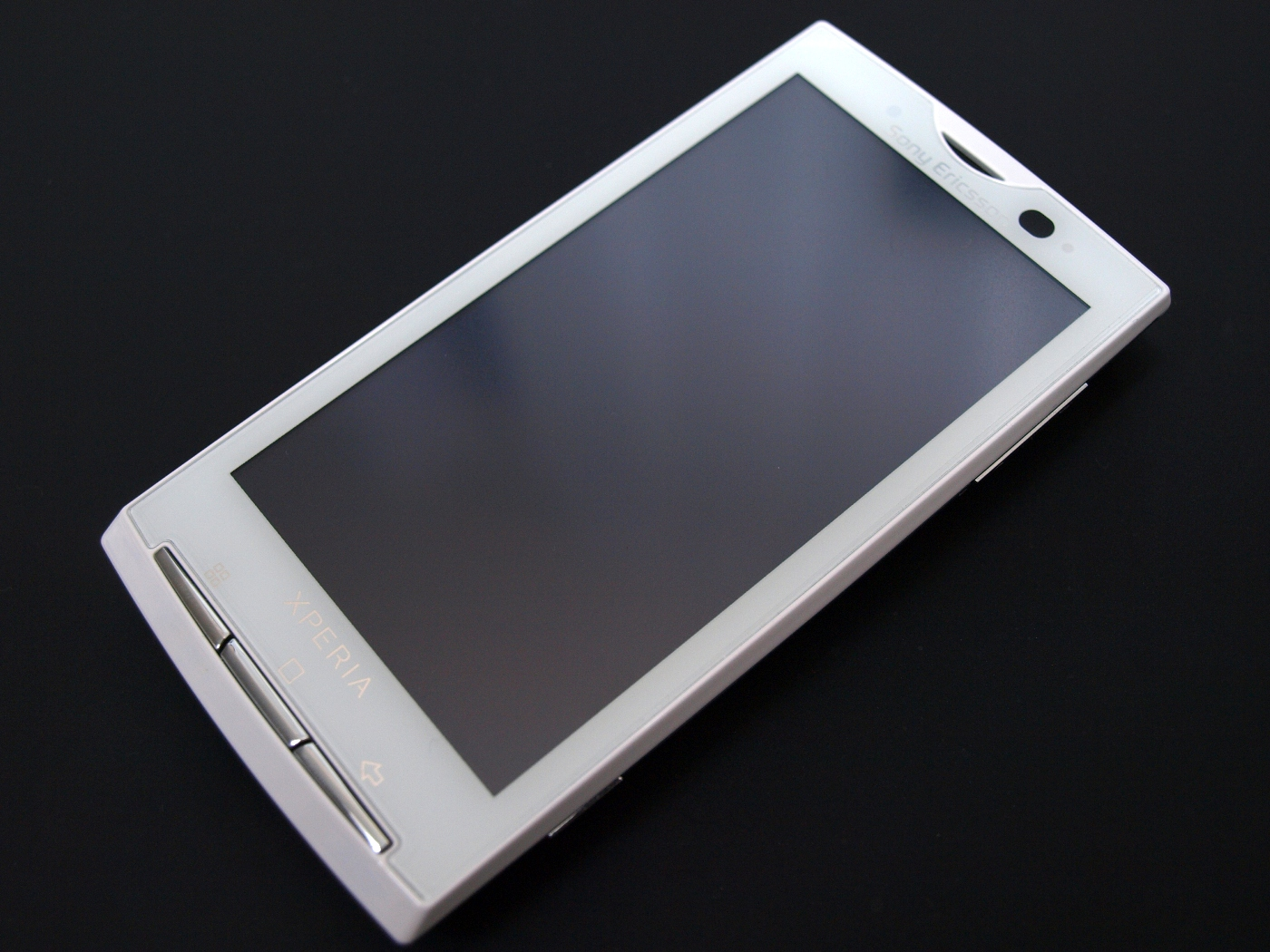
- Developer: Sony Ericsson
- Manufacturer: Sony Ericsson
- Type: Smartphone
- Series: Sony Ericsson Xperia
- First released: March 22, 2010; 16 years ago
- Availability by region: 22 March 2010 (U.K.); 29 March 2010 (India); 1 April 2010 (Japan & Mexico); 2 April 2010 (European Union & Russian Federation); 10 April 2010 (Brazil & Chile); 15 April 2010 (Canada); 24 June 2010 (South Korea); 15 August 2010 (U.S.)
- Predecessor: Sony Ericsson Xperia X2
- Successor: Sony Ericsson Xperia arc
- Related: Sony Ericsson Xperia X10 Mini
- Form factor: Slate smartphone (Black or White)
- Dimensions: 119×63×13 mm (4.69×2.48×0.51 in)
- Weight: 135 g (5 oz) with battery
- Operating system: Upgraded to Android 2.3.3 in end of July 2011 Android 2.1 (upgraded from Android 1.6)
- CPU: 1 GHz Qualcomm Snapdragon QSD8250
- Memory: 384 MB
- Storage: 1 GB NAND Flash in phone, up to 32 GB on microSDHC memory card
- Removable storage: microSDHC (up to 32 GB supported)
- SIM: miniSIM
- Battery: Rechargeable and replaceable, Li-Po 1500 mAh (BST-41).
- Rear camera: 8.1 MP with Auto focus, Face recognition, Geo-tagging, Image and video stabilizer, Smile detection and Touch focus, Video WVGA (Android 1.6), 720p HD (Android 2.1)
- Front camera: None
- Display: 4.0-inch touch screen, Hardware 16M Colors, 65,356-colour. (480 x 854 pixels) (245 dpi, 0.39 Megapixels) FWVGA TFT
- Connectivity: Bluetooth 2.0 with A2DP microUSB 2.0; 3.5 mm audio jack aGPS; Wi-Fi 802.11 b/g
- Data inputs: Touchscreen (limited multi-touch), Accelerometer, Digital Compass, Proximity and ambient light sensors, Headset controls
- Codename: Rachael

The Sony Ericsson Xperia X10 is a 2010 high end smartphone in the Xperia series produced by Sony Ericsson. It was the first Sony Ericsson smartphone to run the Android operating system, and was designed to be the successor of the Xperia X2. The phone was shipped with Android 1.6 (Donut), but an upgrade to 2.1 (Eclair) was made available starting 31 October 2010, with a gradual international rollout. Originally, Sony Ericsson stated that the X10 would not receive an upgrade to Android 2.2 (Froyo) or beyond, but the phone was later upgraded to 2.3.3 (Gingerbread) with the updates starting on 29 July 2011.

The phone features an 8.1 MP camera and a 1 GHz Qualcomm Snapdragon CPU. Its screen has a widescreen resolution, 480 x 854 pixels, and features a virtual keyboard rather than a physical one. It makes use of HSPA (3G+) for its mobile connection, giving it top download speeds of 7.2 Mbit/s. The UX platform features two applications which allow the user to consolidate all of their communications and media, Timescape and Mediascape, respectively.

== Reception ==
The Xperia X10 was first revealed on 3 November 2009. It was first released in Japan on 1 April 2010, and has since become the quickest-selling smartphone for NTT DoCoMo. The overall response has been positive for the hardware, camera and screen. There were negative comments about the lack of support for Android 2.1 which were quelled when it was released later that year.

== Hardware ==
The display is a wide TFT Capacitive touchscreen, with a 16:9 aspect ratio and FWVGA resolution of 480 x 854 pixels, along with a multi-touch enabled screen, the first from Sony. The 8.1-megapixel camera features 16x digital zoom, image stabilization, auto-focus, geo-tagging, smile detection, and face detection. It can also record video, with an LED for use in poor light conditions. It has a 3-axis accelerometer and built in GPS. Its CPU is 1 GHz Qualcomm Snapdragon QSD8250 and its GPU is Adreno 200 (AMD Z430).

The hardware is limited in its multi-touch functionality. It can only track multiple touches where their X and Y coordinates are different. The firmware to enable this functionality was first released in Japan.

=== Networks ===
The Xperia X10 uses the 850/900/1800/1900 frequency bands for GSM. Both versions use 850/900/1800/1900 frequency bands for GSM while they differ regarding the UMTS frequency bands; the X10a uses 800/850/1900/2100 bands, and the X10i uses 900/1700/2100. The X10a is used by AT&T Mobility in the US, Telstra in Australia, and Rogers Wireless in Canada. It is also used in South America. The X10i is used by T-Mobile in the USA; Wind Mobile and Mobilicity in Canada; Optus and VHA (under both the Vodafone and 3 brands) in Australia; Singtel, Starhub and M1 in Singapore; and through the rest of Asia, Europe, and Oceania. In Japan, it is called the SO-01B and sold by NTT Docomo, using the X10a configuration.

=== Bluetooth and Wi-Fi ===
The X10 has built in Wi-Fi b/g and Bluetooth 2.1, with the option to tether other devices. With the Android 2.3 update, the phone can also create a Wi-Fi hotspot.

== Software ==
Sony Ericsson has its own Android overlay called UX, short for User eXperience. It consists of design elements, themes and custom applications. The main applications are Sony Ericsson Timescape and Sony Ericsson Mediascape. Timescape is a program that brings together Facebook, Twitter, SMS, and email into a column on the home screen. Mediascape is a player and library application for media files. It can also connect to Facebook and Picasa accounts and to the phone's contacts list. This makes it possible to attach photos users have taken with the camera to their contacts or send them directly to their Facebook account.

=== Updates ===
The Xperia X10 was released with Android 1.6, with an upgrade to Android 2.1 released on 31 October 2010.

On 20 January 2011, an update was released which enabled multi-touch.

On 1 February, Sony Ericsson announced a future update for Xperia X10 that would bring optimizations and bug fixes along with language additions and the pinch-to-zoom feature.

On 29 July 2011, the Android 2.3.3 update was released.

=== Rooting ===
As of 1 April 2011, the bootloader has been bypassed via kexec which enables the loading of custom kernels. Custom ROMs have been developed, however they still use the 2.1 kernel so some features such as native Wi-Fi tethering are missing. As of 20 January 2011 there are two custom roms being developed based on 2.2 (both of which have working camera drivers). All X10 devices running the Gingerbread firmware (2.3.x) are vulnerable to the zergRush rooting method.

=== Issues ===
The initial 3UK (and possibly other Mobile Operators) release of firmware contained bugs. Some users have reported Wi-Fi connection disruptions in early software versions.

Several users from sonyericsson, and 4pda forums reported a self-rebooting bug on their X10i's. It is believed the bug appears because of defects on the phone's motherboard.

Since the Android 2.3 (Gingerbread) update the phone has suffered a stuttering in play or streaming of music regardless of file association. The only solution currently is to root the phone and apply a patch located on the XDA developers forum. Sony refuses to acknowledge the problem and have as of late offered no solution to this bug.

== Xperia Series ==
Sony Ericsson announced two mini versions of the Xperia X10 at the Mobile World Congress 2010. The X10 Mini and the X10 Mini Pro were released in June 2010.

== See also ==
- Galaxy Nexus
- List of Android smartphones
- List of Xperia devices

Preceded by Sony Ericsson Xperia X2	Sony Ericsson Xperia X10; 2010	Succeeded by Sony Ericsson Xperia Arc
