= Sony Ericsson Xperia X1 =

Smartphone model

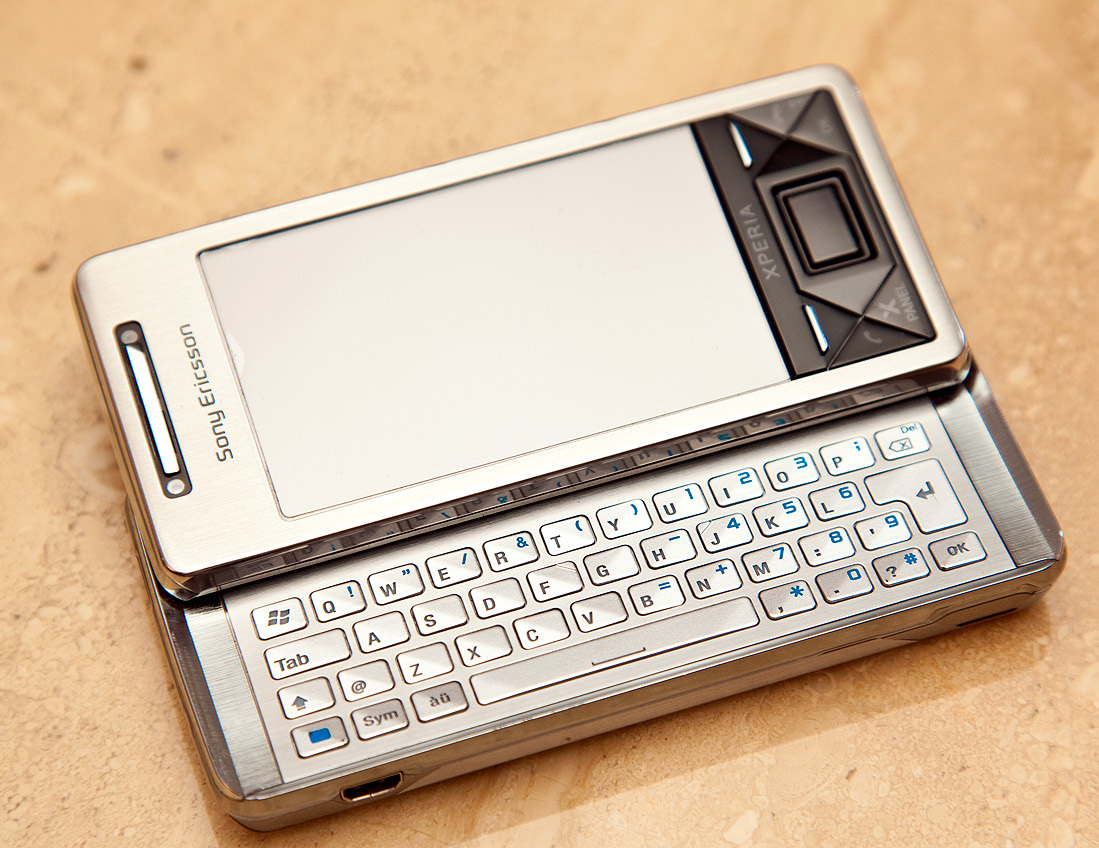
- Developer: Sony Ericsson
- Manufacturer: HTC
- Type: Smartphone
- Series: Sony Ericsson Xperia
- Availability by region: October 2008
- Predecessor: Sony Ericsson P1
- Successor: Sony Ericsson Xperia X2
- Related: HTC Touch Pro
- Compatible networks: Quad-band GSM/GPRS Class 10 (4+1/3+2 slots), 32 – 48 kbit/s/EDGE: 850/900/1800/1900 MHz; Tri-band UMTS/HSDPA/HSUPA: X1a: 850/1900/2100 MHz ( (Australia) / (United States) )/ (Argentina); X1i/X1c: 900/1900/2100 MHz (Australia) / (European Union) / (Brazil) / (China) / (Chile)
- Form factor: vertical arc-slider design
- Dimensions: 110×53×16.7 mm (4.33×2.09×0.66 in)
- Weight: 146 g (5 oz)
- Operating system: Windows Mobile 6.1 Professional
- CPU: ARM 11 Qualcomm MSM7200A 528 MHz with 256-MHz ARM9 2nd core, hardware 3D graphics support with up to 4 million 3D triangles per second, and 133 million 3D textured pixels per second fill rate, OpenGL ES-compliant 3D graphics
- Memory: 256 MB
- Storage: 512 MB NAND Flash
- Removable storage: microSDHC 16 GB
- SIM: miniSIM
- Battery: Standard battery, Li-Po 1500 mAh (BST-41)
- Charging: Micro-B charging
- Rear camera: 3.2-MP (2048×1536) with flash Video: X1i/X1c: MPEG-4/H.263 30 fps at VGA, H.264: 15 fps at VGA; X1a: MPEG4/H.263 24 fps at QVGA, no H.264
- Front camera: Secondary QCIF (176 × 144) format front-facing video telephony camera
- Display: 3.0-inch 16-bit color WVGA (800×480) TFT touchscreen, ATI 3D chip
- Connectivity: Bluetooth 2.0 with A2DP miniUSB 2.0; 3.5mm audio jack aGPS; Wi-Fi 802.11 b/g no IR
- Data inputs: Touchscreen; Handwriting recognition Stylus; Keyboard: 4-row QWERTY ( (United Kingdom) / (United States) ) QWERTZ ( (Germany) ) AZERTY ( (France) ) Optical joystick

The Xperia X1 (codenamed HTC Kovsky) is a high-end smartphone from Sony Ericsson, and is the first in the manufacturer's Xperia series. The phone was designed and built by Taiwanese OEM HTC. The X1 was first presented at the 2008 Mobile World Congress. The X1 is an arc-slider phone with the Windows Mobile 6.1 operating system. It is Sony Ericsson's first product to run on Windows Mobile. The device also has a Java virtual machine (JBed) and supports Java Platform, Micro Edition that is claimed to have a richer set of features than typically available.

== Features ==
The phone features a three-inch resistive touchscreen overlaying a keypad which emerges when the user slides the touchscreen face upward, much as in the HTC TyTN II, although the X1's touchscreen slides out in an arc. Its touchscreen is a 65,536-color TFT WVGA display. It has a 3.2-megapixel digital camera which records video at thirty frames per second in VGA (640×480) quality. Reviews highlighted camera performance as mediocre and disappointing. There is also a secondary front-facing camera for videoconferencing that is of QCIF format.

Connectivity options for the phone include: mini-USB; wireless LAN 802.11b/g; Bluetooth 2.0 with A2DP, FTP, and HID; EDGE; and quad-band GSM, UMTS, HSDPA, HSUPA, and HSCSD. The X1 has 512 MB of internal memory (400 MB free), which is expandable to 16 gigabytes using high capacity microSD cards, currently cards up to 32 gigabytes have been released by SanDisk. The phone also features A-GPS for navigation.

The X1 ships with Opera Mobile pre-installed.

Standard features on the X1 include push email, an RSS feed aggregator, and handwriting recognition.

It is also able to use the GSM network feature Alternate line service.

The device is powered by Qualcomm's ARM 11 MSM7200A CPU, which runs at 528 MHz. The device's memory is 256 MB RAM.

=== Panel interface ===
The home screen on the Xperia X1 supports up to nine different "panels" which can be switched between by the user, each offering different functionality. This allows users to select exactly which functionality they want on their homescreen, and switch easily. Extra panels can be downloaded from Sony Ericsson or third parties. Sony Ericsson released an SDK for developers which allows panels to be created using either C++ or HTML with Microsoft Visual Studio 2005 SP1 or better. There is also a third party website which simplifies the process of creating an HTML panel, as it is quite a complex task with Visual Studio.

== Release date ==
The X1 began shipping on 30 September 2008. It became available to the UK market on 27 October 2008 (only on Vodafone). The handset is available through the Carphone Warehouse and Phones4U in the UK. In Europe it will be sold only in Fnac stores (Belgium and France).

In Hong Kong, X1 was shipped on 29 October 2008. The first batch of X1 in Hong Kong was dedicated for the mobile operator Three HK and was reserved for the operator's VIP premium user for pre-ordering.

In South Africa, it was released to the public on 16 December 2009.

On 13 November, Sony Ericsson announced that the phone would be available in North America on 28 November 2008 for $799 unlocked.

In Australia, the X1a was released on Telstra in December 2008 and went on sale 26 December 2008. It is now also available on the Vodafone and 3 Networks.

The Sony Ericsson Canadian website reveals the X1a as "coming soon", available within three months. The availability status was spotted as early as 14 February 2010.

== Publicity ==
The launch of the Xperia X1 was accompanied by a video called "Who is Johnny X?".

The launch was tied in closely with the "London Design Festival".

== Specifications ==
=== Display ===
- 3" resistive touchscreen with a resolution of 800×480 pixels (WVGA)
- 65 thousand color TFT display

=== Device colors ===
The phone is available in two colors

- Solid Black
- Steel Silver

=== Physical attributes ===
Dimensions: 110.0 × 53.0 × 16.7 millimeters; 4.33 × 2.09 × 0.66 inches
Weight with battery: 158.0 grams; 5.57 ounces

=== Battery ===
Lithium-Polymer, 1500 mAh.

Talk time:
GSM: 10h
WCDMA: 6h
WCDMA video call: 3h

Stand by:
GSM: 20.8 days
WCDMA: 20.7 days

=== Connectivity ===
The Xperia X1 supports an always-on 3G broadband Internet connection with high-speed data transfer. This enables audio and video streaming, web surfing, multimedia messaging and email.

Connectivity options include:

- 3.5G broadband
- HSDPA with download transfer rate up to 7.2 Mbit/s
- HSUPA with upload transfer rate up to 2.0 Mbit/s
- Wi-Fi
- Bluetooth, with a range of 10 meters
- GPRS modem for dial-up Internet
- Synchronization and content sharing with PCs
- USB mass storage
- USB cable support

=== Software features ===
Windows Mobile operating system

- Microsoft Outlook Mobile: email, contacts, calendar, tasks
- Microsoft Office Mobile: Word, Excel, PowerPoint
- Opera Mobile
- Windows Media Player Mobile
- Windows Live
- Exchange ActiveSync
- Voice control
- Utility Applications: file explorer, calculator, pictures & video, notes

The XDAndroid project makes it possible to run Android on some Windows Mobile phones, including the Xperia X1. Additionally, the Rhobuntu project makes it possible to run Ubuntu Linux on some Windows Mobile phones, including the Xperia X1.

==== Storage ====
Internal memory: up to 400 MB

microSD memory card support up to 16 GB

=== Networks ===
- Quad-band GSM / GPRS / EDGE: GSM 850 / 900 / 1800 / 1900
- Tri-band UMTS / HSDPA / HSUPA: UMTS 850 / 1900 / 2100 X1a, UMTS 900 / 1900 / 2100 X1i/X1c
- SAR value: 0.57 W/kg

== See also ==
- Technological convergence

Preceded by New series	Sony Ericsson Xperia X1; 2008	Succeeded by Sony Ericsson Xperia X2
