= Spice Stellar Nhance Mi-435 =

Smartphone model

Spice Stellar nhance Mi-435
- Manufacturer: Spice Digital
- Predecessor: Mi-335
- Successor: Mi-1010
- Operating system: Android v4.0 (Ice Cream Sandwich) with Spice Gang
- CPU: Qualcomm Snapdragon MSM8225 chipset 1 GHz processor
- GPU: Adreno 203 GPU
- Memory: 512 MB RAM(341 MB Available, 85 MB use in system core files), 4 GB ROM(2 GB User Available)
- Removable storage: Supports up to 32 GB Class 10 microSD (No Card Included)
- Rear camera: 8-megapixel fixed-focus with LED flash including secondary camera
- Display: 4.0 in (10 cm) TFT LCD WVGA 480 × 800 capacitive touchscreen
- Data inputs: 4.0 inches screen

Spice Stellar Nhance Mi-435 was announced in 2013 by Spice mobile Corporation. It is a dual-SIM phone with 4-inch capacitive touch display, which runs on Android Ice Cream Sandwich platform. It has 1 GHz dual-core processor and is backed with 512 MB RAM. The phone boasts an 8-megapixel main camera with fixed-focus uses CMOS sensor, 5x digital zoom, and video recording features and 1.3-megapixel front camera for video chat. On connectivity front, it has GPRS, 3G, Bluetooth, Wi-Fi, and micro USB.

== Features ==
Spice mobile Corporation assured that Mi-435 comes with Android v4.0.4 latest version of Ice Cream Sandwich. Mi-435 is powered by Qualcomm Snapdragon 1 GHz S4 Processor it uses Snapdragon MSM8225 chipset which can handle multitasking and load applications According to Spice it has in-built audio-video player and decoder capable of offering 1080p HD video play. It comes with features like GPS/AGPS for location tracking, and Push Mail for smarter mail sync that conserves battery life, the Spice Stellar Nhance can be enhanced is secured with a 6-month subscription to NQ Mobile Security. It has an 8 MP camera with flash at rear and 1.3 MP camera at the front. The maximum value of SAR in this handset is 0.694Watt/kg.

== Others ==
Spice Stellar Nhance Mi-435 has scored 6230 score in Antutu benchmark, 2700 in quadrant benchmark, which is a good score in its range.

== Rooting and custom Rom ==
- For rooting and flashing cmw.
- TreamBrust Rom is only custom rom available for mi435.

== See also ==
- Spice Stellar Mobile Series
- Spice Digital
- Spice Telecom
- Spice MI-335 (Stellar Craze)
