= Sony Ericsson Xperia X2 =

Cell phone model

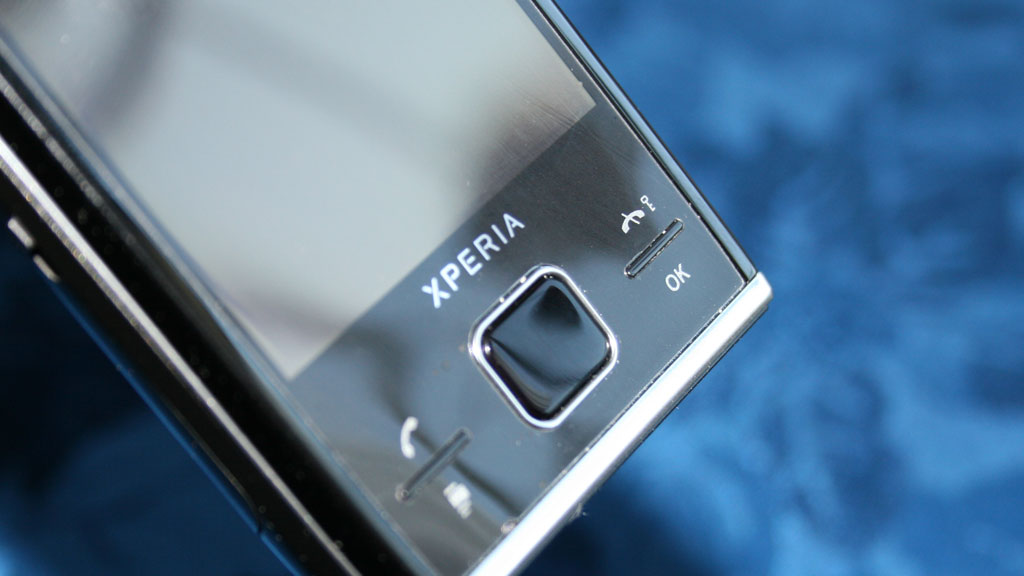
- Manufacturer: Sony Ericsson
- Series: Sony Ericsson Xperia
- Availability by region: October 2009
- Predecessor: Sony Ericsson Xperia X1
- Successor: Sony Ericsson Xperia X10
- Related: HTC Touch Pro2
- Form factor: Vertical arc-slider design
- Dimensions: 110×54×16 mm (4.33×2.13×0.63 in)
- Weight: 155 g (5 oz)
- Operating system: Windows Mobile 6.5 Professional
- System-on-chip: Qualcomm MSM7200A
- CPU: 528 MHz ARM11, Adreno 130 GPU
- Memory: 256 MB RAM, 512 MB ROM
- Storage: 512 MB ROM, 110 MB user-available
- Removable storage: MicroSDHC (hot-swap)
- Battery: Standard battery, Li-Po 1500 mAh (BST-41)
- Rear camera: 8 MP, WVGA @ 30 FPS, Front-facing VGA camer
- Front camera: None
- Display: 3.2-inch 16-bit color WVGA (800×480) TFT touchscreen (292 ppi)
- Connectivity: Bluetooth 2.1 + A2DP miniUSB 2.0; 3.5mm audio jack aGPS; Wi-Fi 802.11 b/g
- Data inputs: Touchscreen; Handwriting recognition Stylus; Full 4-row Keyboard

The Xperia X2 (internal codename Vulcan), announced in September 2009, is a smartphone of the Xperia series by Sony Ericsson. It is the successor to the X1. Features include a 3.2-inch touchscreen, a sliding arc keyboard, an 8.1 MP camera, Wi-Fi, GPS, and 3G, among others. It runs Windows Mobile 6.5 and the home screen can be customised to the normal Windows Mobile 6.5 home screen, Xperia panels, or an isometric pixel art city. Compared to its predecessor, the X1, improvements include a larger touch screen, Windows Mobile 6.5, and an improved camera.

The Xperia X2 is the last Sony Ericsson phone to use the Windows Mobile operating system. The successor to the Xperia X2 is the Xperia X10, which runs on Android.

Vodafone cancelled plans to exclusively offer the phone.

== History ==
A prototype was first spotted in June 2009. In September of that year, Sony Ericsson gave a demo of the device to press, announcing a launch in late 2009. However the launch was delayed until January 2010.

In April 2010, Sony Ericsson launched its first upgrade (MR1). It upgraded Windows Mobile from 6.5.1 to 6.5.2, which improved both the stability and usability of the device, it brought in the use of video telephony, and an FM radio and it introduced fast GPS to get a quicker fix. As well as all this, MR1 upgraded many of the applications in the phone to improve speed and usability and fix any bugs.

The second update MR2 went live in May and Windows Mobile was updated to 6.5.3. This was a significant upgrade in terms of usability, performance, power management, and the browser experience. Despite that MR2 was undoubtedly a move in the right direction, most of the users who send their feedback on the official Sony Ericsson product blog, developer forums and Sony Ericsson fan sites continue to complain that even after MR2 device is still unstable and lacks some key features such as support for Bluetooth remote SIM access (rSAP) profile which make X2 unable to pair with any modern premium car kits which are built into Mercedes, BMW, Audi, Skoda etc. – an essential feature for business users and executives who were intended to be the main target customers for the handset. After the MR2 upgrade, Sony Ericsson ceased development for the phone. This decision from the Sony Ericsson management was an unfortunate move, because the phone still contained multiple bugs that made life difficult for its users. The phone still contains a serious bug that corrupts the SD-card's content, and makes it an unreliable tool for business-users. Many users confirmed this bug, and one user on the Xda-forum figured out the cause to this bug. Due to the dropped support from Sony Ericsson, a fix to the data-loss bug was introduced on the forum.

== Images ==
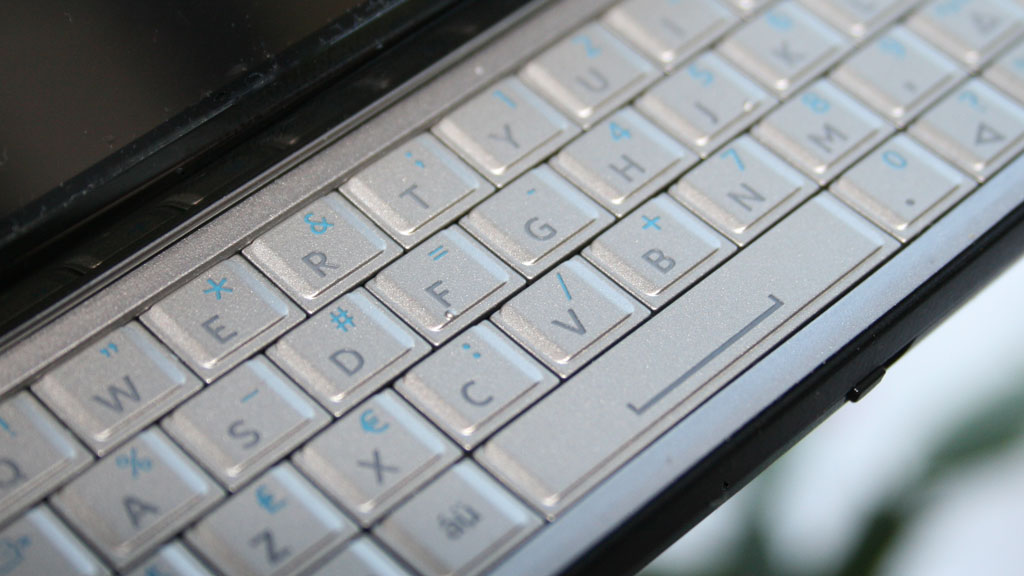
Xperia X2 keyboard

Preceded by Sony Ericsson Xperia X1	Sony Ericsson Xperia X2; 2010	Succeeded by Sony Ericsson Xperia X10
