= Hyundai MB 490i =

Hyundai MB-490i Dolphin
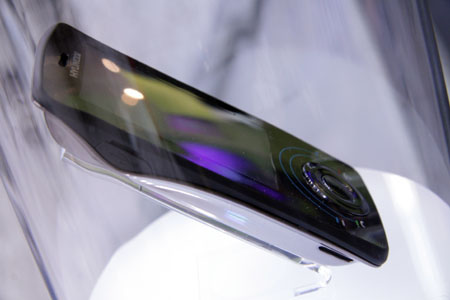
- Manufacturer: Hyundai Mobile
- Compatible networks: GSM 900/1800/1900, GPRS, EDGE
- Form factor: Touchscreen
- Memory: microSD
- Rear camera: 2MP
- Display: 400 × 240 WQVGA
- Connectivity: Bluetooth 2.0
- Data inputs: Touchscreen

The MB-490i is a tri-band/3G touchscreen phone made by Korean manufacturer Hyundai Mobile. It was first publicly shown at Mobile World Congress 2009.

Its design and styling is shaped to resemble a dolphin’s head while other elements include rippling water around the camera. The dolphin theme is also carried through into software, with a dolphin assistant to help navigate menus.

The MB-490i was Hyundai’s first attempt to push the styling and functionality of its devices into the midrange dominated by the likes of Nokia, Samsung, LG and Sony Ericsson.

It has a 400 × 240 pixel WQVGA touchscreen and is designed for multimedia playback. In particular, its audio components including speakers come from Yamaha. Other elements include an FM radio, audio and movie player and a 2MP camera.
