= IBM T220/T221 LCD monitors =

High resolution LCD monitors

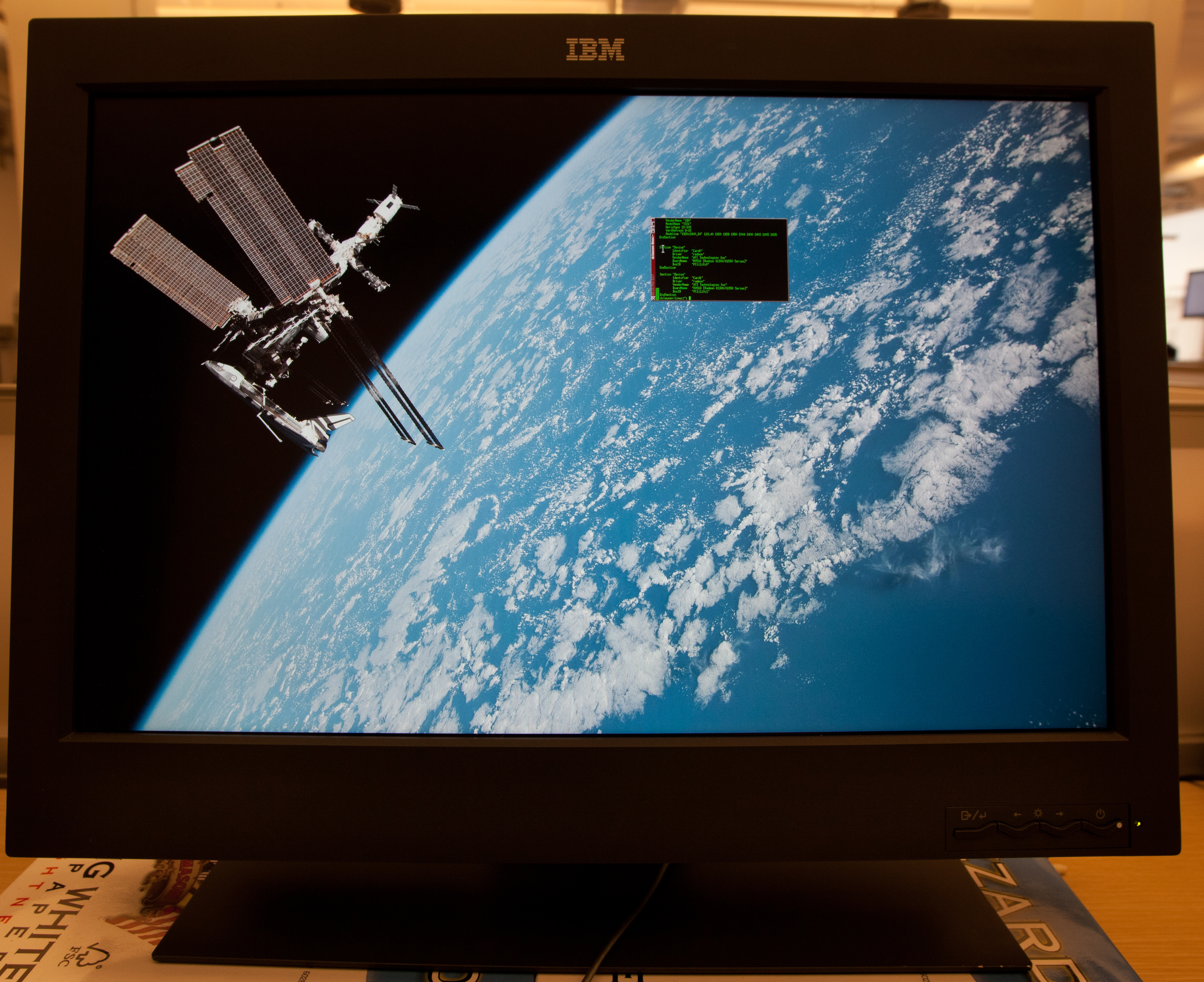
An IBM T221 monitor with a full 80x24 xterm window with the normal 6x13 "fixed" font

The T220 and T221 are LCD monitors by IBM that were sold between 2001 and 2005, with a native resolution of 3840×2400 pixels (WQUXGA) on a screen with a diagonal of 22.2 inches (564 mm). This works out to 9,216,000 pixels, with a pixel density of 204 pixels per inch (80 dpcm, 0.1245 mm pixel pitch), much higher than contemporary computer monitors (about 100 pixels per inch) and approaching the resolution of print media. The display family was nicknamed "Big Bertha" in some trade journals. Costing around US$8,400 in 2003 (equivalent to $15,300 in 2026), the displays saw few buyers. Such high-resolution displays remained niche products for nearly a decade until modern high-dpi displays such as Apple's Retina display line saw more-widespread adoption.

== IBM T220 (9503-DG0) ==
The IBM T220 was introduced in June 2001 and was the first monitor to natively support a resolution of 3840×2400. In order to support such a high resolution, it features an unusual connector arrangement. On the rear of the display are two LFH-60 connectors. A pair of cables supplied with the monitor attaches to the connectors and splits into two single-link DVI connectors each, for a total of four DVI channels. One, two or four of the connectors may be used at once.

IBM T220 came with a Matrox G200 MMS PCI-32 video card and two power supplies. To achieve native resolution the screen is sectioned into four columns of 960×2400 pixels or four tiles of 1920x1200 pixels. The monitor's native refresh rate is 41 Hz.

== IBM T221 ==
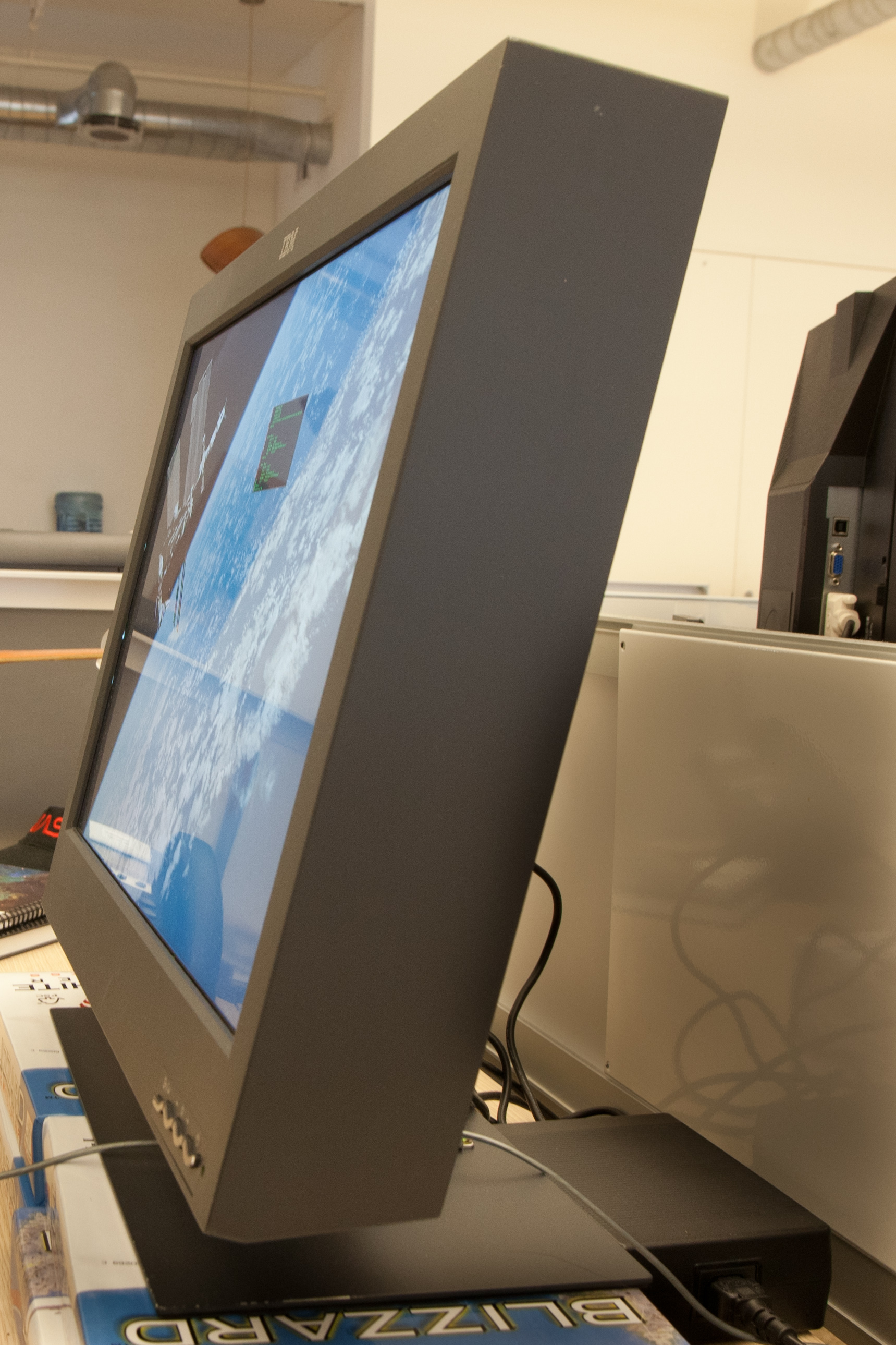
Side view of the IBM T221

This is a revised model of the original T220. Notable improvements include using only one power adapter instead of two and support for more screen modes. However, power consumption increased from 111 to 135 watts (111 to 150 at maximum.) They were initially available as 9503-DG1 and 9503-DG3 models. The 9503-DG1 model came with a Matrox G200 MMS graphics card and two LFH-60 connector cables. The 9503-DG3 model came with one cable connecting from one or two DVI ports on the graphics card to the T221's LFH-60 sockets.

The 9503-DG1 model T221 originally ran at maximum resolution in four 960×2400 stripes. Later firmware permitted a 1920×1200 tile mode as well.

The supported maximum refresh rates, at native resolution, depend on how many TMDS links are used. Single, double, and quad-link support 13, 25, 41 Hz refresh rates, respectively. With reduced blanking periods, the single, double, and quad-TMDS-link can obtain 17.1, 33.72, and 41 Hz refresh. This model's internal refresh rate is always 41 Hz. The T221 9503-DG5/DGP(glossy)/DGM(matte) model was the final version, introduced in September 2003.

The 9503-DG5/DGP/DGM model had a native refresh rate of 48 Hz and did not come with a graphics card but included an external converter box that receives a dual-link DVI signal, re-synchronizes, buffers, and splits it into two single-link signals - one carrying odd pixels plus sync, and the other even pixels plus sync. A third party connector adapter, previously available in Japan, buffers and splits only the TMDS sync signal. Internal dual-link retrofits included an unbuffered hardwire jumper-split of the TMDS sync signal which resulted in impedance mismatch, and an unbuffered hardwire split of the TMDS sync signal with a 24 Ohm series resistor on each leg. Using just one dual-link DVI interface through a converter box allows a refresh rate of 24 Hz or 25 Hz. When the converter box is used in parallel with a third single-link DVI input, a refresh rate of 48 Hz can be achieved. In this mode the dual-link DVI drives the left 2624×2400 portion of the screen and the single-link DVI drives the remaining 1216×2400 portion. Alternatively, two converter boxes can be used simultaneously with two dual-link DVI ports to drive the DG5 as two 1920×2400 stripes at 48 Hz. For legacy AGP video cards with only three TMDS channels (such as most cards based on NVIDIA Quadro FX 3000 or NVIDIA GeForce 6) the converter box is needed to get the maximum refresh rate.

With four TMDS links, the monitor can be driven at maximum refresh rate at any resolution using four 1920×1200 tiles. The converter box does not work with earlier revisions of the monitor. Driving the monitor with four DVI cables requires a sufficiently powerful graphics card, for example the Matrox Parhelia HR256 legacy PCI-X card. The uncommon resolution, connection and screen splitting may require custom settings for systems not officially supported.

The Viewsonic VP2290b-3 is a rebadged version of this monitor. The IBM T221-DG5 was discontinued in June 2005.

== History ==
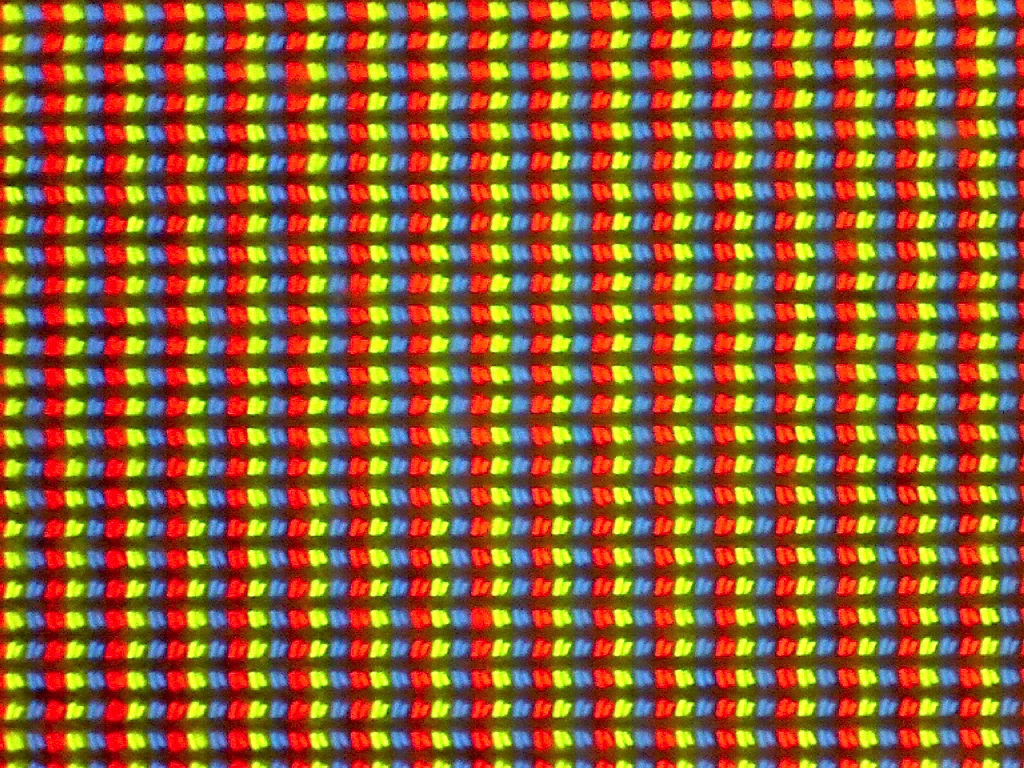
200× microscopy image of the dual domain IPS panel in an IBM T221

IBM T221 started out as an experimental technology from the flat panel display group at IBM Thomas J. Watson Research Center. In 2000, a prototype 22.2 in TFTLCD, code-named "Bertha", was made in a joint effort between IBM Research and IBM Japan. This display had a pixel format of 3840×2400 (QUXGA-W) with 204 ppi. On 10 November 2000, IBM announced the shipment of the prototype monitors to U.S. Department of Energy's Lawrence Livermore National Laboratory in California. Later on 27 June 2001, IBM announced the production version of the monitor, known as T220. Later in November 2001, IBM announced its replacement, IBM T221. On 19 March 2002, IBM announced lowering the price of IBM T221 from US$17,999 to US$8,399. Later on 2 September 2003, IBM announced the availability of the 9503-DG5 model.

IBM and Chi Mei Group of Taiwan formed a joint venture called IDTech in 2001 to manufacture the T221 in Japan. ViewSonic and iiyama OEMed the T221 and sold it under their brand names. Both matte and glossy versions were produced by IDTech. The production line of IDTech at Yasu Technologies was sold to Sony in 2005 and the fate of the T221 is unclear. The monitor is no longer on sale. As of 2023, five manufacturers produce WQUXGA panels ranging in size from 13.4 in. to 16 in.

== Rebadged models ==
Brand	Model(s)	Base IBM model
Iiyama	AQU5611D BK, AQU5611DT BK	9503-DG3
ViewSonic	VP2290b, VP2290b-2	9503-DG3
ViewSonic	VP2290b-3	9503-DG5
IDTech OEM Panel	MD22292B2/C2	9503-DG1/DG3
IDTech OEM Panel	MD22292B5	9503-DG5/DGP/DGM

== See also ==
- 4K UHDTV
