= Sony Ericsson Xperia X8 =

Android smartphone

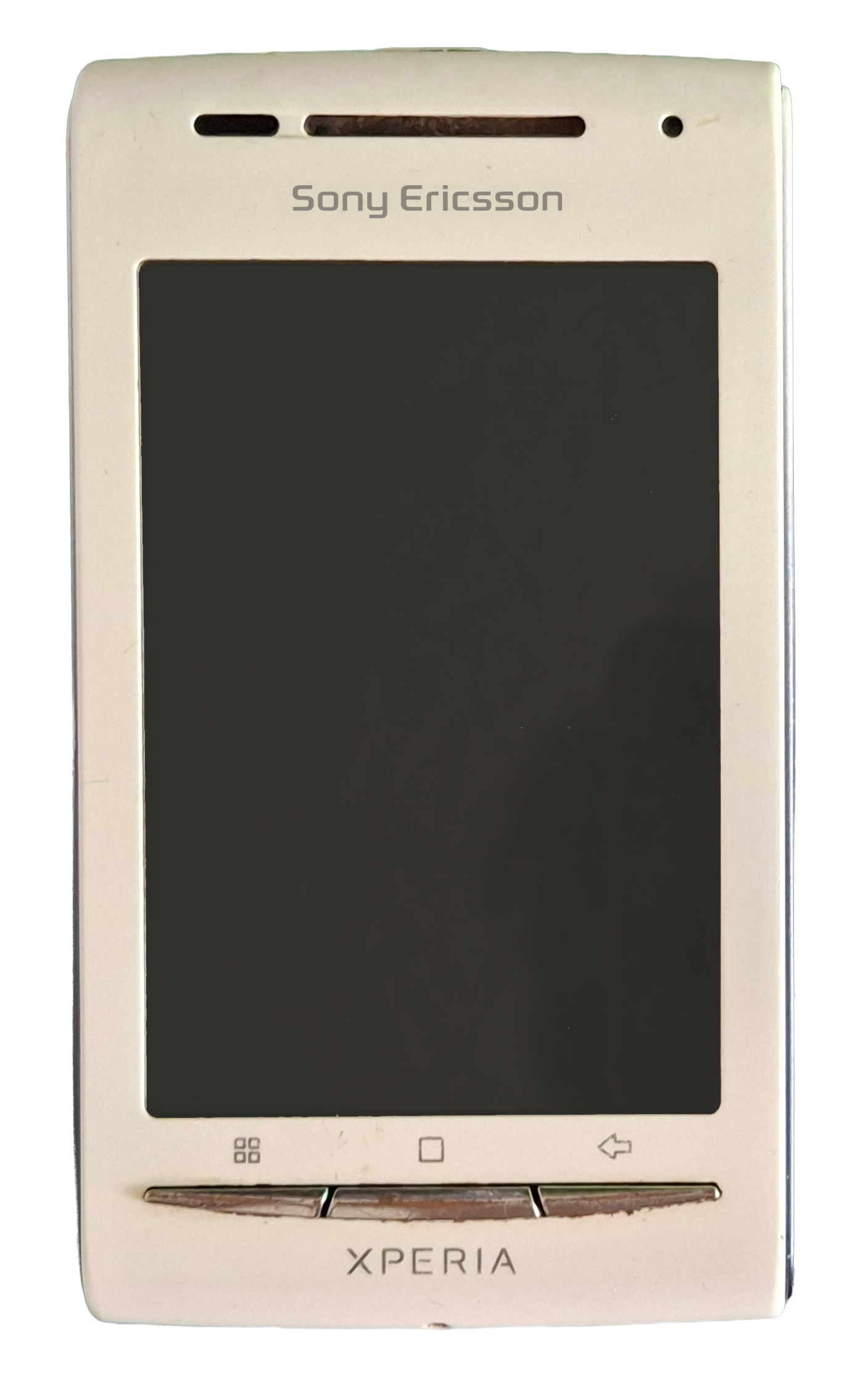
- Manufacturer: Sony Ericsson
- Type: Smartphone
- Series: Sony Ericsson Xperia
- Availability by region: Singapore 16 June 2010; 16 years ago
- Related: Sony Ericsson Xperia X10 mini
- Compatible networks: GSM 850,900 1800 1900 MHz; UMTS 900 2100 MHz; UMTS 850 1900 2100 MHz (North America)
- Form factor: Slate
- Dimensions: 99 mm (3.9 in) H 54 mm (2.1 in) W 15 mm (0.59 in) D
- Weight: 104 g (3.7 oz) with battery
- Operating system: Android 1.6 "Donut", upgradable to Android 2.1 "Eclair"; Unofficial upgrades to Android 4.4 "KitKat" via CyanogenMod
- CPU: 600 MHz ARMv6 processor, Qualcomm MSM7227 chipset
- GPU: Adreno 200
- Memory: 175 MB
- Storage: 128 MB
- Removable storage: microSDHC, up to 16 GB
- Battery: 1200 mAh Li-Polymer replaceable
- Display: 3.0-inch (76 mm) capacitive touchscreen, 16 M colors, 320×480 pixels, TFT LCD
- Connectivity: Bluetooth 2.1 with A2DP microUSB 2.0; 3.5 mm audio jack aGPS; Stereo FM tuner with RDS; Wi-Fi b/g
- Data inputs: Touchscreen, accelerometer, aGPS, magnetometer, proximity sensor, compass
- Codename: Shakira

The Sony Ericsson Xperia X8 is a mid-range 3G Android smartphone developed by Sony Ericsson in the Xperia series released in Q4 2010. It was sold in many countries worldwide, including the United States on AT&T Mobility and low-end pay-monthly contracts in the UK. It originally shipped running Android 1.6 but was upgraded in early 2011 to Android 2.1.

== Hardware ==
The phone has a 3.0-inch (76 mm) capacitive touch screen LCD. It has a resolution of 320 by 480 pixels half-size video graphics array (HVGA) with 24-bit depth. On the back is a 3.2-megapixel camera with fixed focus. Photos can be geotagged. The camera can be accessed via the touchscreen menu, or via the dedicated camera button on the side of the phone. The Xperia X8 uses a 600 MHz Qualcomm MSM7227 processor, has a 3-axis accelerometer and built-in GPS, a digital compass, an ambient light sensor and a lug for attaching a strap.

Multi-touch support was also added to several aftermarket firmware versions (ROMs) as a sideloaded module (now newer kernel included the code to enable it) which enabled users to use basic multitouch gestures such as pinch to zoom (on Synaptics digitizer) and real dual-touch (on Cypress digitizer) thanks to XDA recognized developer doixanh, AnDyx & andrej456, something that Sony Ericsson was adamant was impossible on the X8.

== Software ==
Sony Ericsson has made its own custom overlay on the Android system using an optimized version of the UX (user experience) interface, which consists of design elements, themes and custom applications. The four corners of the screen have replaceable shortcuts for commonly used applications. The main application is Sony Ericsson Timescape, a social networking application that combines messages from Facebook, Twitter, SMS and email into a flowing column on the home screen. Photos may be attached to contacts or sent to a Facebook account. The phone contains expected smartphone applications, and Wisepilot Navigation Software, Google Maps, YouTube, Sony's PlayNow Arena and TrackID (to identify a song by recording a small part of it).

=== Custom ROMs ===
Sony Ericsson was widely criticized by X8 users for failing to provide Android firmware upgrades versions beyond Android 2.1, which they stated that it was due to a lack of sufficient memory. The Android modding community released custom ROMs of Android 2.2 and 2.3, which ran stably on the device itself. One of the significant custom ROM for the mobile device is by CyanogenMod for Android 2.3, which requires rooting of the device.

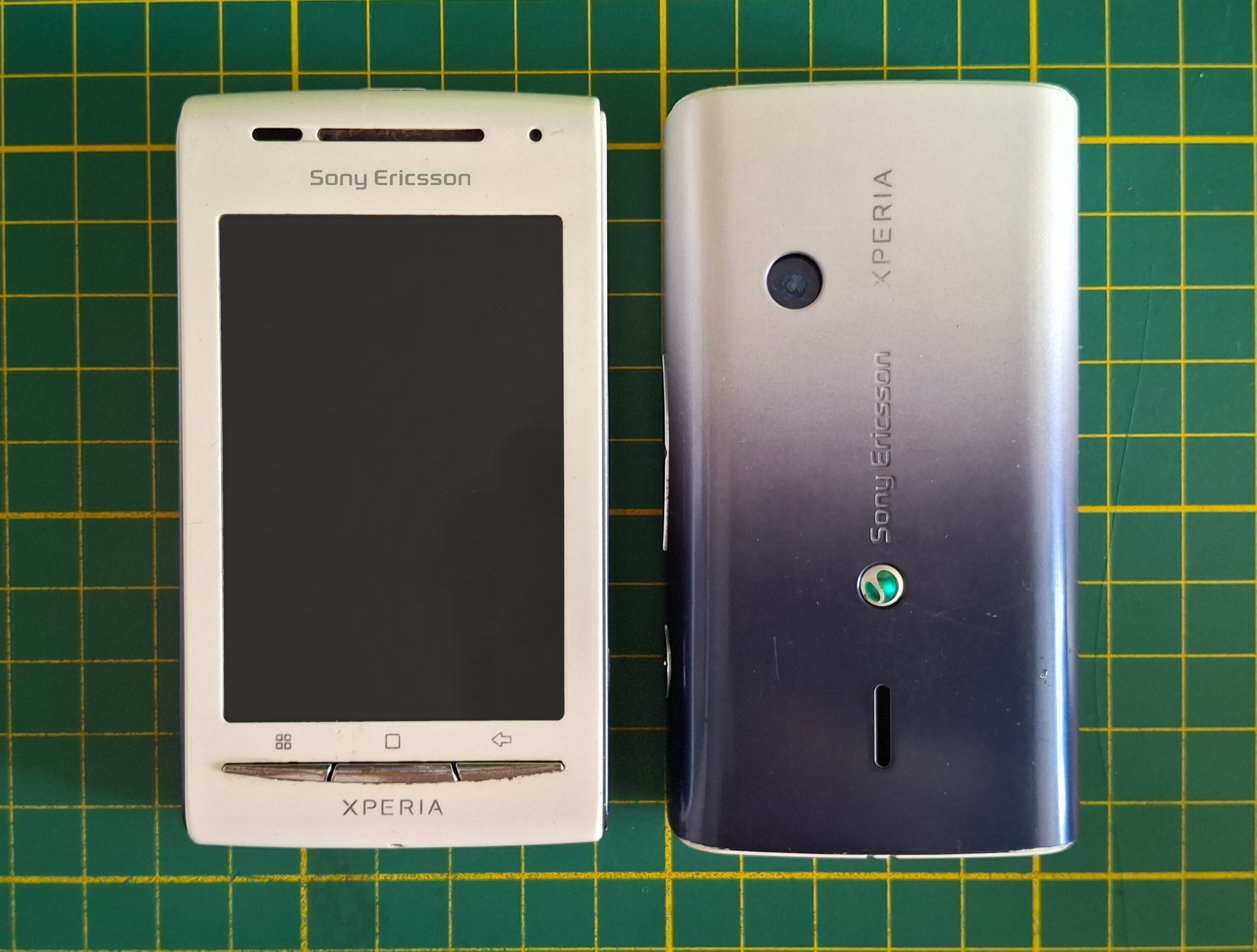
Front and back view of two Sony Ericsson Xperia X8 smartphones.

Custom ROMs for Ice Cream Sandwich (Android 4.0), Jelly Bean (4.1, 4.2) and KitKat (4.4) were also subsequently ported to the device by various users in the modding community with a custom kernel.

== See also ==
- List of Android smartphones
