= Sony Ericsson Xperia X10 Mini =

Cell phone model

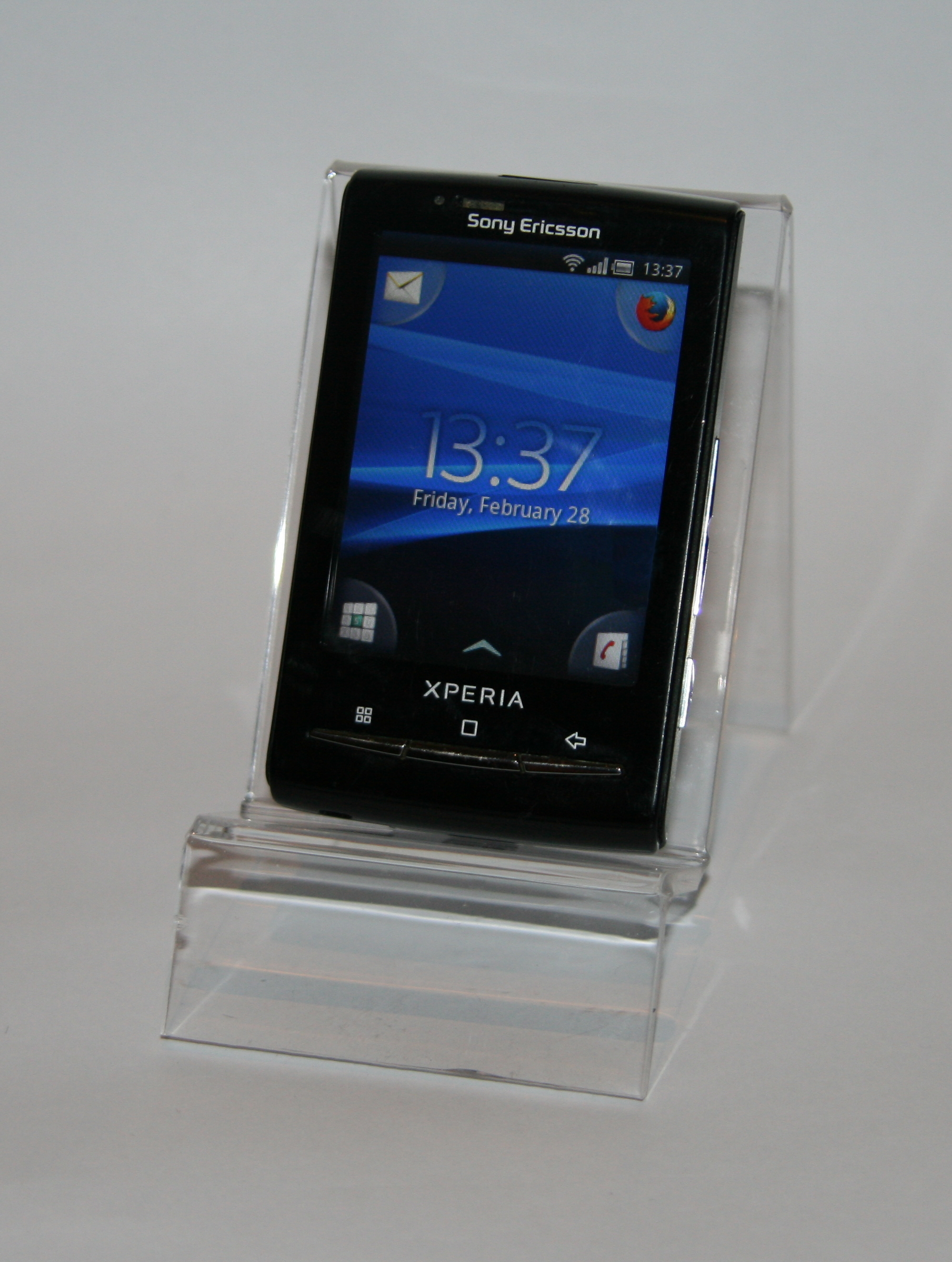
- Manufacturer: Sony Mobile Communications
- Series: Sony Xperia
- Related: Sony Ericsson Xperia X10
- Compatible networks: 2G Quad-band GSM/GPRS Class 10 (4+1/3+2 slots), 32–48 kbit/s/EDGE: 850/900/1800/1900 MHz 3G Tri-band UMTS/HSDPA/HSUPA: 850/1900/2100/900 MHz
- Dimensions: 83.0×50.0×16.0 mm (3.27×1.97×0.63 in)
- Weight: 88 g (3 oz) with battery
- CPU: 600 MHz Qualcomm MSM7227
- Memory: 256 MB RAM
- Storage: 128 MB in phone, up to 64 GB on microSDHC memory card (2 GB card included)
- Battery: BST-38 Standard battery: Li-Po 950 mAh.
- Rear camera: 5 MP with Auto focus, Flash LED illumination and Geo tagging.
- Display: TFT, 2.55 in (65 mm), 16M color, 240×320 pixels (157 ppi) (QVGA), hardened
- Connectivity: GPS; Wi-Fi 802.11 b/g Bluetooth 2.0 with A2DP microUSB 2.0; 3.5 mm audio jack
- Data inputs: Dual touch
- Codename: Robyn

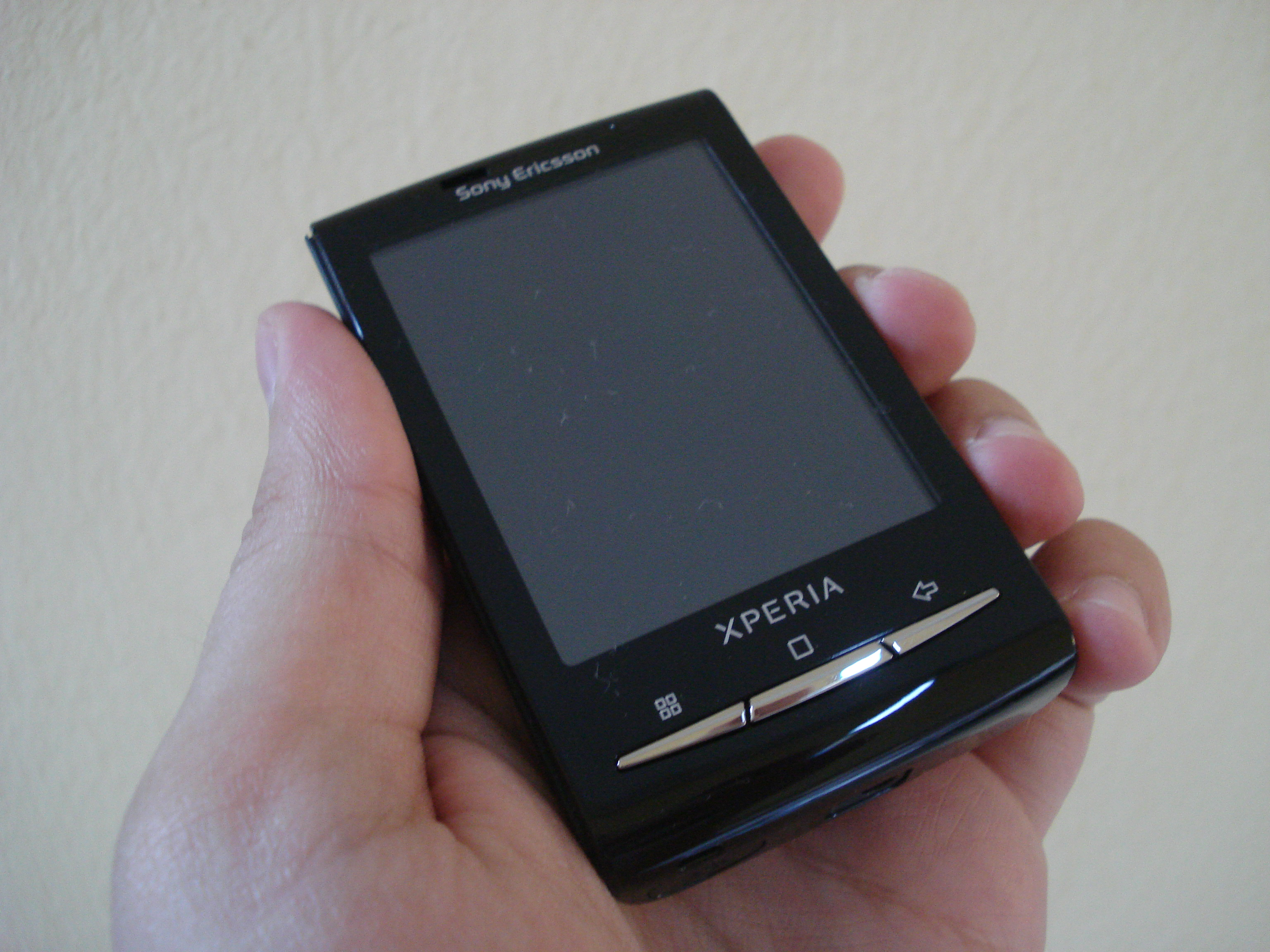
Sony Ericsson Xperia X10 Mini

The Sony Ericsson Xperia X10 Mini—also known as the E10i (international) or E10a (Americas)—is a smartphone by Sony Ericsson in the Xperia series. It is the second Sony Ericsson smartphone to run the Android operating system, and at the time was the smallest Android handset ever made.

The X10 Mini was first revealed on 14 February 2010. Apart from the physical dimensions, the phone also differs feature-wise as compared to the X10. Text input is done via a virtual keypad on the Mini and a full QWERTY, QWERTZ, or AZERTY slide-out keyboard on the X10 Mini pro.

== Sony Ericsson Xperia X10 Mini pro ==
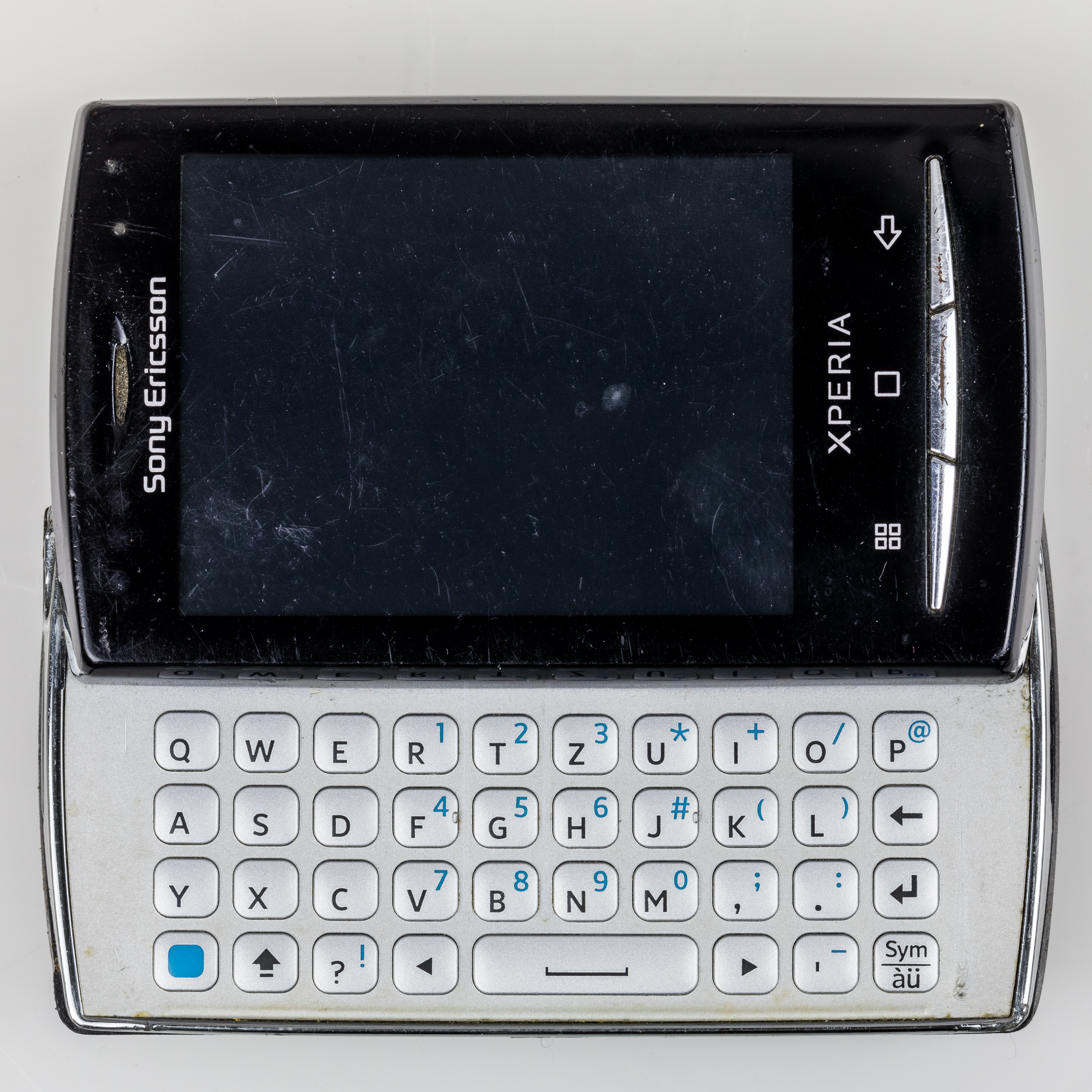
Sony Ericsson Xperia X10 mini pro

The Sony Ericsson Xperia X10 Mini pro (U20i/U20a) is an upgrade to the X10 Mini with many of the internal specifications being identical. The major differences between the original X10 Mini and X10 Mini pro are: the pro has a hardware keyboard and slightly larger dimensions (3.5 × 2.0 × 0.7 inches opposed to 3.3 × 2.0 × 0.6 inches).

The X10 Mini and X10 Mini pro are designed to look similar and share functionality with the larger Xperia X10, but are internally very different devices. Both handhelds lack Sony Ericsson's "Mediascape" media-management software, but include "Timescape" as well as the proprietary "Rachael" UI.

== OS upgrade ==
The X10 Mini/Pro (as well as the X10) originally ran Android 1.6, with an update to 2.1 being rolled out from Sunday 31 October 2010, to Tuesday 30 November 2010. The updated Xperia X10 Mini/Pro is more responsive and faster when compared to older Android version 1.6. However, Sony Ericsson has no plans to upgrade the 2010 Xperia phones beyond Android 2.1, except the X10 that was upgraded to Android 2.3.

Officially, both the X10 Mini and X10 Mini Pro can not be upgraded beyond Android 2.1, although unofficially, ports of CyanogenMod, among others, allow them to be upgraded to 2.2, 2.3, 4.0, and 4.1. These updates require rooting of the phone (which has warranty implications) and potentially flashing of a third-party kernel.

== Awards ==
- Red Dot Product Design Award 2010
- European Mobile Phone 2010–2011

== See also ==
- Sony Ericsson Xperia X8
- List of Android smartphones
