= International Display Technology =

International Display Technology (IDTech) was a partnership between Taiwan's Chi Mei Corporation and IBM Japan. Its manufacturing factory was sold to Sony in 2005. The headquarters was renamed to the current name, CMO Japan Co., Ltd. in 2006. It manufactured the IBM T220/T221 LCD monitors, among other products.
