= Spice Money =

Indian rural fintech company

Spice Money Limited
- Type: Public
- Industry: Fintech
- Founded: 2000
- Founder: Dilip Modi
- Headquarters: Noida, India
- Parent: DiGiSPICE Technologies
- Website: spicemoney.com

Spice Money (SML) is an Indian rural financial services company headquartered in Noida. It was founded in 2000 by Dilip Modi, who serves as the chairman and group CEO of DiGiSPICE Technologies. SML is a subsidiary of DiGiSPICE Technologies. It provides financial services, such as money transfer, cash deposit, account opening, bill payments, mini ATMs and more services. It engages with local individuals (Adhikari's) to assist its customers with banking requirements. In 2024, the company reported having 1.4 million Adhikari's on its platform.

== History ==
Spice Money began its operations as a digital wallet under the name Spice Digital Limited. Later, the company expanded into ticketing, bill payment, banking, and micro ATM services. It operates as a wholly owned subsidiary of Digispice Technologies. In 2015, Spice Money received license to operate as a PPI from RBI and in 2017, the company launched its micro ATM and bill pay services. This was followed by the mPOS service launch in 2018, which earned Spice Money the NPCI National Payments Excellence Award. In January 2018, Spice Money received its final license from the Reserve Bank of India to operate as a Bharat Bill Payment Operating Unit (BBPOU) within the Bharat Bill Payment System (BBPS).

In 2020, the company launched a proposition to assist nanopreneurs with onboarding. This initiative helped entrepreneurs in rural and semi-urban areas by launching products like, AEPS, IRCTC ticketing, Cash Management services (CMS), Lending etc. In August 2021, the company announced the establishment of an ATM network with 1 lakh micro-ATMs operating across rural India.

In September 2023, a strategic partnership was formed with Grameen Foundation for Social Impact (GFSI) India, a non-profit organization supporting underserved communities. Spice Money also partnered with NSDL Payments Bank and Axis Bank, enabling the opening of zero-balance savings or current accounts for rural citizens through its Adhikari platform.

== Controversy ==
In December 2021, the Reserve Bank of India (RBI) imposed a monetary penalty on Spice Money, for non-compliance with norms, as stated in a central bank announcement. Spice Money incurred fines of ₹1 crore.
