= Display resolution standards =

Commonly used display resolutions

A chart showing the number of pixels in different display resolutions

A display resolution standard is a commonly used width and height dimension (display resolution) of an electronic visual display device, measured in pixels. This information is used for electronic devices such as a computer monitor. Certain combinations of width and height are standardized (e.g. by VESA) and typically given a name and an initialism which is descriptive of its dimensions.

The graphics display resolution is also known as the display mode or the video mode, although these terms usually include further specifications such as the image refresh rate and the color depth. The resolution itself only indicates the number of distinct pixels that can be displayed on a screen, which affects the sharpness and clarity of the image. It can be controlled by various factors, such as the type of display device, the signal format, the aspect ratio, and the refresh rate.

Some graphics display resolutions are frequently referenced with a single number (e.g. in "1080p" or "4K"), which represents the number of horizontal or vertical pixels. More generally, any resolution can be expressed as two numbers separated by a multiplication sign (e.g. "1920×1080"), which represent the width and height in pixels. Since most screens have a landscape format to accommodate the human field of view, the first number for the width (in columns) is larger than the second for the height (in lines), and this conventionally holds true for handheld devices that are predominantly or even exclusively used in portrait orientation.

The graphics display resolution is influenced by the aspect ratio, which is the ratio of the width to the height of the display. The aspect ratio determines how the image is scaled and stretched or cropped to fit the screen. The most common aspect ratios for graphics displays are 4:3, 16:10 (equal to 8:5), 16:9, and 21:9. The aspect ratio also affects the perceived size of objects on the screen.

The native screen resolution together with the physical dimensions of the graphics display can be used to calculate its pixel density. An increase in the pixel density often correlates with a decrease in the size of individual pixels on a display. Some graphics displays support multiple resolutions and aspect ratios, which can be changed by the user or by the software. In particular, some devices use a hardware/native resolution that is a simple multiple of the recommended software/virtual resolutions in order to show finer details; marketing terms for this include "Retina display".

== Table of display resolution standards ==
Graphic display resolutions by vertical resolution and aspect ratio
Height (px)	Width (px) and standard classification if available									
Height (px)	Full		Wide					Ultra-wide		
Height (px)	5∶4 (1.25)	4∶3 (1.3̅)	3∶2 (1.5)	16∶10 (1.6)	15∶9 (1.6̅)	16∶9 (1.775–1.8̅1̅)	17∶9 (1.8̅)	18∶9 (2.0–2.2̅)	21∶9 (2.3̅–2.4)	32∶9 (3.5̅)
120		160 QQVGA						240		
160		213	240 HQVGA					320		
240		320 QVGA	360 WQVGA	384 WQVGA	400 WQVGA	432 FWQVGA (9∶5)		480		
320		426	480 HVGA					640		
480	600	640 VGA	720 WVGA	768 WVGA	800 WVGA	848, 854 FWVGA		960 FWVGA		
540	675	720				960 qHD		1080		
576	720 PAL	768 PAL				1024 WSVGA		1152		
600	750	800 SVGA			1024 WSVGA (≈128∶75)			1200		
640	800		960 DVGA			1136		1280		
720	900	960				1280 HD		1440		
768	960	1024 XGA	1152 WXGA		1280 WXGA	1360, 1366 (F)WXGA		1536		
800	1000			1280 WXGA				1600		
864	1080	1152 XGA+	1280 WXGA+					1732		
900	1152			1440 WXGA+		1600 HD+		1800		
960	1200	1280 SXGA−	1440 FWXGA+					1920		
1024	1280 SXGA		1536 DXGA	1600 WSXGA (25∶16)				2048		
1050	1313	1400 SXGA+		1680 WSXGA+				2100		
1080	1280 (32∶27) 1350 (5:4)	1440				1920 (F)HD	2048 DCI 2K	2160	2560 UWFHD	3840 DFHD
1152	1440 QPAL (5:4)	1536; QPAL				2048 QWXGA		2304		
1200	1500	1600 UXGA	1800	1920 WUXGA	2000			2400		
1280	1600							2560		
1440	1800		2160			2560 (W)QHD		2880	3440 UWQHD (21.5∶9)	5120 DQHD
1536	1920	2048 QXGA						3072		
1600	2000			2560 WQXGA				3200	3840 UW4K (21.6:9)	
1620	2025					2880 3K		3240		
1800	2250			2880 WQXGA+		3200 QHD+		3600		
2048	2560 QSXGA		3200 WQSXGA (25∶16)					4096		
2100	2625	2800 QSXGA+						4200		
2160	2700					3840 4K UHD	4096 DCI 4K	4320	5120 UW5K	7680 DUHD
2400	3000	3200 QUXGA		3840 WQUXGA				4800		
2880	3200					5120 5K		5760		
4320	5250					7680 8K UHD		8640	10240 10K	
	Full		Wide					Ultra-wide		

== Aspect ratio ==
Multiple display standards compared. Printable variant is available here.

The favored aspect ratio of mass-market display industry products has changed gradually from 4:3, then to 16:10, then to 16:9, and has now changed to 18:9 for smartphones. The 4:3 aspect ratio generally reflects older products, especially the era of the cathode ray tube (CRT). The 16:10 aspect ratio had its largest use in the 1995–2010 period, and the 16:9 aspect ratio tends to reflect post-2010 mass-market computer monitor, laptop, and entertainment products displays. On CRTs, there was often a difference between the aspect ratio of the computer resolution and the aspect ratio of the display causing non-square pixels (e.g. 320 × 200 or 1280 × 1024 on a 4:3 display).

The 4:3 aspect ratio was common in older television cathode ray tube (CRT) displays, which were not easily adaptable to a wider aspect ratio. When good quality alternate technologies (i.e., liquid crystal displays (LCDs) and plasma displays) became more available and less costly, around the year 2000, the common computer displays and entertainment products moved to a wider aspect ratio, first to the 16:10 ratio. The 16:10 ratio allowed some compromise between showing older 4:3 aspect ratio broadcast TV shows, but also allowing better viewing of widescreen movies. However, around the year 2005, home entertainment displays (i.e., TV sets) gradually moved from 16:10 to the 16:9 aspect ratio, for further improvement of viewing widescreen movies. By about 2007, virtually all mass-market entertainment displays were 16:9. In 2011, 1920 × 1080 (Full HD, the native resolution of Blu-ray) was the favored resolution in the most heavily marketed entertainment market displays. The next standard, 3840 × 2160 (4K UHD), was first sold in 2013.

Also in 2013, displays with 2560 × 1080 (aspect ratio 64:27 or 2.3̅7̅0̅, however commonly referred to as "21:9" for easy comparison with 16:9) appeared, which closely approximate the common CinemaScope movie standard aspect ratio of 2.35–2.40. In 2014, "21:9" screens with pixel dimensions of 3440 × 1440 (actual aspect ratio 43:18 or 2.38̅) became available as well.

The computer display industry maintained the 16:10 aspect ratio longer than the entertainment industry, but in the 2005–2010 period, computers were increasingly marketed as dual-use products, with uses in the traditional computer applications, but also as means of viewing entertainment content. In this time frame, with the notable exception of Apple, almost all desktop, laptop, and display manufacturers gradually moved to promoting only 16:9 aspect ratio displays. By 2011, the 16:10 aspect ratio had virtually disappeared from the Windows laptop display market (although Mac laptops are still mostly 16:10, including the 2880 × 1800 15" Retina MacBook Pro and the 2560 × 1600 13" Retina MacBook Pro). One consequence of this transition was that the highest available resolutions moved generally downward (i.e., the move from 1920 × 1200 laptop displays to 1920 × 1080 displays).

In response to usability flaws of now common 16:9 displays in office/professional applications, Microsoft and Huawei started to offer notebooks with a 3:2 aspect ratio. By 2021, Huawei also offers a monitor display offering this aspect ratio, targeted towards professional uses.

== High-definition ==
HD-based display resolutions
Name		H (px)	V (px)	H:V	H × V (Mpx)	VESA
qHD		960	540	16:9	0.518	0.52M9
HD		1280	720	16:9	0.922	0.92M9
HD+		1600	900	16:9	1.440	1.44M9
FHD	2K	1920	1080	16:9	2.074	2.07M9
(W)QHD		2560	1440	16:9	3.686	3.69M9
QHD+		3200	1800	16:9	5.760	5.76M9
UHD	4K	3840	2160	16:9	8.294	8.29M9
	5K	5120	2880	16:9	14.746	14.75M9
	8K	7680	4320	16:9	33.178	33.18M9
	16K	15360	8640	16:9	132.710	132.71M9

All standard HD resolutions share a 16∶9 aspect ratio, although some derived resolutions with smaller or larger ratios also exist, e.g. 4∶3 and 64∶27, respectively. Most of the narrower resolutions are only used for storing, not for displaying videos, while the wider resolutions are often available as physical displays. YouTube, for instance, recommends users upload videos in a 16:9 format with 240, 360, 480 (SD), 720, 1080 (HD), 1440, 2160 (4K) or 4320 (8K) lines.

While the monikers for those resolutions originally all used a letter prefix with "HD" for the multiplier, and possibly a "+" suffix for intermediate or taller formats, the newer, larger formats tend to be used with "K" notation for thousands of pixels of horizontal resolution, but may be disambiguated by a system qualifier that includes "HD", e.g. "8K UHD" instead of just "8K".

=== 960 × 540 (qHD) ===
Note: qHD is quarter HD; QHD is quad HD

qHD is a display resolution of 960 × 540 pixels, which is exactly one-quarter of a Full HD (1080p) frame, in a 16:9 aspect ratio. Notably, it is neither "qFHD" nor 640 × 360 which would be quarter of "HD" resolution (720p).

Some of the few tabletop TVs to use this as its native resolution from around 2005 were the Sony XEL-1 and the Sharp Aquos P50. Sharp marketed its ED TV sets with this resolution as "PAL optimal".

Similar to DVGA, this resolution became popular for high-end smartphone displays in early 2011. Mobile phones including the Jolla, Sony Xperia C, HTC Sensation, Motorola Droid RAZR, LG Optimus L9, Microsoft Lumia 535, and Samsung Galaxy S4 Mini have displays with the qHD resolution, as does the PlayStation Vita portable game system.

=== 1280 × 720 (HD) ===
The HD or 720p resolution of 1280 × 720 pixels stems from high-definition television (HDTV), where it originally used 50 or 60 frames per second. With its 16:9 aspect ratio, it is exactly 2 times the width and 1 1/2 times the height of 4:3 VGA (640 × 480), which shares its aspect ratio and 480 line count with NTSC. HD, therefore, has exactly 3 times as many pixels as VGA, i.e. almost 1 megapixel.

In the mid-2000s, when the digital HD technology and standard debuted on the market, this type of resolution was often referred to by the branded name "HD ready" or "HDr", which had specified it as a minimum resolution for devices to qualify for the certification. However, few screens have been built that use this resolution natively. Most employ 16:9 panels with 768 lines instead (WXGA), which resulted in odd numbers of pixels per line, i.e. 1365 1/3 are rounded to 1360, 1364, 1366 or even 1376, the next multiple of 16.

=== 1920 × 1080 (FHD) ===
FHD (Full HD) is the resolution 1920 × 1080 used by the 1080p and 1080i HDTV video formats. It has a 16:9 aspect ratio and 2,073,600 total pixels, i.e. very close to 2 megapixels, and is exactly 50% larger than 720p HD (1280 × 720) in each dimension for a total of 2.25 times as many pixels. When using interlacing, the uncompressed bandwidth requirements are similar to those of 720p at the same field rate (a 12.5% increase, as one field of 1080i video is 1,036,800 pixels, and one frame of 720p video is 921,600 pixels). Although the number of pixels is the same for 1080p and 1080i, the effective resolution is somewhat lower for the interlaced format, as it is necessary to use some vertical low-pass filtering to reduce temporal artifacts such as interline twitter.

Sometimes, this resolution is referred to simply as HD. This is evident from derived terms like qHD (quarter), which have a half of the lines and columns of their common base 1920 × 1080, whereas QHD (quadruple) has double the dimensions of 1280 × 720 instead.

When set in relation to higher resolutions, 1920 × 1080 is also referred to as 2K because it has roughly 2000 pixels of horizontal resolution.

The next bigger resolution from 1920 × 1080 in vertical direction is 1920 × 1200 (16∶10), which is hence called FHD+ by some producers, but is elsewhere known as WUXGA, the wider variant of 1600 × 1200 UXGA.

=== 2048 × 1080 (DCI 2K) ===
DCI 2K is a standardized format established by the Digital Cinema Initiatives consortium in 2005 for 2K video projection. This format has a resolution of 2048 × 1080 (2.2 megapixels) with an aspect ratio of 256∶135 (1.89̅6̅2̅) or roughly "17∶9". This is the native resolution for DCI-compliant 2K digital projectors – active displays with this resolution are rare. The display aspect ratio is frequently wider than the native one, requiring non-square pixels.

=== 2560 × 1080 (UWFHD) ===
The resolution 2560 × 1080 is equivalent to Full HD (1920 × 1080) extended in width by one third, with an aspect ratio of 64:27 (2.3̅7̅0̅, or 21.3̅:9). Monitors at this resolution usually contain built-in firmware to divide the screen into two 1280 × 1080 screens.

There are other, non-standard display resolutions with 1080 lines whose aspect ratios fall between the usual 16∶9 and the ultra-wide 64∶27, e.g. 18∶9, 18.5∶9, 19∶9 and 19.5∶9. They are mostly used in smartphones or phablets and do not have established names, but may be subsumed under the umbrella term "ultra-wide (full) HD".

=== 2560 × 1440 (QHD) ===
Note: qHD is quarter HD; QHD is quad HD

QHD (Quad HD) or 1440p is a display resolution of 2560 × 1440 pixels. The name "QHD" reflects the fact that it has four times as many pixels as HD (720p). It is also sometimes called "WQHD"; the W is technically redundant since the HD resolutions are all widescreen, but it emphasizes the distinction between QHD and qHD (960 × 540).

This resolution was under consideration by the ATSC in the late 1980s to become the standard HDTV format, because it is exactly 3 times the height of SDTV NTSC television signals, with a wider aspect ratio. Pragmatic technical constraints made them choose the now well-known 16:9 formats of 1280 × 720 (1.5× NTSC/VGA height) and 1920 × 1080 (2× PAL height of 540 lines) instead.

In October 2006, Chi Mei Optoelectronics (CMO) announced a 47-inch 1440p LCD panel to be released in Q2 2007; the panel was planned to debut at FPD International 2008 in a form of autostereoscopic 3D display. As of the end of 2013, monitors with this resolution were becoming more common.

The 27-inch version of the Apple Cinema Display monitor introduced in July 2010 has a native resolution of 2560 × 1440, as did its successor, the 27-inch Apple Thunderbolt Display.

The resolution is also used in portable devices. In September 2012, Samsung announced the Series 9 WQHD laptop with a 13-inch 2560 × 1440 display. In August 2013, LG announced a 5.5-inch QHD smartphone display, which was used in the LG G3. In October 2013 Vivo announced a smartphone with a 2560 × 1440 display. Other phone manufacturers followed in 2014, such as Samsung with the Galaxy Note 4, and Google and Motorola with the Nexus 6 smartphone. By the mid-2010s, it was a common resolution among flagship phones such as the HTC 10, the Lumia 950, and the Galaxy S6 and S7.

=== 2880 × 1620 (3K) ===
The resolution 2880 × 1620 has a 16:9 aspect ratio and is exactly 2.25 times as many pixels as the Full HD resolution. It has been referred to as "3K", "WQXGA", and "WQHD+ 1620p".

=== 3200 × 1800 (QHD+) ===
The resolution 3200 × 1800 has a 16:9 aspect ratio and is exactly four times as many pixels as the 1600 × 900 HD+ resolution, and is therefore referred to as "QHD+" (Quad HD+). It has also been referred to as simply "QHD" by some companies.

The first products announced to use this resolution were the 2013 HP Envy 14 TouchSmart Ultrabook and the 13.3-inch Samsung Ativ Q.

=== 3440 × 1440 (UWQHD) ===
The resolution 3440 × 1440 is equivalent to QHD (2560 × 1440) extended in width by 34%, giving it an aspect ratio of 43:18 (2.38̅:1, or 21.5:9; commonly marketed as simply "21:9"). The first monitor to support this resolution was the 34-inch LG 34UM95-P. This monitor was first released in Germany in late December 2013, before being officially announced at CES 2014.

=== 3840 × 1080 (DFHD) ===
The resolution 3840 × 1080 is equivalent to two Full HD (1920 × 1080) displays side by side or one vertical half of a 4K UHD (3840 × 2160) display. It has an aspect ratio of 32:9 (3.5̅:1), close to the 3.6:1 ratio of IMAX UltraWideScreen 3.6. Samsung monitors at this resolution contain built-in firmware to divide the screen into two 1920 × 1080 screens, or one 2560 × 1080 and one 1280 × 1080 screen.

=== 3840 × 1600 ===
The resolution 3840 × 1600 has a 12:5 aspect ratio, i.e. 2.4 or 21.6:9, which is commonly marketed as simply "21:9". It is equivalent to WQXGA (2560 × 1600) extended in width by 50%, or 4K UHD (3840 × 2160) reduced in height by 26%. This resolution is commonly encountered in cinematic 4K content that has been cropped vertically to a widescreen aspect ratio. The first monitor to support this resolution was the 37.5-inch LG 38UC99-W. Other vendors followed, with Dell U3818DW, HP Z38c, and Acer XR382CQK.

This resolution has been referred to as UW4K, WQHD+, UWQHD+ or QHD+, though no single name is agreed upon.

=== 3840 × 2160 (4K UHD) ===
The resolution 3840 × 2160, sometimes referred to as 4K UHD or 4K × 2K, has a 16:9 aspect ratio and 8,294,400 pixels. It is double the size of Full HD (1920 × 1080) in both dimensions for a total of four times as many pixels, and triple the size of HD (1280 × 720) in both dimensions for a total of nine times as many pixels. It is the lowest common multiple of the HDTV resolutions.

3840 × 2160 was chosen as the resolution of the UHDTV1 format defined in SMPTE ST 2036-1, as well as the 4K UHDTV system defined in ITU-R BT.2020 and the UHD-1 broadcast standard from DVB. It is also the minimum resolution requirement for CEA's definition of an Ultra HD display. Before the publication of these standards, it was sometimes casually referred to as "QFHD" (Quad Full HD).

The first commercial displays capable of this resolution include an 82-inch LCD TV revealed by Samsung in early 2008, the Sony SRM-L560, a 56-inch LCD reference monitor announced in October 2009, an 84-inch display demonstrated by LG in mid-2010, and a 27.84-inch 158 PPI 4K IPS monitor for medical purposes launched by Innolux in November 2010. In October 2011 Toshiba announced the REGZA 55x3, which is claimed to be the first 4K glasses-free 3D TV.

DisplayPort supports 3840 × 2160 at 30 Hz in version 1.1 and added support for up to 75 Hz in version 1.2 (2009) and 120 Hz in version 1.3 (2014), while HDMI added support for 3840 × 2160 at 30 Hz in version 1.4 (2009) and 60 Hz in version 2.0 (2013).

When support for 4K at 60 Hz was added in DisplayPort 1.2, no DisplayPort timing controllers (TCONs) existed which were capable of processing the necessary amount of data from a single video stream. As a result, the first 4K monitors from 2013 and early 2014, such as the Sharp PN-K321, Asus PQ321Q, and Dell UP2414Q and UP3214Q, were addressed internally as two 1920 × 2160 monitors side by side instead of a single display and made use of DisplayPort's Multi-Stream Transport (MST) feature to multiplex a separate signal for each half over the connection, splitting the data between two timing controllers. Newer timing controllers became available in 2014, and after mid-2014 new 4K monitors such as the Asus PB287Q no longer rely on MST tiling technique to achieve 4K at 60 Hz, instead, using the standard SST (Single-Stream Transport) approach.

In 2015, Sony announced the Xperia Z5 Premium, the first smartphone with a 4K display, and in 2017 Sony announced the Xperia XZ Premium, the first smartphone with a 4K HDR display.

=== 4096 × 2160 (DCI 4K) ===
4096 × 2160, referred to as DCI 4K, Cinema 4K or 4K × 2K, is the resolution used by the 4K container format defined by the Digital Cinema Initiatives Digital Cinema System Specification, a prominent standard in the cinema industry. This resolution has an aspect ratio of 256:135 (1.89̅6̅2̅:1), and 8,847,360 total pixels. This is the native resolution for DCI 4K digital projectors and displays.

HDMI added support for 4096 × 2160 at 24 Hz in version 1.4 and 60 Hz in version 2.0.

=== 5120 × 1440 (DQHD) ===
Ultrawide (curved) monitors with a 32:9 aspect ratio and a 5120 × 1440 resolution have been referred to as Dual QHD or DQHD. It is sometimes also called "Super-Ultrawide" for marketing purposes.

=== 5120 × 2160 ===
The resolution 5120 × 2160 is equivalent to 4K UHD (3840 × 2160) extended in width by one third, giving it a 64:27 aspect ratio (2.3̅7̅0̅ or 21.3̅:9, commonly marketed as simply "21:9") and 11,059,200 total pixels. It is exactly double the size of 2560 × 1080 in both dimensions, for a total of four times as many pixels. The first displays to support this resolution were 105-inch televisions, the LG 105UC9 and the Samsung UN105S9W. In December 2017, LG announced a 34-inch 5120 × 2160 monitor, the 34WK95U, and in January 2021 the 40-inch 40WP95C. LG refers to this resolution as "5K2K WUHD".

=== 5120 × 2880 (5K) ===
The resolution 5120 × 2880, commonly referred to as 5K or 5K × 3K, has a 16:9 aspect ratio and 14,745,600 pixels. Although it is not established by any of the UHDTV standards, some manufacturers such as Dell have referred to it as "UHD+". It is exactly double the pixel count of QHD (2560 × 1440) in both dimensions for a total of four times as many pixels, and is one third larger than 4K UHD (3840 × 2160) in both dimensions for a total of 1.7̅7̅ times as many pixels. The line count of 2880 is also the least common multiple of 480 and 576, the scanline count of NTSC and PAL, respectively. Such a resolution can vertically scale SD content to fit by natural numbers (6 for NTSC and 5 for PAL). Horizontal scaling of SD is always fractional (non-anamorphic: 5.33...5.47, anamorphic: 7.11...7.29).

The first display with this resolution was the Dell UltraSharp UP2715K, announced on September 5, 2014. On October 16, 2014, Apple announced the iMac with Retina 5K display.

DisplayPort version 1.3 added support for 5K at 60 Hz over a single cable, whereas version 1.2 was only capable of 5K at 30 Hz. Early 5K 60 Hz displays such as the Dell UltraSharp UP2715K and HP DreamColor Z27q that lacked DisplayPort 1.3 support required two DisplayPort 1.2 connections to operate at 60 Hz, in a tiled display mode similar to early 4K displays using DP MST.

=== 7680 × 2160 (DUHD) ===
Ultrawide (curved) monitors with a 32:9 aspect ratio and a 7680 × 2160 resolution have been referred to as Dual UHD or DUHD. This aspect ratio is sometimes also called "Super-Ultrawide" for marketing purposes. The resolution 7680 × 2160 is equivalent to two Ultra HD (3840 × 2160) displays side by side or one vertical half of a 8K UHD (7680 × 4320) display. The aspect ratio of 32:9 (3.5̅:1) is close to the 3.6:1 ratio of IMAX UltraWideScreen 3.6.

The first display with this resolution was the Samsung Odyssey Neo G9 Gaming Monitor (Model Name: G95NC), announced on January 3, 2023 with world's first DisplayPort 2.1 and HDMI 2.1 support allowing it to run at 240 Hz refresh rate with HDR and 30 bit/px color depth.

=== 7680 × 4320 (8K UHD) ===
The resolution 7680 × 4320, sometimes referred to as 8K UHD, has a 16:9 aspect ratio and 33,177,600 pixels. It is exactly double the size of 4K UHD (3840 × 2160) in each dimension for a total of four times as many pixels, and Quadruple the size of Full HD (1920 × 1080) in each dimension for a total of sixteen times as many pixels. 7680 × 4320 was chosen as the resolution of the UHDTV2 format defined in SMPTE ST 2036-1, as well as the 8K UHDTV system defined in ITU-R BT.2020 and the UHD-2 broadcast standard from DVB.

DisplayPort 1.3, finalized by VESA in late 2014, added support for 7680 × 4320 at 30 Hz (or 60 Hz with Y′C_{B}C_{R} 4:2:0 subsampling). VESA's Display Stream Compression (DSC), which was part of early DisplayPort 1.3 drafts and would have enabled 8K at 60 Hz without subsampling, was cut from the specification prior to publication of the final draft.

DSC support was reintroduced with the publication of DisplayPort 1.4 in March 2016. Using DSC, a "visually lossless" form of compression, formats up to 7680 × 4320 (8K UHD) at 60 Hz with HDR and 30 bit/px color depth are possible without subsampling.

== Video Graphics Array (VGA and derivatives) ==
VGA-based display resolutions
Name	H (px)	V (px)	H:V	H × V (Mpx)	VESA
QQVGA	160	120	4:3	0.019	19.20K3
HQVGA	240	160	3:2	0.038	38.40K2
QVGA	320	240	4:3	0.077	76.80K3
WQVGA	400	240	5:3	0.096	96.00K6
HVGA	480	320	3:2	0.154	0.15M2
VGA	640	480	4:3	0.307	0.31M3
WVGA	800	480	5:3	0.384	0.38M6
FWVGA	854	480	≈ 16:9	0.410	0.41M9
WSVGA	1024	576	16:9	0.590	0.59M9
SVGA	800	600	4:3	0.480	0.48M3
WSVGA	1024	600	128:75	0.614	0.61M9
DVGA	960	640	3:2	0.614	0.61M2
QuadVGA	1280	960	4:3	1.229	1.23M3

=== 160 × 120 (QQVGA) ===
Quarter-QVGA (QQVGA or qqVGA) denotes a resolution of 160 × 120 (4:3 storage aspect ratio) or 120 × 160 pixels, usually used in displays of handheld devices. The term Quarter-QVGA signifies a resolution of one fourth the number of pixels in a QVGA display (half the number of vertical and half the number of horizontal pixels) which itself has one fourth the number of pixels in a VGA display. There are also devices with QQVGA 160 × 128 (5:4 storage aspect ratio).

The abbreviation "qqVGA" may be used to distinguish "quarter" from "quad", just like qVGA.

=== 240 × 160 ===
HQVGA (or Half-QVGA) denotes a display screen resolution of 240 × 160 or 160 × 240 pixels, as seen on the Game Boy Advance.

=== 320 × 240 (QVGA) ===
QVGA compared to VGA

Quarter VGA (QVGA or qVGA) is a popular term for a computer display with 320 × 240 display resolution. QVGA displays were most often used in mobile phones, personal digital assistants (PDA), and some handheld game consoles. Often the displays are in a "portrait" orientation (i.e., taller than they are wide, as opposed to "landscape") and are referred to as 240 × 320.

The name comes from having a quarter of the 640 × 480 maximum resolution of the original IBM Video Graphics Array display technology, which became a de facto industry standard in the late 1980s. QVGA is not a standard mode offered by the VGA BIOS, even though VGA and compatible chipsets support a QVGA-sized Mode X. The term refers only to the display's resolution and thus the abbreviated term QVGA or Quarter VGA is more appropriate to use.

QVGA resolution is also used in digital video recording equipment as a low-resolution mode requiring less data storage capacity than higher resolutions, typically in still digital cameras with video recording capability, and some mobile phones. Each frame is an image of 320 × 240 pixels. QVGA video is typically recorded at 15 or 30 frames per second. QVGA mode describes the size of an image in pixels, commonly called the resolution; numerous video file formats support this resolution.

While QVGA is a lower resolution than VGA, at higher resolutions the capital "Q" prefix commonly means "quad(ruple)" or four times higher display resolution (e.g., QXGA is four times higher resolution than XGA). To distinguish "quarter" from "quad", a small "q" is sometimes used for "quarter".

Some examples of devices that use QVGA display resolution include the iPod Classic, Samsung i5500, LG Optimus L3-E400, Galaxy Fit, Y and Pocket, HTC Wildfire, Sony Ericsson Xperia X10 Mini and Mini pro and Nintendo 3DS' bottom screen.

=== 400 × 240 (WQVGA) ===
Wide QVGA or WQVGA are some display resolutions having the same height in pixels as QVGA, but wider.

Since QVGA is 320 pixels wide and 240 pixels high (aspect ratio of 4:3), the resolution of a WQVGA screen might be 360 × 240 (3:2 aspect ratio), 384 × 240 (16:10 aspect ratio), 400 × 240 (5:3 – such as the Nintendo 3DS screen), 426 × 240, 428 × 240 (≈16:9 ratio) or 432 × 240 (18:10 aspect ratio). As with WVGA, exact ratios of n:9 are difficult because of the way VGA controllers internally deal with pixels. For instance, when using graphical combinatorial operations on pixels, VGA controllers will use 1 bit per pixel. Since bits cannot be accessed individually but by chunks of 16 or an even higher power of 2, this limits the horizontal resolution to a 16-pixel granularity, i.e., the horizontal resolution must be divisible by 16. In the case of the 16:9 ratio, with 240 pixels high, the horizontal resolution should be 240 / 9 × 16 = 426.6̅ (426 2/3), the closest multiple of 16 is 432.

WQVGA has also been used to describe other resolutions with a similar height, such as 480 × 270 or 480 × 272. WQVGA resolutions were commonly used in touchscreen mobile phones, such as 400 × 240, 432 × 240, and 480 × 240. For example, the Hyundai MB 490i, Sony Ericsson Aino and the Samsung Instinct have WQVGA screen resolutions – 240 × 432. Other devices such as the Apple iPod Nano also use a WQVGA screen, 240 × 376 pixels. The Nintendo 3DS line is probably the most famous device to have a WQVGA screen.

=== 480 × 320 (HVGA) ===
HVGA and similar display resolutions
Name	H (px)	V (px)	H:V	H × V (Mpx)	VESA	Sources
—N/a	640	240	8:3	0.154	0.15M06	
—N/a	480	270	16:9	0.130	129.60K9	
—N/a	480	272	≈16:9	0.131	130.56K9	
HVGA	480	320	3:2	0.154	0.15M2	
—N/a	480	360	4:3	0.173	0.17M3	

HVGA (Half-size VGA) screens have 480 × 320 pixels (3:2 aspect ratio), 480 × 360 pixels (4:3 aspect ratio), 480 × 272 (≈16:9 aspect ratio), or 640 × 240 pixels (8:3 aspect ratio). The former is used by a variety of PDA devices, starting with the Sony CLIÉ PEG-NR70 in 2002, and standalone PDAs by Palm. The latter was used by a variety of handheld PC devices. VGA resolution is 640 × 480.

Examples of devices that use HVGA include the Apple iPhone (1st generation through 3GS), iPod Touch (1st Generation through 3rd), BlackBerry Bold 9000, HTC Dream, Hero, Wildfire S, LG GW620 Eve, MyTouch 3G Slide, Nokia 6260 Slide, Palm Pre, Samsung M900 Moment, Sony Ericsson Xperia X8, mini, mini pro, active and live and the Sony PlayStation Portable.

Texas Instruments produces the DLP pico projector which supports HVGA resolution.

HVGA was the only resolution supported in the first versions of Google Android, up to release 1.5. Other higher and lower resolutions became available starting on release 1.6, like the popular WVGA resolution on the Motorola Droid or the QVGA resolution on the HTC Tattoo.

Three-dimensional computer graphics common on television throughout the 1980s were mostly rendered at this resolution, causing objects to have jagged edges on the top and bottom when edges were not anti-aliased.

=== 640 × 480 (VGA) ===
Video Graphics Array (VGA) refers specifically to the display hardware first introduced with the IBM PS/2 line of computers in 1987. Through its widespread adoption, VGA has also come to mean either an analog computer display standard, the 15-pin D-subminiature VGA connector, or the 640 × 480 resolution itself. While the VGA resolution was superseded in the personal computer market in the 1990s and the SEGA Dreamcast in 1998, it became a popular resolution on mobile devices in the 2000s. VGA is still the universal fallback troubleshooting mode in the case of trouble with graphic device drivers in operating systems.

In the field of video, the resolution of 480i supports 640 samples per line (corresponding to 640 × 480) corresponding to Standard Definition (SD), in contrast to high-definition (HD) resolutions like 1280 × 720 and 1920 × 1080.

=== 800 × 480 (WVGA) ===
WVGA and similar display resolutions
Name	H (px)	V (px)	H:V	H × V (Mpx)	VESA	Sources
—N/a	640	384	15:9	0.246	0.25M6	
—N/a	800	450	16:9	0.360	0.36M9	
—N/a	720	480	15:10	0.346	0.35M2	
—N/a	768	480	16:10	0.369	0.37MA	
WVGA	800	480	15:9	0.384	0.38M6	
WVGA	848	480	≈16:9	0.407	0.41M9	
WVGA	852	480	≈16:9	0.409	0.41M9	
—N/a	853	480	≈16:9	0.409	0.41M9	
FWVGA	854	480	≈16:9	0.410	0.41M9	

Wide VGA or WVGA, sometimes just WGA are some display resolutions with the same 480-pixel height as VGA but wider, such as 720 × 480 (3:2 aspect ratio), 800 × 480 (5:3), 848 × 480, 852 × 480, 853 × 480, or 854 × 480 (≈16:9). It was a common resolution among LCD projectors and later portable and hand-held internet-enabled devices (such as MID and Netbooks) as it is capable of rendering websites designed for an 800 wide window in full page-width. Examples of hand-held internet devices, without phone capability, with this resolution include: Spice stellar nhance mi-435, ASUS Eee PC 700 series, Dell XCD35, Nokia 770, N800, and N810.

=== 854 × 480 (FWVGA) ===
FWVGA is an abbreviation for Full Wide Video Graphics Array which refers to a display resolution of 854 × 480 pixels. 854 × 480 is approximately the 16:9 aspect ratio of anamorphically "un-squeezed" NTSC DVD widescreen video and is considered a "safe" resolution that does not crop any of the image. It is called Full WVGA to distinguish it from other, narrower WVGA resolutions which require cropping 16:9 aspect ratio high-definition video (i.e. it is full width, albeit with a considerable reduction in size).

The 854 pixel width is rounded up from 853.3̅:

480 × 16/9 = 7680/9 = 853 1/3.

Since a pixel must be a whole number, rounding up to 854 ensures inclusion of the entire image. 853 × 480 is the 16:9 equivalent for NTSC (480 lines) on a display with square pixels. Plasma and other digital TV sets with this resolution were marketed as enhanced-definition television (EDTV) at the time.

In 2010, mobile phones with FWVGA display resolution started to become more common. (See also: list of mobile phones with FWVGA display.) In addition, the Wii U GamePad for Nintendo's Wii U gaming console includes a 6.2-inch FWVGA display.

=== 800 × 600 (SVGA) ===
Super Video Graphics Array, abbreviated to Super VGA or SVGA, also known as Ultra Video Graphics Array early on, abbreviated to Ultra VGA or UVGA, is a broad term that covers a wide range of computer display standards.

Originally, it was an extension to the VGA standard first released by IBM in 1987. Unlike VGA – a purely IBM-defined standard – Super VGA was defined by the Video Electronics Standards Association (VESA), an open consortium set up to promote interoperability and define standards. When used as a resolution specification, in contrast to VGA or XGA for example, the term SVGA normally refers to a resolution of 800 × 600 pixels.

The marginally higher resolution 832 × 624 is the highest 4:3 resolution that is not greater than 2^{19} pixels while also having a horizontal dimension that is a multiple of 32 pixels. The pixel count limit enables it to fit within a framebuffer of 512 KB (512 × 2^{10} bytes), and the common multiple of 32 pixels is related to data structure alignment. For these reasons, this resolution was available on the Macintosh LC III and other systems.

=== 1024 × 576, 1024 × 600 (WSVGA) ===
The wide version of SVGA is known as WSVGA (Wide Super VGA or Wide SVGA), featured on Ultra-Mobile PCs, netbooks, and tablet computers. The resolution is either 1024 × 576 (aspect ratio 16:9) or 1024 × 600 (128:75) with screen sizes normally ranging from 7 to 10 inches. It has full XGA width of 1024 pixels. Although digital broadcast content in former PAL/SECAM regions has 576 active lines, several mobile TV sets with a DVB-T2 tuner use the 600-line variant with a diameter of 7, 9 or 10 inches (18 to 26 cm).

1024 × 576 is the 16:9 equivalent for PAL (576 lines) on a display with square pixels, resulting in a pixel aspect ratio of 16∶11 or 64∶45 depending on the native resolution of PAL.

=== 960 × 640 ===
DVGA (DoubleVGA) screens have 960 × 640 pixels (3:2 aspect ratio). Both dimensions are double that of HVGA, hence the pixel count is quadrupled.

Examples of devices that use DVGA include the Meizu MX mobile phone and the Apple iPhone 4 and 4S with the iPod Touch 4, where the screen is called the "Retina Display". iPhone 5 introduced a wide, 16:9 variant at 1136 × 640 pixels, which also has no official acronym.

=== 1280 × 960 (QuadVGA) ===
QuadVGA (also labelled as Quad VGA or Quad-VGA) is a non-standard term used to refer to a resolution of 1280 × 960, since both sides are doubled from VGA. However, it is usually not as the abbreviation QVGA because this is strongly associated with the alternate meaning Quarter VGA (QVGA 320 × 240).

It is sometimes unofficially called SXGA− to avoid confusion with the SXGA standard (1280 × 1024). Elsewhere, this 4:3 resolution was supposedly also called UVGA (Ultra VGA), or SXVGA (Super eXtended VGA).

== Extended Graphics Array (XGA and derivatives) ==
XGA-based display resolutions
Name	H (px)	V (px)	H:V	H × V (Mpx)	VESA	Sources
XGA	1024	768	4:3	0.786	0.79M3	
WXGA	1366	768	≈16:9	1.049	1.05M9	(FWXGA)
WXGA	1280	800	16:10	1.024	1.02MA	
XGA+	1152	864	4:3	0.995	1.00M3	
WXGA+	1440	900	16:10	1.296	1.30MA	(WXGA)
SXGA	1280	1024	5:4	1.311	1.31M4	
WSXGA	1600	1024	25:16	1.638	1.64M0	
SXGA+	1400	1050	4:3	1.470	1.47M3	
WSXGA+	1680	1050	16:10	1.764	1.76MA	
QWXGA	2048	1152	16:9	2.359	2.36M9	
UXGA	1600	1200	4:3	1.920	1.92M3	
WUXGA	1920	1200	16:10	2.304	2.30MA	(FHD+)
QXGA	2048	1536	4:3	3.146	3.15M3	
WQXGA	2560	1600	16:10	4.096	4.10MA	
WQXGA+	2880	1800	16:10	5.184	5.18MA	
QSXGA	2560	2048	5:4	5.243	5.24M4	
WQSXGA	3200	2048	25:16	6.554	6.55M0	
QSXGA+	2800	2100	4:3	5.880	5.88M3	
QUXGA	3200	2400	4:3	7.680	7.68M3	
WQUXGA	3840	2400	16:10	9.216	9.22MA	(UHD+)

=== 1024 × 768 (XGA) ===
XGA logo used internally within IBM, designed by Paul Rand

The Extended Graphics Array (XGA) or originally Extended Video Graphics Array (Extended-VGA, EVGA) is an IBM display standard introduced in 1990. Later it became the most common appellation of the 1024 × 768 pixels display resolution.

The initial version of XGA expanded upon IBM's older VGA by adding support for four new screen modes, including one new resolution:

- 640 × 480 pixels in direct 16 bits-per-pixel (65,536 color) RGB hi-color and 8 bit/px (256 color) palette-indexed mode.
- 1024 × 768 pixels with a 16- or 256-color (4 or 8 bit/px) palette, using a low frequency interlaced refresh rate.

XGA-2 added a 24-bit DAC, but this was used only to extend the available master palette in 256-color mode, e.g. to allow true 256-greyscale output. Other improvements included the provision of the previously missing 800 × 600 resolution in up to 65,536 colors, faster screen refresh rates in all modes (including non-interlace, flicker-free output for 1024 × 768), and improved accelerator performance and versatility.

All standard XGA modes have a 4:3 aspect ratio with square pixels, although this does not hold for certain standard VGA and third-party extended modes (640 × 400, 1280 × 1024).

=== WXGA ===
WXGA and similar display resolutions
Name	H (px)	V (px)	H:V	H × V (Mpx)	VESA	Source
—N/a	1280	720	16:9	0.922	0.92M9	
—N/a	1152	768	3:2	0.885	0.88M2	
WXGA	1280	768	15:9	0.983	0.98M6	
FWXGA	1360	768	≈16:9	1.044	1.04M9	
WXGA (FWXGA)	1366	768	≈16:9	1.049	1.05M9	
WXGA	1280	800	16:10	1.024	1.02MA	

Wide XGA (WXGA) is a set of non-standard resolutions derived from XGA (1024 × 768) by widening it to 1366 × 768 with a widescreen aspect ratio of nearly 16:9 or to 1280 × 800 with an aspect ratio of 16:10. WXGA is commonly used for low-end LCD TVs and LCD computer monitors for widescreen presentation. The exact resolution offered by a device described as "WXGA" can be somewhat variable owing to a proliferation of several closely related timings optimised for different uses and derived from different bases.

In Microsoft Windows operating system specifically, the larger taskbar of Windows 7 occupies an additional 16-pixel lines by default, which may compromise the usability of programs that already demanded a full 1024 × 768 (instead of, e.g. 800 × 600) unless it is specifically set to use small icons; an "oddball" 784-line resolution would compensate for this, but 1280 × 800 has a simpler aspect and also gives the slight bonus of 16 more usable lines. Also, the Windows Sidebar in Windows Vista and 7 can use the additional 256 or 336 horizontal pixels to display informational "widgets" without compromising the display width of other programs, and Windows 8 was specifically designed around a "two-pane" concept where the full 16:9 or 16:10 screen is not required. Typically, this consists of a 4:3 main program area (typically 1024 × 768, 1000 × 800 or 1440 × 1080) plus a narrow sidebar running a second program, showing a toolbox for the main program or a pop-out OS shortcut panel taking up the remainder.

==== 1366 × 768 (WXGA) ====
When referring to televisions and other monitors intended for consumer entertainment use, WXGA is often understood to refer to a resolution of 1366 × 768, with an aspect ratio of very nearly 16:9. The basis for this otherwise odd seeming resolution is similar to that of other "wide" standards – the line scan (refresh) rate of the well-established "XGA" standard (1024 × 768 pixels, 4:3 aspect ratio) extended to give square pixels on the increasingly popular 16:9 widescreen display ratio without having to effect major signalling changes other than a faster pixel clock, or manufacturing changes other than extending panel width by one third. As 768 is not divisible by 9, the aspect ratio is not exactly 16:9 – this would require a width of 1365 1/3 (1365.3̅) pixels. However, at only 0.05%, the resulting error is insignificant. It is also occasionally referred to as FWXGA (Full Wide XGA), so it can be distinguished from other, narrower WXGA resolutions.

Following the introduction of the European HD ready logo in 2005, a year later 1366 × 768 was the most popular resolution for liquid crystal display televisions (versus XGA for Plasma TVs flat panel displays); By 2013, even this was relegated to only being used in smaller or cheaper displays (e.g. "bedroom" LCD TVs, or low-cost, large-format plasmas), cheaper laptop and mobile tablet computers, and midrange home cinema projectors, having otherwise been overtaken by higher "full HD" resolutions such as 1920 × 1080.

A common variant on this resolution is also 1360 × 768 (unnamed or named FWXGA), which confers several technical benefits, most significantly a reduction in memory requirements from just over to just under 1 MB per 8-bit channel (1366 × 768 needs 1024.5 KB per channel; 1360 × 768 needs 1020 KB; 1 MB is equal to 1024 KB), which simplifies architecture and can significantly reduce the amount–and speed–of VRAM required with only a very minor change in available resolution, as memory chips are usually only available in fixed megabyte capacities. For example, at 32-bit color, a 1360 × 768 framebuffer would require only 4 MB, whilst a 1366 × 768 one may need 5, 6, or even 8 MB depending on the exact display circuitry architecture and available chip capacities. The 6-pixel reduction also means each line's width is divisible by 8 pixels, simplifying numerous routines used in both computer and broadcast/theatrical video processing, which operate on 8-pixel blocks. Historically, many video cards also mandated screen widths divisible by 8 for their lower-color, planar modes to accelerate memory accesses and simplify pixel position calculations (e.g. fetching 4-bit pixels from 32-bit memory is much faster when performed 8 pixels at a time, and calculating exactly where a particular pixel is within a memory block is much easier when lines do not end partway through a memory word), and this convention persisted in low-end hardware even into the early days of widescreen, LCD HDTVs; thus, most 1366-width displays also quietly support display of 1360-width material, with a thin border of unused pixel columns at each side. This narrower mode is even further removed from the 16:9 ideal, but the error is still less than 0.5% (technically, the mode is either 15.94:9.00 or 16.00:9.04) and should be imperceptible.

==== 1280 × 800 (WXGA) ====
When referring to laptop displays or independent displays and projectors intended primarily for use with computers, WXGA is also used to describe a resolution of 1280 × 800 pixels, with an aspect ratio of 16:10. This was once particularly popular for laptop screens, usually with a diagonal screen size of between 12 and 15 inches, as it provided a useful compromise between 4:3 XGA and 16:9 WXGA, with improved resolution in both dimensions vs. the old standard (especially useful in portrait mode, or for displaying two standard pages of text side by side), a perceptibly "wider" appearance and the ability to display 720p HD video "native" with only very thin letterbox borders (usable for on-screen playback controls) and no stretching. Additionally, it required only 1000 KB (just under 1 MB) of memory per 8-bit channel; thus, a typical double-buffered 32-bit color screen could fit within 8 MB, limiting everyday demands on the complexity (and cost, energy use) of integrated graphics chipsets and their shared use of typically sparse system memory (generally allocated to the video system in relatively large blocks), at least when only the internal display was in use (external monitors generally being supported in "extended desktop" mode to at least 1600 × 1200 resolution). 16:10 (or 8:5) is itself a rather "classic" computer aspect ratio, harking back to early 320 × 200 modes (and their derivatives) as seen in the Commodore 64, IBM CGA card and others. However, as of mid-2013, this standard is becoming increasingly rare, crowded out by the more standardized and thus more economical-to-produce 1366 × 768 panels, as its previously beneficial features become less important with improvements to hardware, gradual loss of general backwards software compatibility, and changes in interface layout. As of February 2024, the market availability of panels with 1280 × 800 native resolution had been generally relegated to handheld gaming computers 1280 × 800 is used by Valve's Steam Deck, as well as several other handheld gaming computers.

==== Other WXGA ====
Additionally, at least three other resolutions are sometimes labelled as WXGA:

- The first variant, 1280 × 768, can be seen as a compromise resolution that addressed this problem, as well as a halfway point between the older 1024 × 768 and 1280 × 1024 resolutions, and a stepping stone to 1366 × 768 (being one-quarter wider than 1024, not one-third) and 1280 × 800, that never quite caught on in the same way as either of its arguably derivative successors. Its square-pixel aspect ratio is 15:9 (or 5:3), in contrast to HDTV's 16:9 and 1280 × 800's 16:10. It is also the lowest resolution that might be found in an "Ultrabook" standard laptop, as it satisfies the minimum horizontal and vertical pixel resolutions required to officially qualify for the designation.
- Second, the HDTV-standard 1280 × 720 (otherwise commonly described as "720p"), which offers an exact 16:9 aspect ratio with square pixels; naturally, it displays standard 720p HD video material without stretching or letterboxing and 1080i/1080p with a simple 2:3 downscale. This resolution has found some use in tablets and modern, high-pixel-density mobile phones, as well as small-format "netbook" or "ultralight" laptop computers. However, its use is uncommon in larger, mainstream devices as it has an insufficient vertical resolution for the proper use of modern operating systems such as Windows 7 whose UI design assumes a minimum of 768 lines. For certain uses such as word processing, it can even be considered a slight downgrade (reducing the number of simultaneously visible lines of text without granting any significant benefit as even 640 pixels is sufficient horizontal resolution to legibly render a full page width, especially with the addition of subpixel anti-aliasing).
- Another mentionable resolution is 1152 × 768 with a 3:2 aspect ratio.
- Likewise, 1344 × 768 with a 7:4 aspect ratio (similar to 16:9) is used sometimes.
- Some 1440 × 900 resolution displays have also been found labeled as WXGA; however, the "correct" label is WXGA+.

=== 1152 × 864 (XGA+) ===
XGA+ and similar display resolutions
Name	H (px)	V (px)	H:V	H × V (Mpx)	VESA	Usage
—N/a	1120	832	35:26 (≈1.35)	0.932	0.93M3	NeXT
XGA+	1152	864	4:3 (1.3̅)	0.995	1.00M3	
—N/a	1152	870	192:145 (≈1.32)	1.002	1.00M3	Apple
—N/a	1152	900	32:25 (1.28)	1.037	1.04M4	Sun

XGA+ stands for Extended Graphics Array Plus and is a computer display standard, usually understood to refer to the 1152 × 864 resolution with an aspect ratio of 4:3. Until the advent of widescreen LCDs, XGA+ was often used on 17-inch desktop CRT monitors. It is the highest 4:3 resolution not greater than 2^{20} pixels (≈1.05 megapixels), with its horizontal dimension a multiple of 32 pixels. This enables it to fit closely into a video memory or framebuffer of 1 MB (1 × 2^{20} bytes), assuming the use of one byte per pixel. The common multiple of 32 pixels constraint is related to alignment.

Historically, the resolution also relates to the earlier standard of 1152 × 900 pixels, which was adopted by Sun Microsystems for the Sun-2 workstation in the early 1980s. A decade later, Apple Computer selected the resolution of 1152 × 870 for their 21-inch CRT monitors, intended for use as two-page displays on the Macintosh II computer. These resolutions are even closer to the limit of a 1 MB framebuffer, but their aspect ratios differ slightly from the common 4:3.

=== 1440 × 900 (WXGA+, WSXGA) ===
WXGA+ and WSXGA are terms referring to a computer display resolution of 1440 × 900. Occasionally manufacturers use other terms to refer to this resolution. The Standard Panels Working Group refers to the 1440 × 900 resolution as WXGA (but refers also WXGA to 1280 × 800).

WXGA+ can be considered enhanced versions of WXGA with more pixels. The aspect ratio is 16:10 (widescreen). WXGA+ resolution is common in 19-inch widescreen desktop monitors (a very small number of such monitors use WSXGA+), and is also optional, although less common, in laptop LCDs, in sizes ranging from 12.1 to 17 inches.

==== 1600 × 1024 ====
The name WSXGA is also used to describe a resolution of 1600 × 1024, which has an aspect ratio of 25:16 (5^{2}:4^{2} = 1.5625) which is between 3:2 and 16:10.

This resolution has the width of UXGA and the height of SXGA.

==== 1440 × 960 ====
The name WSXGA is also used to describe a resolution of 1440 × 960, with aspect ratio 3:2 (which is between 4:3 and 16:10).

==== 1280 × 854 ====
The name WXGA+ has also been used to refer to a resolution of 1280 × 854, which has an aspect ratio extremely close to 3:2.

=== 1280 × 1024 (SXGA) ===
Super XGA (SXGA) is a standard monitor resolution of 1280 × 1024 pixels. This display resolution is the "next step" above the XGA resolution that IBM developed in 1990.

The 1280 × 1024 resolution is not the standard 4:3 aspect ratio, instead it is a 5:4 aspect ratio (1.25:1 instead of 1.3̅:1). A standard 4:3 monitor using this resolution will have rectangular rather than square pixels, meaning that unless the software compensates for this the picture will be distorted, causing circles to appear elliptical.

SXGA is the most common native resolution of 17-inch and 19-inch LCD monitors. An LCD monitor with SXGA native resolution will typically have a physical 5:4 aspect ratio, preserving a 1:1 pixel aspect ratio.

SXGA is also a popular resolution for cell phone cameras, such as the Motorola Razr and most Samsung and LG phones. Although having been taken over by newer UXGA (2.0-megapixel) cameras, the 1.3-megapixel was the most common around 2007.

Any CRT that can run 1280 × 1024 can also run 1280 × 960 (QuadVGA or sometimes SXGA-), which has the standard 4:3 ratio. A flat panel TFT screen, including one designed for 1280 × 1024, will show stretching distortion when set to display any resolution other than its native one, as the image needs to be interpolated to fit in the fixed grid display. Some TFT displays do not allow a user to disable this, and will prevent the upper and lower portions of the screen from being used forcing a "letterbox" format when set to a 4:3 ratio.

The 1280 × 1024 resolution became popular because at 24 bit/px color depth it fits well into 4 megabytes of video RAM. At the time, memory was extremely expensive. Using 1280 × 1024 at 24-bit color depth allowed using 3.75 MB of video RAM, fitting nicely with VRAM chip sizes which were available at the time (4 MB):

(1280 × 1024) px × 24 bit/px ÷ 8 bit/byte ÷ 2^{20} byte/MB = 3.75 MB

=== 1400 × 1050 (SXGA+) ===
SXGA+ stands for Super Extended Graphics Array Plus and is a computer display standard. An SXGA+ display is commonly used on 14-inch or 15-inch laptop LCD screens with a resolution of 1400 × 1050 pixels. An SXGA+ display is used on a few 12-inch laptop screens such as the ThinkPad X60 and X61 (both only as tablet) as well as the Toshiba Portégé M200 and M400, but those are far less common. At 14.1 inches, Dell offered SXGA+ on many of the Latitude C-Series laptops, such as the C640, and IBM since the ThinkPad T21. Sony also used SXGA+ in their Z1 series, but no longer produces them as widescreen has become more predominant.

In desktop LCDs, SXGA+ is used on some low-end 20-inch monitors, whereas most of the 20-inch LCDs use UXGA (standard screen ratio), or WSXGA+ (widescreen ratio).

A rare resolution of 2800 × 2100, i.e. with double the pixels horizontally and vertically, is known as QSXGA+.

=== 1680 × 1050 (WSXGA+) ===
WSXGA+ stands for Widescreen Super Extended Graphics Array Plus. WSXGA+ displays were commonly used on Widescreen 20-, 21-, and 22-inch LCD monitors from numerous manufacturers (and a very small number of 19-inch widescreen monitors), as well as widescreen 15.4-inch and 17-inch laptop LCD screens like the Thinkpad T61p, the late 17" Apple PowerBook G4 and the unibody Apple 15" MacBook Pro. The resolution is 1680 × 1050 pixels (1,764,000 pixels) with a 16:10 aspect ratio.

=== 1600 × 1200 (UXGA) ===
UXGA is an abbreviation for Ultra Extended Graphics Array referring to a standard monitor resolution of 1600 × 1200 pixels (totaling 1,920,000 pixels), which is exactly four times the default image resolution of SVGA (800 × 600) (totaling 480,000 pixels). Dell Inc. refers to the same resolution of 1,920,000 pixels as UGA. It is generally considered to be the next step above SXGA (1280 × 960 or 1280 × 1024), but some resolutions (such as the unnamed 1366 × 1024 and SXGA+ at 1400 × 1050) fit between the two.

UXGA has been the native resolution of many fullscreen monitors of 15 inches or more, including laptop LCDs such as the ones in the IBM ThinkPad A21p, A30p, A31p, T42p, T43p, T60p, Dell Inspiron 8000/8100/8200 and Latitude/Precision equivalents; some Panasonic Toughbook CF-51 models; and the original Alienware Area 51M gaming laptop. However, in more recent times, UXGA is not used in laptops at all but rather in desktop monitors that have been made in sizes of 20 inches and 21.3 inches. Some 14-inch laptop LCDs with UXGA have also existed (such as the Dell Inspiron 4100), but these are very rare.

=== 1920 × 1200 (WUXGA) ===
WUXGA stands for Widescreen Ultra Extended Graphics Array and is a display resolution of 1920 × 1200 pixels (2,304,000 pixels) with a 16:10 screen aspect ratio. It is a wide version of UXGA. Some manufacturers refer to it as FHD+ because it is the next larger resolution in vertical direction after FHD (1920 × 1080). WUXGA/FHD+ can be used for viewing high-definition television (HDTV) content, which uses a 16:9 aspect ratio and a 1280 × 720 (720p) or 1920 × 1080 (1080i or 1080p) resolution.

The 16:10 aspect ratio (as opposed to the 16:9 used in widescreen televisions) was chosen because this aspect ratio is appropriate for displaying two full pages of text side by side.

WUXGA resolution has a total of 2,304,000 pixels. One frame of uncompressed 8 BPC RGB WUXGA is 6.75 MiB (6.912 MB). Initially, it was available in widescreen CRTs such as the Sony GDM-FW900 and the Hewlett-Packard A7217A (introduced in 2003), and in 17-inch laptops. Most QXGA displays support 1920 × 1200. WUXGA is also available in some mobile phablet devices such as the Huawei Honor X2 Gem.

=== 2048 × 1152 (QWXGA) ===
QWXGA (for Quad-WXGA or Quad Wide Extended Graphics Array) is a display resolution of 2048 × 1152 pixels with a 16:9 aspect ratio.

If taken as a starting point that WXGA has a display resolution of 1366 × 768 or 1280 × 800 a display with a size 4-times of WXGA should have 2732 × 1536 or 2560 × 1600 pixels, but the first is non-existent and the latter is named WQXGA. Conversely, the quarter of QWXGA (2048 × 1152) would have 1024 × 576 pixels but this is named WSVGA.

A few QWXGA LCD monitors were available in 2009 with 23- and 27-inch displays, such as the Acer B233HU (23-inch) and B273HU (27-inch), the Dell SP2309W, and the Samsung 2343BWX. As of 2011, most 2048 × 1152 monitors have been discontinued, and as of 2013, no major manufacturer produces monitors with this resolution.

=== 2048 × 1536 (QXGA) ===
QXGA (for Quad-XGA or Quad Extended Graphics Array) is a display resolution of 2048 × 1536 pixels with a 4:3 aspect ratio as XGA. The name comes from it having four times as many pixels as an XGA display of 1024 × 768.

Examples of LCDs with this resolution are the IBM T210 and the Eizo G33 and R31 screens, but in CRT monitors this resolution is much more common; some examples include the Sony F520, ViewSonic G225fB, NEC FP2141SB or Mitsubishi DP2070SB, Iiyama Vision Master Pro 514, and Dell and HP P1230. Of these monitors, none are still in production.

IDTech manufactured a 15-inch QXGA IPS panel, used in the IBM ThinkPad R50p. NEC sold laptops with QXGA screens in 2002–05 for the Japanese market. The iPad (from 3rd through 6th generation and Mini 2) also have a QXGA display.

=== 2560 × 1600 (WQXGA) ===
WQXGA (Wide Quad Extended Graphics Array) is a display resolution of 2560 × 1600 pixels with a 16:10 aspect ratio. The name implies a "wide QXGA" (QXGA 2048 × 1536) but instead WQXGA has exactly four times as many pixels as a WXGA (1280 × 800) hence the name "Quad-WXGA" would fit but QWXGA is defined as 2048 × 1152 pixels.

Some manufacturers refer to this resolution as QHD+ referring to QHD (2560 × 1440). (QHD+ is sometimes also used for the resolution 3200 × 1800 (QHD+).)

To obtain a vertical refresh rate higher than 40 Hz with DVI, this resolution requires dual-link DVI cables and devices. To avoid cable problems monitors are sometimes shipped with an appropriate dual link cable already plugged in. Many video cards support this resolution. One feature that was unique to the 30-inch WQXGA monitors is the ability to function as the centerpiece and main display of a three-monitor array of complementary aspect ratios, with two UXGA (1600 × 1200) 20-inch monitors turned vertically on either side. The resolutions are equal, and the size of the 1600 resolution edges is within a tenth of an inch (16-inch vs. 15.89999"), presenting a "picture window view" without the extreme lateral dimensions, small central panel, asymmetry, resolution differences, or dimensional difference of other three-monitor combinations. The resulting 4960 × 1600 composite image has a 3.1:1 aspect ratio. This also means one UXGA 20-inch monitor in portrait orientation can also be flanked by two 30-inch WQXGA monitors for a 6320 × 1600 composite image with an 11.85:3 (79:20, 3.95:1) aspect ratio.

An early consumer WQXGA monitor was the 30-inch Apple Cinema Display, unveiled by Apple in June 2004. At the time, dual-link DVI was uncommon on consumer hardware, so Apple partnered with Nvidia to develop a special graphics card that had two dual-link DVI ports, allowing simultaneous use of two 30-inch Apple Cinema Displays. The nature of this graphics card, being an add-in AGP card, meant that the monitors could only be used in a desktop computer, like the Power Mac G5, that could have the add-in card installed, and could not be immediately used with laptop computers that lacked this expansion capability.

In March 2009, Apple updated several Macintosh computers with a Mini DisplayPort adapter, such as the Mac mini and iMac. These allow an external connection to a 2560 × 1600 display.

In 2010, WQXGA made its debut in a handful of home theater projectors targeted at the Constant Height Screen application market. Both Digital Projection Inc and projectiondesign released models based on a Texas Instruments DLP chip with a native WQXGA resolution, alleviating the need for an anamorphic lens to achieve 1:2.35 image projection. Many manufacturers have 27–30-inch models that are capable of WQXGA, albeit at a much higher price than lower resolution monitors of the same size. Several mainstream WQXGA monitors are or were available with 30-inch displays, such as the Dell 3007WFP-HC, 3008WFP, U3011, U3014, UP3017, the Hewlett-Packard LP3065, the Gateway XHD3000, LG W3000H, and the Samsung 305T. Specialist manufacturers like NEC, Eizo, Planar Systems, Barco (LC-3001), and possibly others offer similar models. As of 2016, LG Display make a 10-bit 30-inch AH-IPS panel, with wide color gamut, used in monitors from Dell, NEC, HP, Lenovo and Iiyama.

Released in November 2012, Google's Nexus 10 is the first consumer tablet to feature WQXGA resolution. Before its release, the highest resolution available on a tablet was QXGA (2048 × 1536), available on the Apple iPad 3rd and 4th generations devices. Several Samsung Galaxy tablets, including the Note 10.1 (2014 Edition), Tab S 8.4, 10.5 and TabPRO 8.4, 10.1 and Note Pro 12.2, as well as the Gigaset QV1030, also feature a WQXGA resolution display.

In 2012, Apple released the 13 inch MacBook Pro with Retina Display that features a WQXGA display, and the new MacBook Air in 2018.

The LG Gram 17 introduced in 2019 uses a 17-inch WQXGA display.

=== 2560 × 2048 (QSXGA) ===
QSXGA (Quad Super Extended Graphics Array) is a display resolution of 2560 × 2048 pixels with a 5:4 aspect ratio. Grayscale monitors with a 2560 × 2048 resolution, primarily for medical use, are available from Planar Systems (Dome E5), Eizo (Radiforce G51), Barco (Nio 5, MP), WIDE (IF2105MP), IDTech (IAQS80F), and possibly others.

Recent medical displays such as Barco Coronis Fusion 10MP or NDS Dome S10 have a native panel resolution of 4096 × 2560. These are driven by two dual-link DVI or DisplayPort outputs. They can be considered to be two seamless virtual QSXGA displays as they have to be driven simultaneously by both dual-link DVI or DisplayPort since one dual-link DVI or DisplayPort cannot single-handedly display 10 megapixels. A similar resolution of 2560 × 1920 (4:3) was supported by a small number of CRT displays via VGA such as the Viewsonic P225f when paired with the right graphics card.

=== 2880 × 1800 (WQXGA+) ===
This resolution is double the dimensions of WXGA+ 1440 × 900. It is sometimes referred to as "WQXGA+". This resolution was first used on the Apple MacBook Pro Retina in 2012.

=== 3200 × 2048 (WQSXGA) ===
WQSXGA (Wide Quad Super Extended Graphics Array) describes a display standard that can support a resolution up to 3200 × 2048 pixels, assuming a 25:16 (1.5625:1) aspect ratio. The Coronis Fusion 6MP DL by Barco supports a slightly wider 3280 × 2048 (approximately 16:10).

=== 3200 × 2400 (QUXGA) ===
QUXGA (Quad Ultra Extended Graphics Array) describes a display standard that can support a resolution up to 3200 × 2400 pixels, assuming a 4:3 aspect ratio.

=== 3840 × 2400 (WQUXGA) ===
WQUXGA (Wide Quad Ultra Extended Graphics Array) describes a display standard that supports a resolution of 3840 × 2400 pixels, which provides a 16:10 aspect ratio. This resolution is exactly four times 1920 × 1200 pixels (WUXGA).

Some manufacturers refer to this resolution as UHD+ because it has some additional lines compared to UHD (3840 × 2160).

Most display cards with a DVI connector are capable of supporting the 3840 × 2400 resolution. However, the maximum refresh rate will be limited by the number of DVI links connected to the monitor. One, two, or four DVI connectors are used to drive the monitor using various tile configurations. Only the IBM T221-DG5 and IDTech MD22292B5 support the use of dual-link DVI ports through an external converter box. Many systems using these monitors use at least two DVI connectors to send video to the monitor. These DVI connectors can be from the same graphics card, different graphics cards, or even different computers. Motion across the tile boundary(ies) can show tearing if the DVI links are not synchronized. The display panel can be updated at a speed between 0 Hz and 41 Hz (48 Hz for the IBM T221-DG5, -DGP, and IDTech MD22292B5). The refresh rate of the video signal can be higher than 41 Hz (or 48 Hz) but the monitor will not update the display any faster even if graphics card(s) do so.

In June 2001, WQUXGA was introduced in the IBM T220 LCD monitor using a LCD panel built by IDTech. LCD displays that support WQUXGA resolution include: IBM T220, IBM T221, Iiyama AQU5611DTBK, ViewSonic VP2290, ADTX MD22292B, and IDTech MD22292 (models B0, B1, B2, B5, C0, C2). IDTech was the original equipment manufacturer which sold these monitors to ADTX, IBM, Iiyama, and ViewSonic. However, none of the WQUXGA monitors (IBM, ViewSonic, Iiyama, ADTX) are in production anymore: they had prices that were well above even the higher end displays used by graphic professionals, and the lower refresh rates, 41 Hz and 48 Hz, made them less attractive for many applications.

== Unsystematic resolutions ==
(Ultra) wide smartphone display resolutions
H (px)	V (px)	H:V	H × V (Mpx)	Usage
1136	640	16∶9	0.727	Apple
1334	750	16∶9	1.000	Apple
1792	828	19½∶9	1.484	Apple
2160	1080	2∶1	2.333	Android
2220	1080	18½∶9	2.400	Android
2280	1080	19∶9	2.462	Android
2340	1080	19½∶9	2.527	Android, Apple
2400	1080	20∶9	2.592	Android
2436	1125	19½∶9	2.741	Apple
2532	1170	19½∶9	2.962	Apple
2556	1179	19½∶9	3.014	Apple
2688	1242	19½∶9	3.338	Apple
2778	1284	19½∶9	3.567	Apple
2796	1290	19½∶9	3.607	Apple
2960	1440	18½∶9	4.262	Android
3040	1440	19∶9	4.378	Android
3120	1440	19½∶9	4.493	Android

Some hardware devices, smartphones in particular, use non-standard resolutions for their displays. Still, their aspect ratio or one of the dimensions is often derived from one of the standards. Many of them have bend edges, rounded corners, notches or islands for sensors, which may make some pixels invisible or unused.

After having used VGA-based 3∶2 resolutions HVGA (480 × 320) and "Retina" DVGA (960 × 640) for several years in their iPhone and iPod products with a screen diagonal of 9 cm or 3.5 inches, Apple started using more exotic variants when they adopted the 16∶9 aspect ratio to provide a consistent pixel density across screen sizes: first 1136 × 640 with the iPhone 5(c/s) and SE 1st for 10 cm or 4 inch screens, and later the 1-megapixel resolution of 1334 × 750 with the iPhone 6 (s)/7/8 and SE 2nd/3rd for 12 cm or 4.7 inch screens, while devices with 14 cm or 5.5 inch screens used standard 1920 × 1080 with the iPhone 6 (s)/7/8 Plus.

Keeping the pixel density of previous models, the iPhone X (s) and 11 Pro introduced a 2436 × 1125 resolution for 15 cm or 5.8 inch screens, while the iPhone XS Max and 11 Pro Max introduced a 2688 × 1242 resolution for 17 cm or 6.5 inch screens (with a notch) all at an aspect ratio of roughly 13∶6 or, for marketing, 19.5∶9. Subsequent Apple smartphones and phablets stayed with that aspect ratio but increased screen size slightly with approximately constant pixel density. The resulting resolutions have longer sides divisible by 6 and hardly rounded shorter sides: 1792 × 828 (iPhone 11, Xr), 2532 × 1170 (12/13 (Pro), 14), 2556 × 1179 (14 (Pro), 15 Pro), 2778 × 1284 (12/13 Pro Max, 14 Plus), 2796 × 1290 (14/15 Pro Max, 15 Plus). The only Apple smartphone models that shared an ultra-wide 19½∶9 resolution with Android phones were the iPhone 12/13 Mini with 2340 × 1080.

Other manufacturers have also introduced phones with irregular display resolutions and aspect ratios, such as Samsung's various "Infinity" displays with 37∶18 = 18½∶9 aspect ratios (Galaxy S8/S9 and A8/A9) at resolutions of 2960 × 1440 and 2220 × 1080. The resolution 2160 × 1080 is used by many smartphones since 2018. It has an aspect ratio of 18:9, matching that of the Univisium film format. Other phones feature an 19∶9 aspect ratio with resolutions like 3040 × 1440 (e.g. S10) and 2280 × 1080 (S10e). Even wider resolutions with the same aspect ratio of 19½∶9 as iPhones are 3120 × 1440 (e.g. S24+) or 2340 × 1080 (Poco M3). Some phones have an aspect ratio of 20∶9 at resolutions like 2400 × 1080 (e.g. S10 Lite) and 3200 × 1440 (e.g. S20).

Phones with foldable displays, e.g. Samsung Galaxy Z series, usually have non-systematic resolutions and aspect ratios, which are either roughly square when folded along the longer edge (Fold) or extremely tall when folded along the smaller edge (Flip).

Some air traffic control monitors use displays with a resolution of 2048 × 2048, with an aspect ratio of 1:1, and similar consumer monitors at resolution of 1920 × 1920 are also available aimed primarily at productivity tasks.

== See also ==
- Dot pitch
- List of common display resolutions
- Pixel density
- Ultrawide formats for history and comparison of video formats and displays, which are growing wider
