= List of Windows Phone 7 devices =

Devices that run Windows Phone 7

This page seeks to list and compare hardware devices that are shipped with Microsoft's Windows Phone 7 operating system. HTC Corporation, Samsung, LG, Dell, Fujitsu, Nokia, Acer, Alcatel and ZTE have all released Windows Phone-based devices.

Throughout its lifespan, Windows Phone 7 was shipped on 28 unique devices. This list contains devices that have been confirmed and officially announced by their manufacturers.

== Released ==
=== Windows Phone 7.0 ===
First generation devices come with Windows Phone 7 preinstalled and can be updated to Windows Phone 7.5 and 7.8 OS. All devices in this list feature a 1 GHz Scorpion single-core processor, 512 MB of RAM, a 480 x 800 WVGA resolution screen, a back camera of 5 megapixels and a built-in digital compass. The chipset used is the Snapdragon S1 QSD8250 on non-LG devices and the Snapdragon S1 QSD8650 on LG devices. There are two exceptions, however; the Dell Venue Pro does not feature a compass, while the HTC 7 Mozart includes an 8 MP back camera instead of 5 MP.

Product	Release date	Storage	Display	Keyboard
Dell Venue Pro	November 2010	8 or 16 GB	4.1" AMOLED	Yes
HTC 7 Pro (Arrive)	January 2011	8 or 16 GB	3.6" TN LCD	Yes
HTC 7 Surround	November 2010	16 GB	3.8" TN LCD	No
HTC 7 Trophy	October 2010	8 or 16 GB	3.8" Super LCD	No
HTC 7 Mozart	October 2010	8 or 16 GB	3.7" Super LCD	No
HTC HD7 (HD7S)	October 2010	8 or 16 GB	4.3" LCD (HD7S Super LCD)	No
LG Optimus 7 (Jil Sander Mobile)	October 2010	16 GB	3.8" TN LCD	No
LG Quantum (Optimus 7Q)	October 2010	16 GB	3.5" TN LCD	Yes
Samsung Focus	November 2010	8 or 16 GB, microSD	4.0" Super AMOLED	No
Samsung Omnia 7	October 2010	8 or 16 GB	4.0" Super AMOLED	No

=== Windows Phone 7.5 ===
Second generation Windows Phone comes pre-installed with the Windows Phone 7.5 "Mango" version of Windows Phone or later. All devices in this list feature a single-core processor, a 480 x 800 WVGA resolution screen, and (except for the HTC Radar) a built-in digital compass. Due to the change of requirements, some second generation devices have lower-speed processors or less than 512 MB of RAM.

Product	Release Date	CPU (GHz)	RAM	Storage	Display	Camera(s)		Gyroscope
Product	Release Date	CPU (GHz)	RAM	Storage	Display	Back	Front	Gyroscope
Acer Allegro	November 2011	MSM8255 (1.0)	512 MB	8 GB	3.6" TN LCD	5 MP	—	No
Alcatel One Touch View	December 2012	MSM7227A (1.0)	512 MB	4 GB	3.7" TN LCD	5 MP	0.3 MP	No
Fujitsu Toshiba IS12T	September 2011	MSM8655 (1.0)	512 MB	32 GB	3.7" TN LCD	13.2 MP	—	Yes
HTC Radar	October 2011	MSM8255 (1.0)	512 MB	8 GB	3.8" Super LCD	5 MP	0.3 MP	No
HTC Titan (Ultimate/Eternity)	October 2011	MSM8255T (1.5)	512 MB	16 GB	4.7" Super LCD	8 MP	1.3 MP	Yes
HTC Titan II	April 2012	MSM8255T (1.5)	512 MB	16 GB	4.7" Super LCD	16 MP	1.3 MP	Yes
Nokia Lumia 510	November 2012	MSM7227A (0.8)	256 MB	4 GB	4.0" TN LCD	5 MP	—	No
Nokia Lumia 610	April 2012	MSM7227A (0.8)	256 MB	8 GB	3.7" TN LCD	5 MP	—	No
Nokia Lumia 710	November 2011	MSM8255T (1.4)	512 MB	8 GB	3.7" ClearBlack LCD	5 MP	—	No
Nokia Lumia 800	November 2011	MSM8255T (1.4)	512 MB	16 GB	3.7" ClearBlack AMOLED	8 MP	—	No
Nokia Lumia 900	April 2012	APQ8055 (1.4)	512 MB	16 GB	4.3" ClearBlack AMOLED	8 MP	1.3 MP	Yes
Samsung Focus 2	May 2012	MSM8255T (1.4)	512 MB	8 GB	4.0" Super AMOLED	5 MP	0.3 MP	Yes
Samsung Focus S	November 2011	MSM8255T (1.4)	512 MB	16 GB	4.3" Super AMOLED Plus	8 MP	1.3 MP	Yes
Samsung Omnia M	May 2012	1.0 GHz	384 MB	4 GB; 8 GB	4.0" Super AMOLED	5 MP	0.3 MP	No
Samsung Omnia W (Focus Flash)	November 2011	MSM8255T (1.4)	512 MB	8 GB	3.7" Super AMOLED	5 MP	0.3 MP	Yes
ZTE Orbit (Render)	May 2012	MSM7227A (1.0)	512 MB	4 GB	4.0" TN LCD	5 MP	—	No
ZTE Tania (Spirit)	December 2011	MSM8255 (1.0)	256 MB	4 GB	4.3" TN LCD	5 MP	—	No

=== Windows Phone 7.8 ===
Third generation Windows Phone 7.8 update was announced by Microsoft as an alternative to Windows Phone 8. Existing 7.5 devices cannot be updated to WP8. Only one Windows Phone 7.8 device was announced.

Product	Release Date	CPU (GHz)	RAM	Storage	Display	Camera(s)		Gyroscope
Product	Release Date	CPU (GHz)	RAM	Storage	Display	Back	Front	Gyroscope
Nokia Lumia 505	December 2012	MSM7227A (0.8)	256 MB	4 GB	3.7" ClearBlack AMOLED	8 MP	—	No
