= Samsung Omnia Pro =

Samsung Omnia Pro may refer to:

== Mobile phones ==
- Samsung Omnia Pro B7320
- Samsung Omnia Pro B7330
- Samsung Omnia Pro B7610
