= Samsung Omnia Lite =

Cell phone model

Samsung B7300 Omnia Lite
- Manufacturer: Samsung
- Series: Samsung Omnia Series
- Availability by region: June 2009
- Compatible networks: AGPS, HSDPA (3.5G), Quad band GSM / GPRS / EDGE GSM 850, GSM 900, GSM 1800, GSM 1900
- Form factor: Candybar
- Dimensions: 112×56.9×12.5 mm (4.41×2.24×0.49 in)
- Weight: 127 g (4 oz)
- Operating system: Microsoft Windows Mobile 6.5 Professional
- CPU: SEC S3C6410 ARM11 800MHz
- Memory: 256 MB RAM, 512 MB ROM
- Storage: n/a
- Removable storage: MicroSD (TransFlash)
- Battery: Li-Ion (1500 mAh)
- Rear camera: 3 Megapixels (2048х1536) with AutoFocus, VGA(640x480)@15fps Video Recording, 2x digital zoom
- Front camera: 3G Video Calling (Front)
- Display: WQVGA 240x400 px (rotatable), 3.0 in, TFT LCD, Touch Screen
- Connectivity: USB 2.0, Bluetooth 2.0 with A2DP, Wi-Fi b/g,
- Data inputs: Touch Screen, Buttons

Samsung B7300 (marketed as OmniaLITE) is an entry-level Windows Mobile 6.5 smartphone from Samsung and is a part of their Omnia series of mobile phones. Announced in June 2009, the Omnia Lite was launched in June 2009. It is based on the original Omnia and the Tocco Ultra.
