= LG Optimus 7 =

Windows Phone-powered smartphone from LG

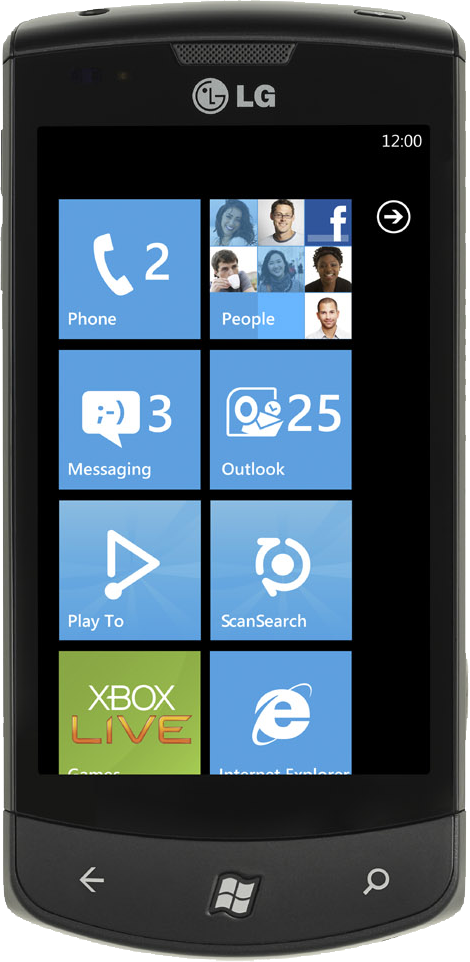
- Manufacturer: LG Electronics
- Series: Optimus
- Availability by region: November 2010
- Form factor: Slate smartphone
- Dimensions: 125×59.8×11.5 mm (4.92×2.35×0.45 in)
- Weight: 5.54 oz (157 g)
- Operating system: Windows Phone 7
- CPU: Qualcomm QSD8650 1GHz Scorpion (Snapdragon)
- Memory: 512 MB RAM
- Storage: 16 GB
- Battery: Li-Ion 1500 mAh
- Rear camera: 5 MP with autofocus 5× digital zoom LED Flash; 720p HD video recording
- Front camera: None
- Display: 3.8-inch (diagonal) widescreen 480-by-800 WVGA LCD TFT Capacitive Touchscreen
- Connectivity: Quad-band GSM/GPRS/EDGE (850 900 1800 1900 MHz); Tri-band UMTS/HSDPA (900 1900 2100 MHz); Wi-Fi (802.11 b/g/n); Bluetooth 2.1 + EDR; DLNA; A-GPS; FM radio
- Data inputs: Multi-touch touchscreen display Dual microphone 3-axis accelerometer Digital compass Proximity sensor Ambient light sensor
- Codename: Atlantic
- Development status: Available
- Test mode: ##634#

The LG Optimus 7 (also known as the LG-E900) is a slate smartphone which runs Microsoft's Windows Phone operating system. The Optimus 7 is part of the first-generation Windows Phone line-up launched in October 2010.

== Technical issues ==
=== Update issues ===
Several users reported an error while updating their handsets to Windows Phone 7.5 via Zune which only seemed to affect users with firmware versions 1.0.1.12 and 1.1.2.10. Newer versions of the firmware do not seem to have this problem. Certain users have reported the error has been removed after re-flashing their device ROM via an Authorised LG Support Center or restoring the previous version of their device and updating to Mango again.

=== Overheating ===
The Optimus 7 has a tendency to heat to a high temperature when the handset is left to run an application for an extended period of time. This behavior has also been noted during charging. Due to the device's metal battery cover, the handset tends to retain any heat generated. It has also been reported that the phone can reboot after reaching high temperatures. Upon rebooting, the phone can hang at the LG start-up logo, necessitating the user to reset the device manually.

== See also ==
- LG Quantum
- Windows Phone

== Comparable Devices ==
- LG Quantum
- HTC HD7
- Samsung Omnia 7
- HTC 7 Trophy
- Nokia Lumia 520
