= Samsung Focus 2 =

Smartphone model

- Manufacturer: Samsung
- Availability by region: May 20, 2012
- Successor: Samsung Focus
- Compatible networks: AT&T Mobility
- Form factor: Slate smartphone
- Dimensions: 4.79 x 2.47 x 0.43 (122 x 63 x 11 mm)
- Weight: 4.3 oz (122 g)
- Operating system: Windows Phone
- CPU: Qualcomm 1.4GHz Scorpion Snapdragon, Adreno 205 GPU
- Memory: 512 MB RAM; 1 GB ROM
- Storage: 8 GB
- Battery: 1750mAh Li-ion; Talk: up to 6 hrs Standby: up to 300 hrs
- Rear camera: 5 MP with autofocus 5× digital zoom 720p HD video recording LED flash Geotagging; Image stabilization
- Front camera: VGA
- Display: 4-inch (diagonal) widescreen Super AMOLED Pentile; 480-by-800 WVGA
- Connectivity: Quad-band GSM/GPRS/EDGE (850 900 1800 1900 MHz); Tri-band UMTS/HSDPA (850 1900 2100 MHz); Wi-Fi (802.11 b/g/n); Bluetooth 2.1 + EDR; A-GPS; FM radio LTE
- Data inputs: Multi-touch touchscreen display Dual microphone 3-axis accelerometer Digital compass Proximity sensor Ambient light sensor

The Samsung Focus 2 (also known as the SGH-i667 and Samsung Mandel) is a slate smartphone which runs Microsoft's Windows Phone operating system. It features a 1.4 GHz Qualcomm Snapdragon processor, a 4.0-inch Super AMOLED Pentile screen, and 8GB of internal storage.

== See also ==
- Samsung Focus
- Samsung Focus S
- Windows Phone
