= LG KS20 =

Mobile phone model

LG-KS20
- Manufacturer: LG Electronics
- Availability by region: 2007
- Compatible networks: HSDPA, GSM / GPRS / EDGE Tri-Band (900/1800/1900)
- Form factor: Candybar
- Dimensions: 99.8×58×12.8 mm (3.93×2.28×0.50 in) (L * W * D)
- Weight: 92.5 g (3 oz)
- Memory: 128 MB
- Removable storage: MicroSD
- Rear camera: 2.0 megapixel, video QVGA@15fps, Strobe Flash
- Front camera: VGA Video call (Front)
- Display: 262K color TFT touchscreen, 2.8", 240 x 320 (QVGA)
- Connectivity: Bluetooth 1.2, USB 2.0

The "LG-KS20" is a touch screen mobile phone manufactured by LG Electronics. It was released in Europe on November 7, 2007.

== Specification sheet ==
Model LG KS20
Group	Functionality	Status
Basic Specification	Network band; Data band; Dimension: L x W x D (mm); Weight with Battery, Standard (g); Standard Battery, Max (mAh); Standby Time, Max (hrs); Talk Time (hrs); Display External LCD (Pixel); No. of Color; Vibrative Alert; SIM Toolkit; Data/Fax	GSM900/1800/1900/WCDMA2100; GPRS/EDGE/UMTS/HSDPA; 99.8 x 58 x 12.8; 92.5g; 1050 mAh; 400hrs; 2hr 40min; 240 x 320 (2.8 inch QVGA LCD) Touchscreen; 262K; Yes; Yes; Yes/No
Internet	Browser; WAP	IE mobile 7.6; version 2.0
Messaging	SMS/MMS; Video MMS; Predictive Text Input (T9); Instant Messaging; Download/Save as Support	Yes/Yes; Yes; Yes (Word complete); Yes; Yes
Voice/Data Connectivity	Voice Memo; Video Telephony; IrDA; USB/PC Sync; WLAN; Bluetooth	Yes; Yes; No; Yes/Yes; WiFi 802.11 b/g; 2.0+EDR, A2DP
Features	OS; JAVA 9 Version; MIDI (Play); FM Radio; Key Tone Effect; Built-in Camera (# of Games); Video Recording / Video Capture; Camera (Main/Sub); Internal Memory; External Memory; Multi-Media Players; Document Viewer	Microsoft Windows Mobile 6.0; MIDP 2.0; 72; Yes; Yes - touch input; Windows App 2.0; Yes/Yes; 2.0 Megapixel Auto Focus Camera (1600x1200) CMOS/VGA camera for video calling; 128MB RAM/256MB ROM; MicroSD up to 2GB; MP3, MPEG4, WAV, 3GP, AMR-NB, WMA, MIDI, AAC, AAC+, eAAC+; MS Office (editable)
Accessories	Battery • Stylus • Travel Adapter • Ear Mic (call button type) • Data CD	

== See also ==
- Touchscreen
- HTC Touch Diamond
- iPhone
- Samsung Omnia
