= Samsung Omnia Series =

Line of smartphones

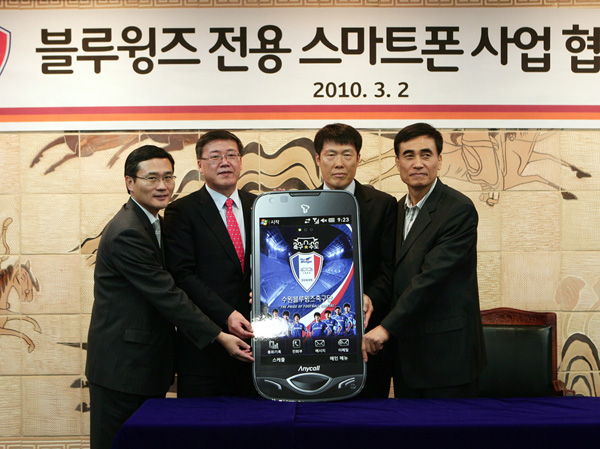
Samsung Omnia Bluewings Phone

The Omnia series is a line of smartphones produced by Samsung Electronics. Omnia devices run either Microsoft's Windows Mobile 6.5, or Windows Phone 7 operating systems, and one Symbian device under the brand was also released.

Samsung Omnia M is a last Omnia phone marketed by Samsung before being superseded by Ativ in Autumn 2012.

== List of Omnia devices ==
=== Symbian ===
- Omnia HD (i8910)

=== Windows Mobile 6.5 ===
- Omnia I (i900) and Omnia I (i910) (US version) come with Windows Mobile 6.1 Professional
- Omnia II (i8000) is the upgrade to the original Omnia. The HSDPA Omnia II gets Windows Mobile 6.1 or 6.5 Professional, TouchWiz 2.0 UI, a 3.7-inch AMOLED display, 5-megapixel camera, AGPS, up to 32 GB memory via microSD, Wi-Fi and launched in December 2009.
- Omnia Lite (B7300) gets multimedia features and a simpler user interface. The HSDPA Omnia LITE gets Windows Mobile 6.5 Professional, TouchWiz 2.0 UI, 3-inch WQVGA display, a "3D" multimedia player, 3-megapixel camera, AGPS, Wi-Fi, and up to 32 GB memory via microSD.
- Omnia Pro (B7610) offers a hybrid touch/QWERTY keyboard. With separate modes for "Work" and "Home" the HSDPA Omnia^{PRO} gets Windows Mobile 6.5 Professional, a 3.5-inch AMOLED display, a 5-megapixel camera, AGPS, up to 32 GB memory via microSD, and Wi-Fi.
- Omnia Pro (B7320)
- Omnia Pro (B7330) loses the touch only offering the QWERTY keyboard. With a full QWERTY keyboard, the HSDPA Omnia^{PRO} gets Windows Mobile 6.5 Standard, a 2.62-inch display, a 3.2-megapixel camera, AGPS, up to 32 GB memory via microSD, and Wi-Fi.

=== Windows Phone ===
- Omnia 7 (released as the Samsung Focus Flash in the United States)
- Omnia W is the second Omnia series Windows Phone smartphone from Samsung.
- Omnia M

== See also ==
- Samsung Focus and Samsung Focus S, Samsung smartphone series that uses Windows Phone and available exclusively in US.
