= HTC Touch Diamond2 =

Mobile phone model

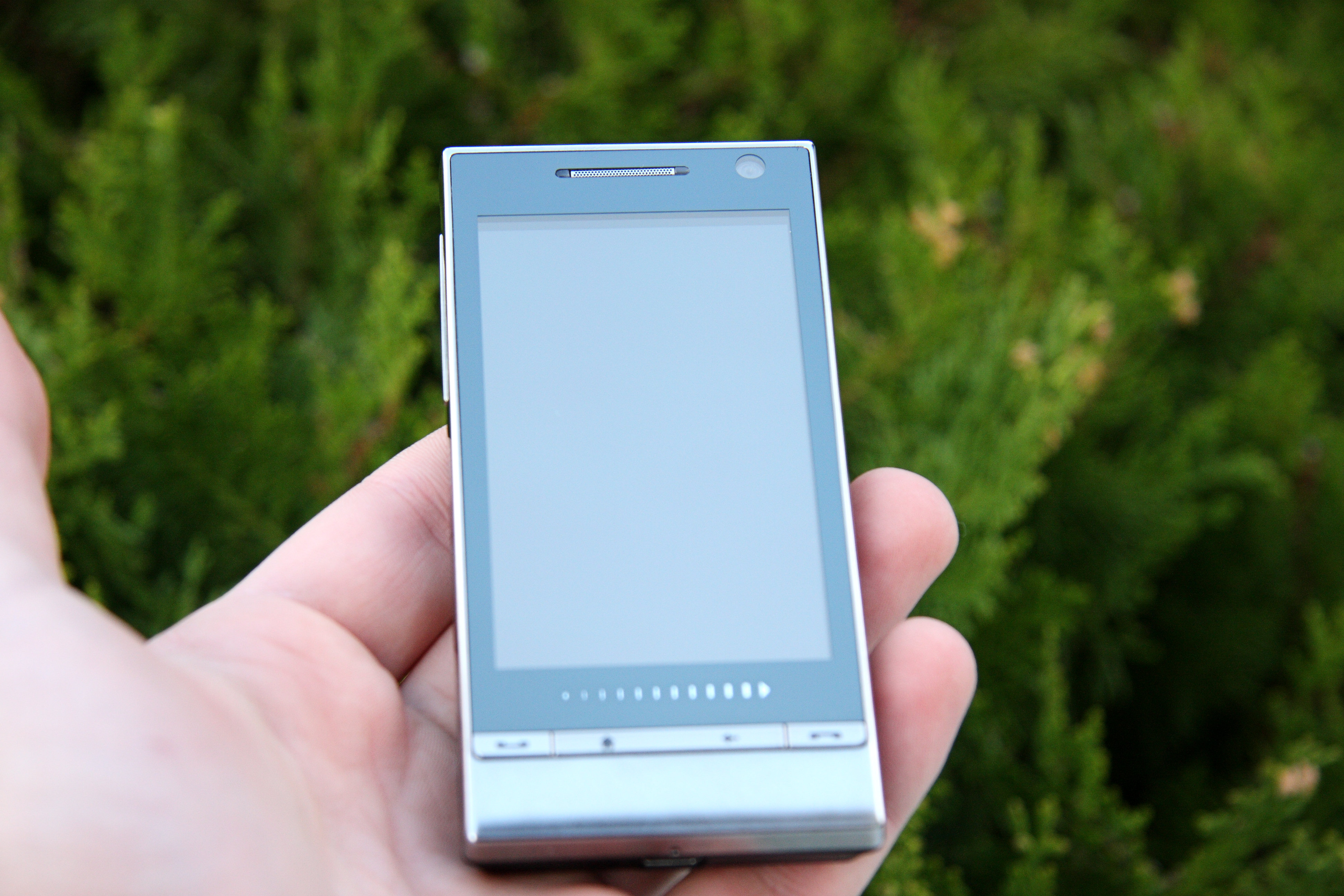
- An image of the HTC Touch Diamond2
- Manufacturer: High Tech Computer Corporation
- Series: HTC Touch family
- Predecessor: HTC Touch Diamond
- Successor: HTC 7 Mozart
- Related: HTC Touch Pro2
- Form factor: Touchscreen
- Dimensions: 107.85 × 53.1 × 13.7 mm (4.25 × 2.09 × 0.54 inches)
- Weight: 117.5 g (4.14 oz) with battery
- Operating system: Windows Mobile 6.5 Professional
- CPU: Qualcomm MSM7200A, 528 MHz
- Memory: 512 MB ROM, 288 MB RAM
- Removable storage: microSD (SD 2.0/SDHC Compatible)
- Battery: 1100 mAh, Li-ion
- Rear camera: 5.0 megapixel AF back
- Front camera: VGA
- Display: 480×800 px (WVGA), 3.2 in (81 mm) touchscreen
- Media: Windows Media Player Mobile
- Connectivity: Bluetooth 2.0, IEEE 802.11 b and g, ExtUSB mini-USB
- Data inputs: Touchscreen
- Other: Official website

The HTC Touch Diamond2, a mobile phone designed by the HTC Corporation, is the successor to the popular HTC Touch Diamond. It is also known by its codename, the HTC Topaz. It is released with Microsoft Windows Mobile 6.1, but can be upgraded to Windows Mobile 6.5. It is the first device to feature a revamped version of HTC's TouchFLO 3D GUI, an interface first seen on its predecessor. The Touch Diamond2 has been announced to be released in Q2 2009 and was first announced at the Mobile World Congress 2009 in Barcelona.

An AT&T-branded version known as the HTC Pure was released in the U.S. on October 6, 2009. The Pure was released with Windows Mobile 6.5, and featured a redesign of the phone, with a more uniform glossy black surface, and a rounded bottom. The unlocked version went on sale in the UK on April 15, 2009, and in Singapore on April 16.

The XDAndroid project makes it possible to run Android on HTC Windows Mobile phones, including the Touch Diamond2.

== Hardware ==
The Touch Diamond2 utilizes a 3.2" wide resistive touchscreen, with a resistive zoom bar below the screen to replace the larger capacitive area and navigational pad found on the HTC Diamond and Touch Pro. This device, although thicker than its predecessor (13.7 millimetres (0.54 in) thick), now features a significantly larger screen with a better resolution (WVGA rather than VGA).

Touch Diamond users complained that battery life was quite poor. At MWC 2009, HTC CEO Peter Chou announced the Touch Diamond2 would have 50% better battery life. The camera has been upped from 3.2 megapixels to 5 megapixels. The device also includes expandable memory, meaning users are able to insert their own microSD cards, rather than relying on internal storage only, as with the original Diamond. HTC has again included an accelerometer for screen rotation detection and a light sensor for automatic backlight adjustment. HTC opted out, however, of including a proximity sensor, a feature prominently featured on their enterprise flagship device, the Touch Pro2.
