= HTC Titan II =

Smartphone running Windows Phone OS 7.5

- Manufacturer: HTC Corporation
- Availability by region: April 8, 2012
- Predecessor: HTC Titan
- Dimensions: 5.18 in (13.2 cm) H 2.78 in (7.1 cm) W 0.39 in (9.9 mm) D
- Weight: 173 g (6.1 oz)
- Operating system: Windows Phone Mango
- CPU: 1.5 GHz Scorpion SoC processor; Qualcomm Snapdragon S2 MSM8255T + MDM9200
- GPU: Adreno 205; 41 MPolygon/s, 245 Mpixel/s fill rate
- Memory: 512 MB RAM
- Storage: 16 GB flash memory
- Battery: Rechargeable 1730mAh
- Rear camera: 16 MP with F2.6 lens, autofocus, dual LED flash, back side illumination, CMOS sensor, HD video recording up to 720p resolution
- Front camera: 1.3 MP for video calls
- Display: 4.7 in. 480 × 800 px WVGA; S-LCD capacitive touchscreen 198 PPI, 16.7 million colors (24 bits)
- Connectivity: Bluetooth 2.1 + EDR, Wi-Fi (802.11 b/g/n), DLNA, A-GPS, micro-USB, 3.5mm audio jack
- Data inputs: Multi-touch touch screen, proximity and ambient light sensors, 6-axis gyroscope and accelerometer, magnetometer, microphone
- Other: SRS surround sound, HTC Watch
- Website: http://www.htc.com/us/smartphones/htc-titan-2-att/

The HTC Titan II, (stylized and marketed as uppercase HTC TITAN II; previously codenamed HTC Radiant) is a smartphone designed and manufactured by HTC Corporation running the Windows Phone OS 7.5. It is the successor to the HTC Titan. The HTC Titan II was the first Windows Phone device with support for LTE connectivity, it is sold exclusively by AT&T carrier in the United States.

== Description ==
It was announced during the International CES 2012, and released in the United States April 8, 2012, for US$199,99 on contract.

The HTC Titan II shares much resemblance with its predecessor, the HTC Titan, though it has a 16-megapixel (compared to 8) rear camera and supports LTE.

== Reception ==
David Pierce of The Verge in his review wrote: "There are things to like about the Titan II, but it has two fatal flaws: an operating system that’s still a cycle behind... and the competition. If you're in the market for a smartphone, be sure Windows Phone is the OS you need. At the moment it’s still in its infancy, and well behind iOS and Android in some key areas."

Brad Molen of Engadget in his review wrote: "Overall, we have very few qualms with the HTC Titan II. Despite its clumsier design, it certainly has more to offer than its predecessor, which was already considered a great phone when it was released on AT&T a scant five months ago (six months if you count the European launch). But is there any reason to fork out $200 for a Windows Phone that has roughly the same feature set as the less expensive Nokia Lumia 900, which is getting subsidized beyond our wildest dreams? Unless you're a camera enthusiast, we think your money could be put to better use elsewhere."
