= Samsung Omnia M =

Smartphone model

- Manufacturer: Samsung
- Type: Touchscreen smartphone
- Series: Samsung Omnia Series – S7530
- First released: July 2012
- Compatible networks: 2.5G GSM/GPRS/EDGE – 850, 900, 1800, 1900 MHz; 3G UMTS/HSDPA 7.2 Mbit/s – 900, 2100 MHz
- Form factor: Bar
- Dimensions: 121.6 mm (4.79 in) H 64.1 mm (2.52 in) W 10.5 mm (0.41 in) D
- Weight: 119 g (4.2 oz)
- Operating system: Windows Phone 7.5
- CPU: 1 GHz single core Qualcomm S1 MSM7227A
- GPU: Adreno 200 (enhanced)
- Memory: 384 MB RAM
- Storage: 4/8 GB internal flash and 7 GB free in SkyDrive
- Battery: User serviceable 1500 mAh Li-poly battery
- Rear camera: 5 MP, 480p VGA video capture @ 30 fps
- Front camera: 0.3 megapixel VGA
- Display: 4.0 in (100 mm) WVGA Super AMOLED, 800 x 480 pixels at 233 ppi, 15:9 aspect ratio, Color depth 16 bit, 65k colors, 60 Hz refresh rate
- Connectivity: List: Wi-Fi :802.11 b/g/n; Assisted global positioning system (aGPS); Bluetooth 2.1 + EDR; Micro-USB 2.0
- Data inputs: Multi-touch capacitive touchscreen, proximity sensor, and light sensor.
- Other: Talk time: Up to 12.6 hours Standby time: Up to 530 hours (approx. 22 days)
- Website: Samsung Omnia M

The Samsung Omnia M (also known as the S7530) is a budget smartphone developed by Samsung. Part of the Omnia series, it was announced in May 2012 and released in July 2012 in the European market. The phone also became available in China on China Mobile and China Unicom, as well as in Brazil. A version was planned for China Telecom but was never released.

== Primary features ==
The primary features of the Omnia M are:

- 4.0in 800×480 Super AMOLED 233 PPI touchscreen display
- 5 MP primary camera
- VGA video and photo recording
- 0.3 MP front facing camera
- Microsoft Windows Phone 7.5 operating system

== Availability ==
The phone officially launched on July 31, 2012, and was originally for sale exclusively through Phones 4u in the United Kingdom at £289.95. In Italy and other European markets, the device launched for €294.99. The Omnia M was also released in Brazil for R$799. When the Omnia M was launched in China, the variant sold by China Unicom shipped with 8 GB of internal storage instead of the usual 4 GB.

== Reception ==
The Omnia M received mixed feedback upon its announcement and launch. Reviewers noted the relatively high price for the device compared to its hardware specifications and competing devices. The device was praised for its build, camera, display, and battery life; however, its low RAM and built-in storage were areas of concern, as the 4 GB variant had only 2.5 GB of user-accessible storage due to default applications. Additionally, the lack of HSPA+ or DC-HSPA+ was criticized as providing insufficient data speed compared to other devices. The device was also compared to its predecessor, the Omnia W.
