= Fujitsu Toshiba IS12T =

Smartphone model

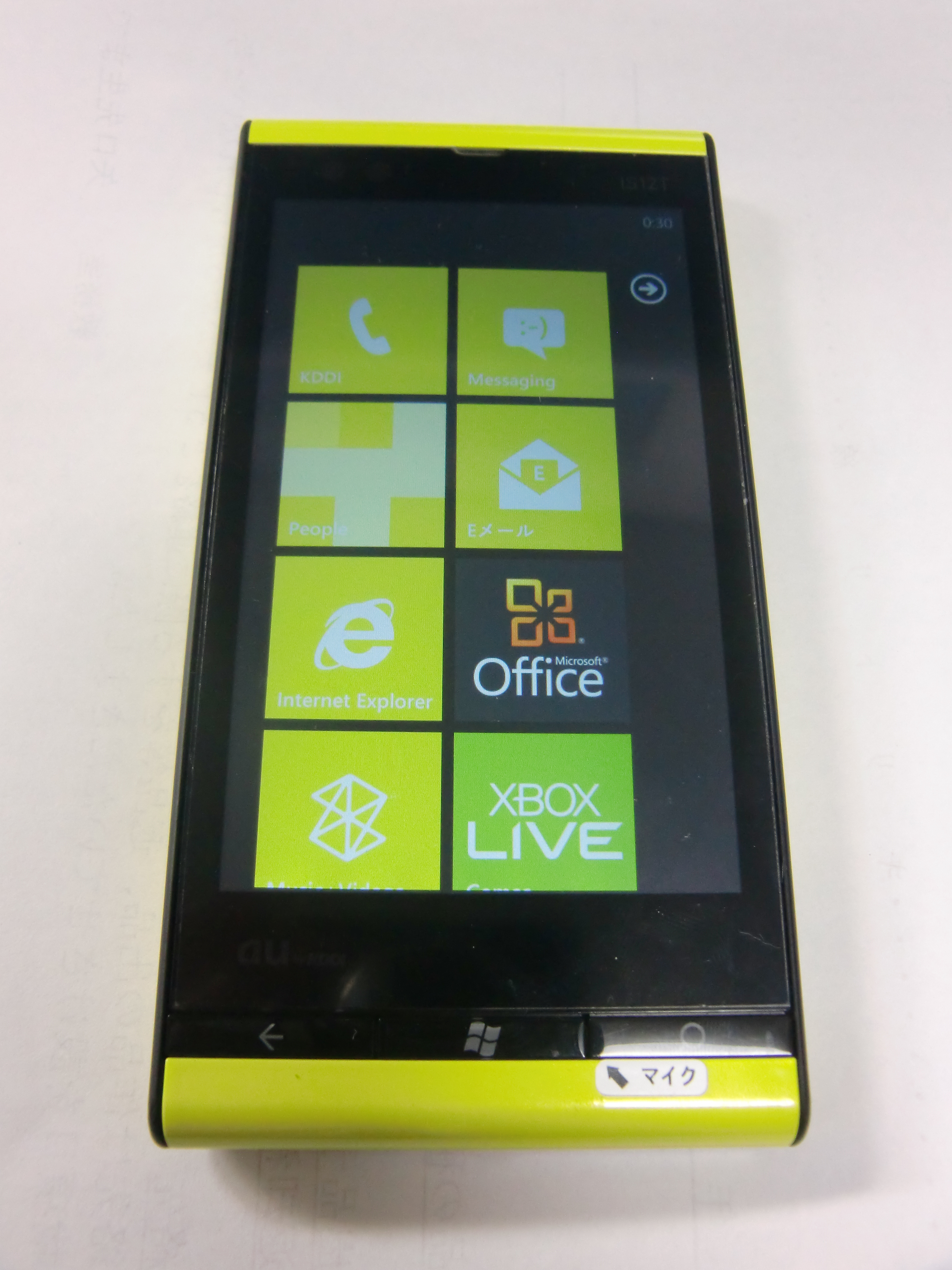
- Manufacturer: Fujitsu Toshiba
- Availability by region: 2011
- Dimensions: 118×59×10.6 mm (4.65×2.32×0.42 in)
- Weight: 113 g (4 oz)
- Operating system: Windows Phone
- CPU: (Qualcomm Snapdragon MSM8655); 1 GHz Scorpion processor / Adreno 205 graphics
- Memory: Flash Memory 32GB, 512 MB ROM, 512 MB RAM
- Rear camera: 13.2-megapixel autofocus with LED flash, CMOS sensor, HD video recording up to 720p of resolution.
- Display: 3.7 in. LCD capacitive touchscreen 480x800 px 16m-color WVGA
- Connectivity: Bluetooth 2.1 + EDR, Wi-Fi 802.11b/g/n, A-GPS, micro-USB, 3.5mm audio jack
- Data inputs: Multi-touch Capacitive Touchscreen, Proximity Sensor, Ambient Light Sensor, 3-axis Accelerometer, Magnetometer

The Fujitsu Toshiba IS12T is a mobile smartphone running the Windows Phone operating system and was designed and manufactured by Fujitsu Toshiba. The phone is waterproof and is the first and only Windows Phone to be officially released in Japan under carrier KDDI.

== Launch ==
Fujitsu Toshiba mobile communications announced the Fujitsu Toshiba IS12T on July 26, 2011 and available for retail on September 11.

== Hardware ==
The IS12T is the first waterproof Windows Phone and also the first to feature a 13.2-megapixel camera. It can operate on either CDMA2000/EV-DO Rev. A or GSM/UMTS networks.

It is able to receive earthquake warnings.

== See also ==
- Windows Phone
