= ZTE Tania =

Smartphone released in 2012

- Manufacturer: ZTE
- Availability by region: February 13, 2012 (UK)
- Operating system: Windows Phone
- CPU: (Qualcomm Snapdragon MSM8255); 1 GHz Scorpion processor/ Adreno 205 graphics (upgraded to 1.4 GHz in China)
- Memory: flash memory 4 GB (2.9 GB usable space), 512 MB RAM
- Battery: 1400 mAh
- Rear camera: 5-megapixel autofocus
- Display: 4.3 in. LCD capacitive touchscreen 480x800 px 16m-color WVGA
- Connectivity: Bluetooth 2.1 + EDR, Wi-Fi 802.11b/g/n, A-GPS, micro-USB, 3.5mm audio jack
- Data inputs: Multi-touch capacitive touchscreen, proximity sensor, ambient light sensor, 3-axis accelerometer, magnetometer
- Development status: Discontinued

The ZTE Tania is the first Windows Phone device manufactured by ZTE.

== Hardware ==
The ZTE Tania is a Windows Phone device which was meant to serve the lower-end market. The phone had a 4.3-inch WVGA 800x480 TN LCD screen, 5-megapixel autofocus camera, and 4 GB of storage.

== See also ==
- ZTE Orbit
