= Dell Venue Pro =

Smartphone by Dell

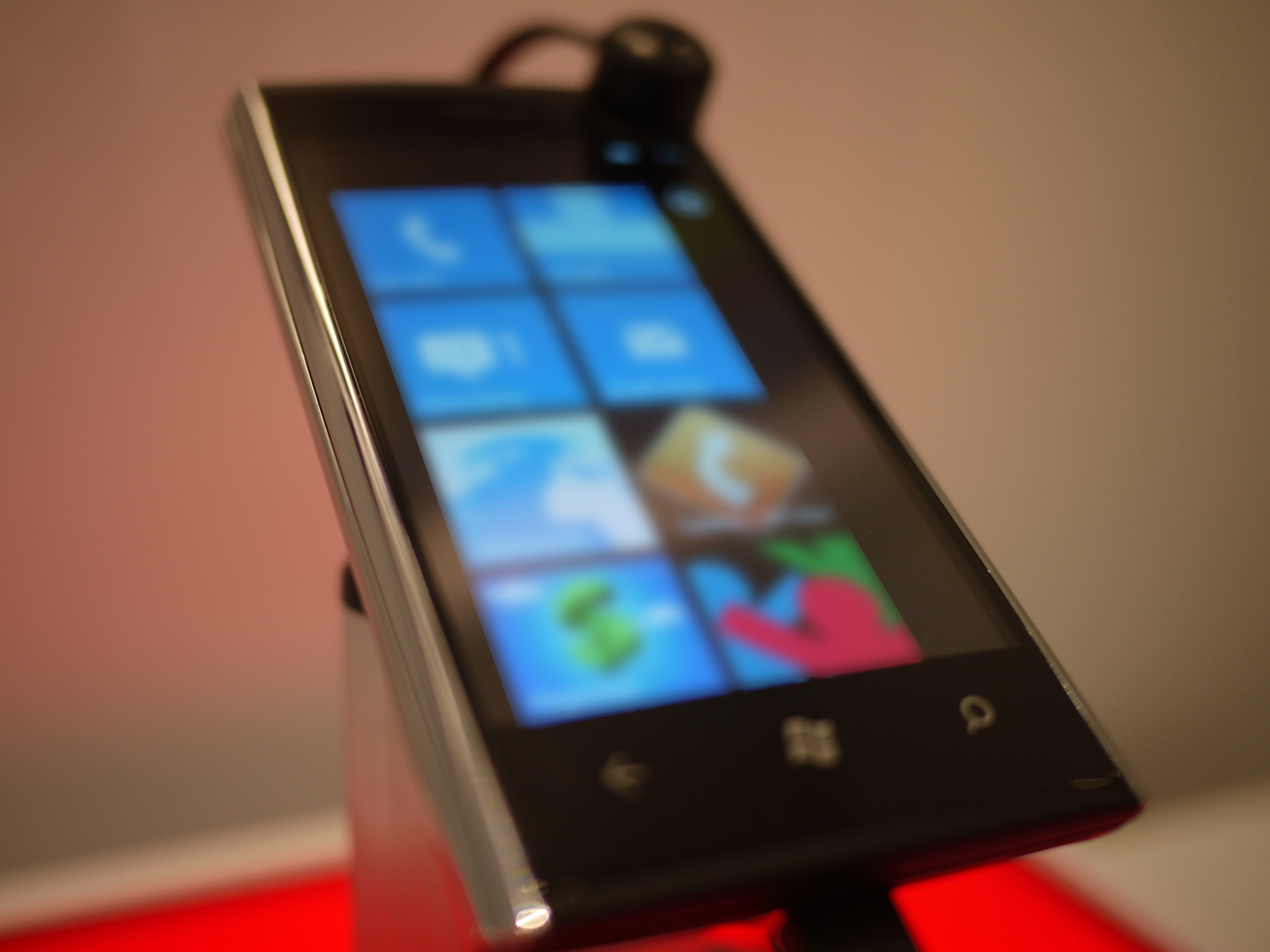
- Manufacturer: Dell
- First released: November 2010
- Compatible networks: GSM, UMTS
- Form factor: Slider smartphone
- Dimensions: 122.0 mm (4.80 in) (h); 63.5 mm (2.50 in) (w); 15.2 mm (0.60 in) (d)
- Weight: 192.78 g (6.8 oz)
- Operating system: Windows Phone; 7.0.7392.0 (United States); 7.0.7355.0 (India); 7.10.8862.144 (Germany)
- CPU: Qualcomm QSD8250 1GHz Scorpion (Snapdragon)
- Memory: 512 MB RAM
- Storage: 8GB, 16GB, 32GB
- Removable storage: N/A
- Battery: 1400 mAh Lithium-ion battery
- Rear camera: 5 megapixel autofocus with flash, rear-facing
- Front camera: None
- Display: 4.1-inch (diagonal) widescreen 480-by-800 WVGA AMOLED
- Connectivity: Quad-band UMTS 850; UMTS 1900; UMTS 1700; UMTS 2100
- Data inputs: Multi-touch touchscreen display Dual microphone 3-axis accelerometer Digital compass Proximity sensor Ambient light sensor
- Development status: Discontinued
- Other: Wi-Fi, Vertical slide out QWERTY keyboard, FM radio, GPS

The Dell Venue Pro, codenamed Lightning, was a smartphone running the Windows Phone operating system. The phone used the T-Mobile network, but was only available for purchase at Microsoft retail stores or directly from Dell.

The launch of the phone suffered multiple setbacks, due to many technical and logistics issues, with poor communication between Dell and its customers. In March 2012, Dell stopped production.

It was priced at $99.99 on 2-year contract (8 GB), $149.99 on 2-year contract (16 GB), $449.99 off contract (8 GB) and $499.99 off contract (16 GB).

In the USA, it was available on carriers such as T-Mobile USA; AT&T; Cincinnati Bell Wireless

== Launch ==
The phone was codenamed 'Lightning' during production. Details were leaked to the Internet on April 21, 2010.

Despite being cited as a launch partner for Windows Phone headsets early in July, the phone was not widely on sale in the United States on the launch day, unlike phones from other launch partners, such as Samsung Focus and three other phones by HTC.

On October 11, in an official statement, Dell announced the phone to be available in the U.S. in holiday season of 2010. On November 8, Windows Phone was launched, and a very limited quantity of Venue Pros were available for purchase only in the seven Microsoft stores in the U.S. However, some early adopters of the phone received defective phones with Wi-Fi issues, SIM card issues, faulty headphone jack, and batteries marked as "Engineering Sample". Despite Dell urging users to return the phones, no phones were available in stock for exchange, and phones were not reshipped on November 19 as claimed.

After missing both the States-wide launch on November 8 and the online launch on November 15, Dell announced that they were "ramping up production" and intended to launch the phone on a bigger scale.

On December 1, Dell reintroduced the phone and began taking orders. Customers were given a shipping date of December 15. However, a day before the estimated shipping date, customers were informed that the shipping date was pushed further until January 6, 2011, two months after its intended launch date, as the phones "were being reworked in the factories". This caused user uproar in many Windows Phone communities.

On December 16, Dell issued a new notice to assure that orders received before December 14 would be shipped before Christmas with an overnight shipping upgrade and a free gift. However, the Estimated Delivery Date of the orders were not updated until a couple days later, causing confusion amongst anticipating customers. Several customers who ordered on a later date received phones before those who ordered earlier. The promised shipping upgrade was also not fulfilled for many customers.

On February 3, 2011, Dell launched Venue Pro in India. The launch price of Dell Venue was Rs. 34,990.

On September 23, 2011, Dell posted that the Dell Venue Pro will get the Mango update "later this fall" on the unlocked Cincinnati Bell and T-Mobile devices. Dell released the Venue Pro for the AT&T network later that year.

As of December 1, 2011, all Dell Venue Pros have been upgraded to Mango, including those shipped from the factory.

As of March 8, 2012, Dell are discontinuing future production of the Dell Venue Pro and Venue smartphones — This was announced internally to Dell staff on 8 March.

== Wi-Fi bug ==
The first batch of Dell Venue Pro phones to be manufactured suffered a bug which prevented them from logging onto secure Wi-Fi networks. Dell urged users with buggy phones to return them to the place of purchase and receive replacement handsets. In addition, even after the full launch of the Venue Pro, there have been reports of WiFi crashing the phone while downloading or using the data connection in some way.

== Third Party Involvement ==
When entering a Venue Pro's IMEI number into an IMEI checking facility the manufacturer of the device is reported as Qisda Corporation, the parent company of BenQ. The involvement of a third party is also apparent in the 'EM' phone management app.
