= Acer Allegro =

Mobile phone model

- Manufacturer: Acer
- Availability by region: 2011
- Operating system: Windows Phone
- CPU: (Qualcomm Snapdragon MSM8255); 1 GHz Scorpion processor / Adreno 205 graphics
- Memory: Flash Memory 8 GB, 512 MB ROM, 512 MB RAM
- Rear camera: 5-megapixel autofocus
- Display: 3.6 in. LCD capacitive touchscreen 480x800 px 16m-color WVGA
- Connectivity: Bluetooth 2.1 + EDR, Wi-Fi 802.11b/g/n, A-GPS, micro-USB, 3.5mm audio jack
- Data inputs: Multi-touch Capacitive Touchscreen, Proximity Sensor, Ambient Light Sensor, 3-axis Accelerometer, Magnetometer

The Acer Allegro is the first mobile smartphone manufactured by Acer running Windows Phone operating system.

== Hardware ==
The Acer Allegro is a Windows Phone 7.5 smartphone with a 3.6-inch WVGA display, 1 GHz processor, 512 MB RAM, 8 GB internal storage, 5-megapixel camera, aGPS, Wi-Fi, Bluetooth and microUSB

== Pricing ==
=== India ===
In India, Acer Allegro is priced around ₹ 15,000 to ₹ 17,000.

=== Benelux ===
In Benelux, the Acer Allegro is priced around €300.

== See also ==
- Windows Phone
