= HTC 7 Mozart =

Smartphone manufactured by HTC

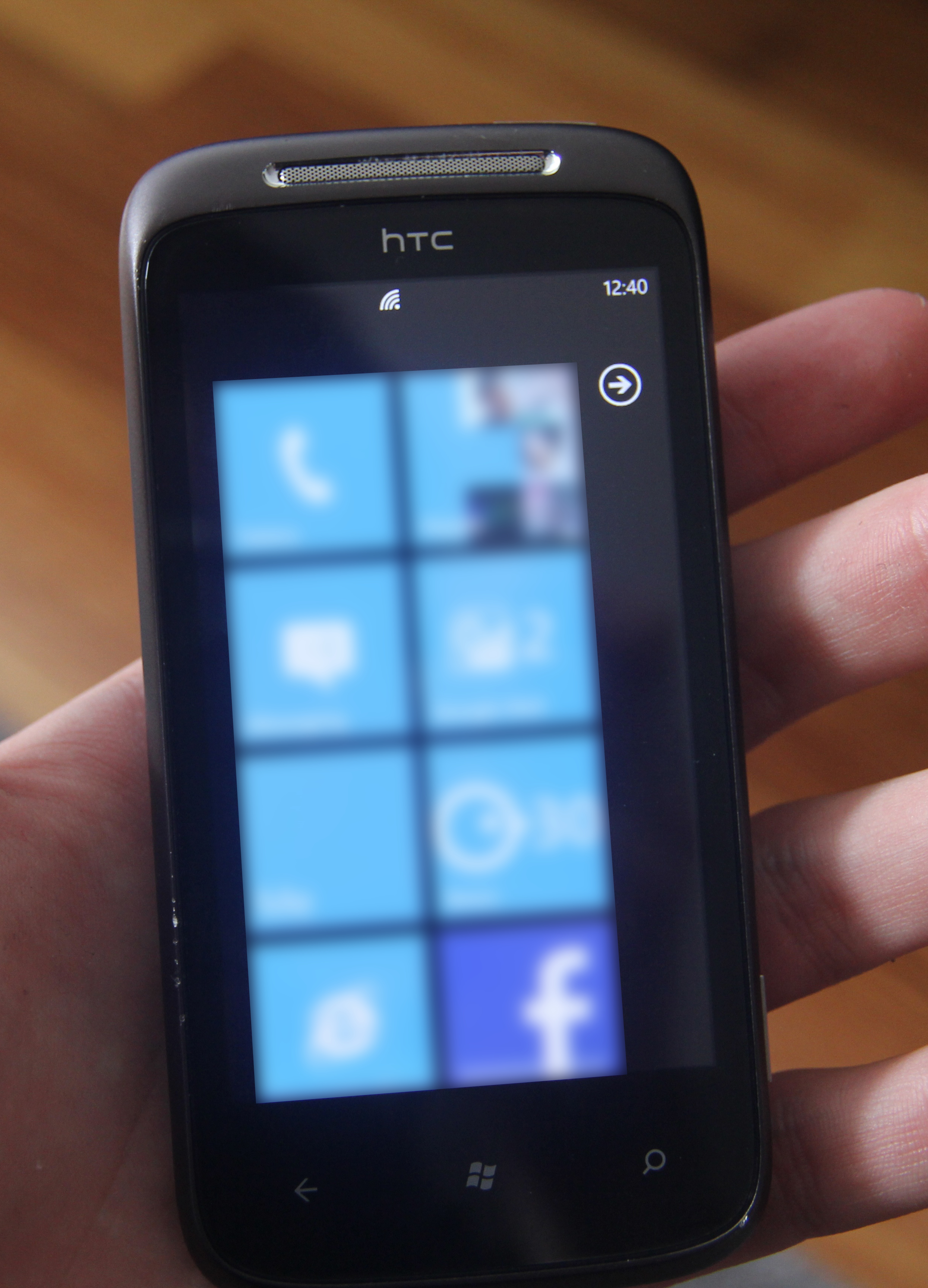
- Manufacturer: HTC Corporation
- Availability by region: October 2010 (Europe/Asia Pacific)
- Predecessor: HTC Touch Diamond2
- Related: HTC 7 Surround, HTC HD7
- Compatible networks: GSM, HSDPA, Wi-Fi
- Dimensions: 119×60.2×11.9 mm (4.69×2.37×0.47 in)
- Weight: 130 g (4.59 oz)
- Operating system: Windows Phone 7
- CPU: Qualcomm QSD8250 1 GHz Scorpion (Snapdragon)
- Memory: 8 GB internal flash / 16 GB with T-Mobile Germany branding 512 MB ROM; 576 MB RAM
- Battery: Rechargeable 1300mAh Li-ion battery (Extended Battery Available)
- Rear camera: 8-megapixel autofocus CMOS sensor with Xenon flash, video up to 720p resolution
- Display: 3.7 in. LCD capacitive touchscreen 480x800 px 16m-color WVGA, backlit TFT LCD
- Connectivity: Bluetooth 2.1, 802.11b/g/n, G-Sensor, Digital Compass, A-GPS, micro-USB, 3.5mm audio jack
- Data inputs: Multi-touch capacitive touchscreen, proximity sensor, ambient light sensor, 3-axis accelerometer, digital compass
- Development status: Released
- Test mode: ##3282#
- Other: Dolby Mobile Sound

The HTC 7 Mozart (also known as the HTC Mozart), is a mobile smartphone running the Windows Phone operating system. The phone was designed and manufactured by HTC.

The HTC 7 Mozart is one of three Windows Phone handsets available from HTC in the UK at launch, and has a focus on high-fidelity audio with Dolby Mobile and SRS surround sound built in. It is also the only Windows Phone product from HTC with a Qualcomm S2 Generation chipset. All others use the S1 generation (As of August 20, 2011).

Available exclusively on Orange from 21 October 2010 to 2011, the HTC 7 Mozart is very similar in size and styling to many other HTC handsets, save that it boasts the three standard buttons below the screen specified by Microsoft across all Windows Phone devices.

== Operating system ==
There was a lot of speculation whether HTC Mozart was to get the 7.8 Update. This was confirmed by HTC and the update was released on 14/03/2013. The most recent update is the Build 7.10.8862.144 live tile fix which can be downloaded via Zune.

Since 2012, people have reported they were able to upgrade to 7.8 RTM using a cab sender utility. This method of upgrading has proved successful to many people but it is only recommended for advanced users.

The 7.8 update gives the Mozart increased performance and battery life has an easy to spot improvement. The standard life on Windows Phone 7.5 was reported at around 5 hours of heavy usage. Windows Phone 7.8 however has increased battery life up to 10 hours on heavy usage.

== Announcement ==
Announced at the Windows Phone event in New York City on October 11, 2010.

== See also ==
- Windows Phone
