= Samsung Omnia 7 =

Smartphone made by Samsung Electronics

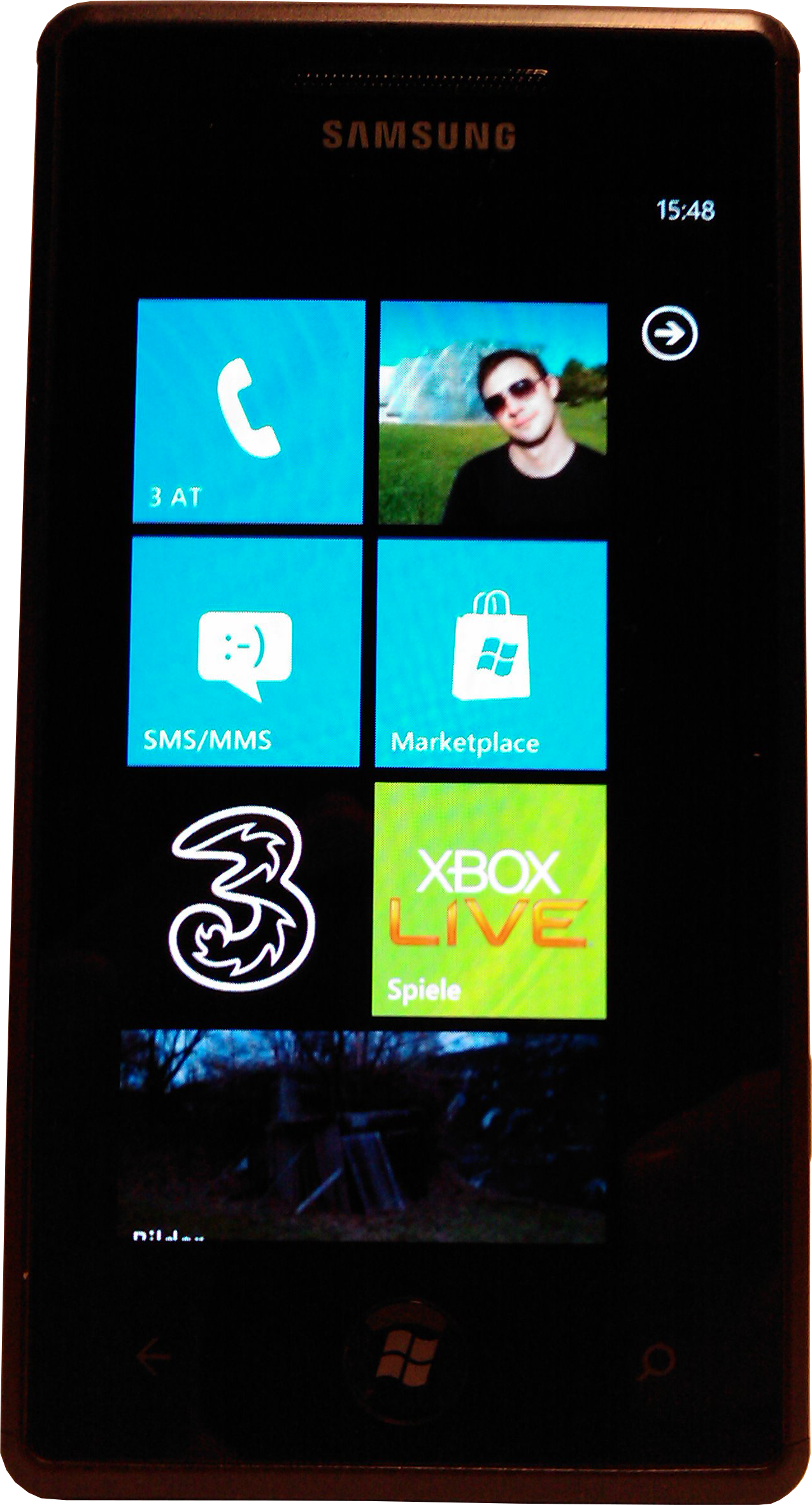
- Manufacturer: Samsung
- Type: Smartphone
- Series: Omnia
- First released: November 2010; 16 years ago
- Predecessor: Samsung Omnia II
- Successor: Samsung Omnia W
- Related: Samsung Galaxy S1
- Compatible networks: GSM (850, 900, 1800, and 1900 MHz); GPRS/EDGE (850 and 1900 MHz); WCDMA (900, 1900 and 2100 MHz); HSDPA 7.2 Mbit/s; HSUPA 5.76 Mbit/s
- Form factor: Slate
- Dimensions: 122.4 mm (4.82 in) H 64.2 mm (2.53 in) W 11 mm (0.43 in) D
- Weight: 138 g (4.9 oz)
- Operating system: Windows Phone
- CPU: 1GHz Qualcomm QSD8250 Scorpion (Snapdragon)
- Memory: 512 MB RAM
- Storage: 1 GB ROM; 8 or 16 GB (iNAND)
- Battery: 1,500 mAh, 5.55 Wh, 3.7 V Internal rechargeable li-ion User replaceable
- Rear camera: 5 MP (2,592×1,944) Auto Focus; LED flash HD video recording (720p at 25 fps)
- Display: Super AMOLED, 4.0 in (100 mm) diagonal 800×480 px WVGA; 1.6̅:1 aspect-ratio wide-screen 16M colors
- Connectivity: 3.5 mm TRRS; Bluetooth v2.1 + EDR; DLNA; FM radio with RDS; Micro USB 2.0; Wi-Fi 802.11b/g/n
- Data inputs: 3-axis accelerometer A-GPS; Ambient light sensor Capacitive touch-sensitive buttons Digital compass Dual microphone Multi-touch touchscreen display Proximity sensor Push buttons
- Development status: Discontinued

The Samsung Omnia 7 (also known as the GT-i8700) is a smartphone which runs Microsoft's Windows Phone 7 operating system. It was released in Q4 2010 as one of the first Windows Phone products and it is upgradable to Windows Phone 7.8. It features a Qualcomm Snapdragon QSD8250 SoC clocked at 1 GHz, a 4.0-inch Super AMOLED screen with a resolution of 480×800, and either 8 GB or 16 GB capacity of internal storage. The phone does not contain a microSD slot for extra storage. It was available in Europe and South Africa, whereas the Samsung Focus was sold in the United States.

== Software issues ==
Some users of the Omnia 7 along with the Samsung Focus had issues with upgrading to the March 2011 update and again with the NODO update. Samsung and Microsoft have since worked to deliver updates for the phones to resolve the upgrade problem.

== See also ==
- Windows Phone
