= Samsung i8000 Omnia II =

Smartphone model

Samsung Omnia II
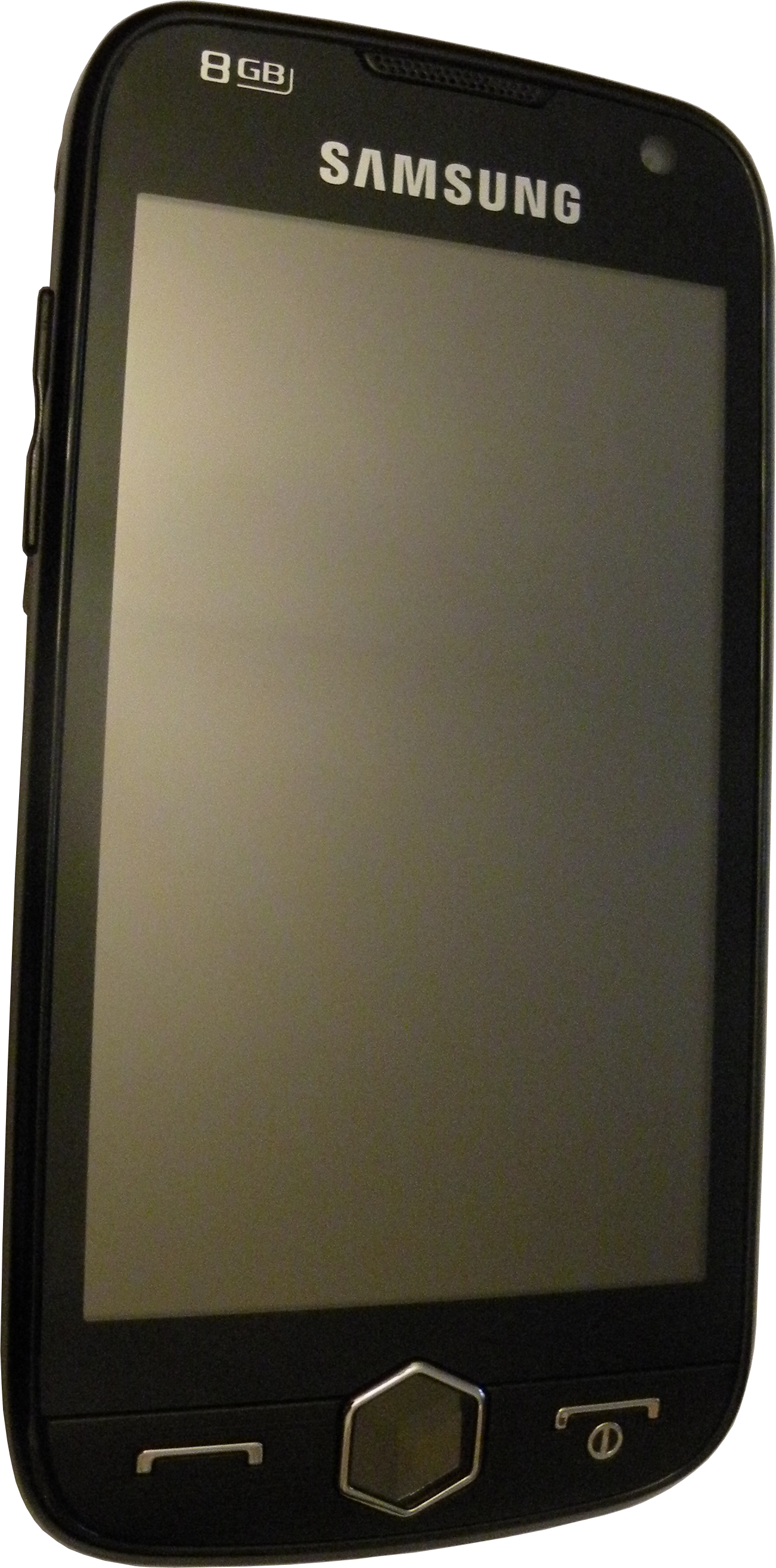
- Manufacturer: Samsung
- Series: Samsung Omnia Series
- Availability by region: 2009; 17 years ago
- Predecessor: Samsung i900 Omnia
- Successor: Samsung Galaxy S Samsung Omnia 7
- Compatible networks: HSUPA 5.76 Mbit/s, HSDPA 7.2 Mbit/s, EDGE/GPRS Quad Band 850, 900, 1,800, and 1,900 MHz, UMTS Tri Band 900, 1,900, and 2,100 MHz
- Form factor: Candybar
- Dimensions: 118×60×11.9 mm (4.65×2.36×0.47 in)
- Weight: 117 g (4 oz)
- Operating system: Windows Mobile 6.1, upgradable to Windows Mobile 6.5 Professional
- CPU: Samsung S3C6410 ARM 1176 800 MHz (32-Bit) processor, dedicated graphics
- Memory: 256 MB RAM, 512 MB ROM, 2, 8, or 16 GB internal flash memory
- Storage: 8 or 16 GB
- Removable storage: microSDHC 32 GB max.
- Battery: Li-Ion 1.5 Ah, user-replaceable
- Rear camera: 5 MP, 2,560×1,920 pixels, 720×480 (D1) video recording, autofocus, dual-LED flash (Note: Output file saved at 30 fps and without sound. Resolution: 320×240 Pixels.), QVGA Slow Motion Capabilities at 120 FPS
- Display: 3.7 inches (94 mm) 16M (limited to 65K) colours advanced resistive touchscreen WVGA AMOLED (480 × 800)
- Connectivity: WLAN 802.11b/g, USB 2.0, Bluetooth 2.0
- Data inputs: Stylus pen, 3-axis accelerometer, proximity sensor, magnetometer for digital compass, ambient light sensor
- SAR: 0.197

The Samsung Omnia II GT-I8000(H/L/U) is a multimedia smartphone announced at Samsung Mobile Unpacked on June 15, 2009. Earlier Omnia II releases run Windows Mobile 6.1, however they are upgradable to version 6.5 Professional. There is also an unofficial and experimental Android version available. Verizon is the official US carrier for this phone and released it in December 2009.

== Display ==
This smartphone comes with a 3.7" AMOLED resistive touch screen having a resolution of 800 × 480 pixels and 16 million (2^{24}) colors. It is used in conjunction with a stylus pen. The Windows Mobile operating system limits it to 65536 (2^{16}) colors. However, it produces unparalleled colour contrast and to date, it and the Samsung Omnia Pro B7610 are still the only Windows phones to use this technology.

== Connectivity, memory ==
For connectivity, the device offers Wi-Fi, Bluetooth 2.0 with stereo audio and A2DP, a microUSB port, a 3.5mm audio jack, and a GPS receiver with A-GPS built in.

Its Bluetooth can be used for both direct file transfers and sharing directories via FTP.

Cellular networks

The i8000 Omnia II is a quad-band GSM/GPRS/EDGE handset with tri-band UMTS, and HSDPA (up to 7.2 Mbit/s) and HSUPA (up to 5.76 Mbit/s) support.

Storage

The Omnia II comes with 2, 8, or 16 GB of internal flash memory (user data partition) and supports hot-swappable microSDHC memory cards of up to 32 GB, for a theoretical maximum storage of 48 GB. It has 256 MB RAM and 512 MB ROM. The internal user data partition and memory card are accessible through both mass storage and Media Transfer Protocol (MTP); the system partition only through the latter.

== Camera ==
The Omnia II has a 5-Megapixel (2560×1920) camera with dual-LED flash that can also operate during video recording, 480p D1 video recording with 720 × 480 pixels at 30 frames per second, which matches the standard resolution of the DVD-Video format.

The Omnia II additionally supports slow motion video recording with QVGA (320 × 240 pixels) at 120 frames per second, making it the earliest known smartphone to feature slow-motion video recording. The shutter button has two levels to resemble the point-and-shoot intuition from standalone digital cameras. Camera modes include "Sports mode" for shorter exposure times and "Night mode" for prolonged exposure times.

Other imaging assets include geotagging, face detection, and smile detection. The phone has built-in video editing abilities, including trimming, audio dubbing, live dubbing, and subtitling. The Omnia II includes an advanced image-capturing feature called ActionShot Panoramic photography.

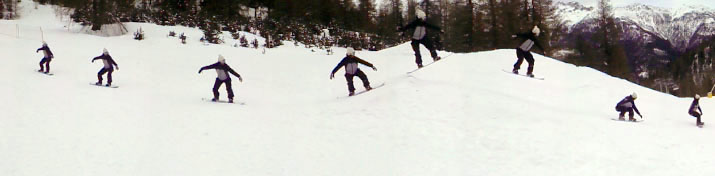
ActionShot panoramic photo captured with Omnia2 device

The pre-included Smart Reader application is able to digitize business cards into a phone book entry, read text documents and translate text between English and French.

== User interface, software features ==
Unlike its predecessor, the Samsung Omnia (i900) which came with 3 different proprietary home screens, the Omnia II only comes with the TouchWiz UI. Touchwiz has been upgraded so that there are now 3 customizable homescreens, and a separate app drawer named Main menu. Furthermore, widgets can now be added and removed from the homescreen via the Widget Manager. New widgets can be downloaded using the "MORE Widget" icon.

The widgets are mini applications or shortcuts to different parts of the user interface, sitting in the tray until drawn to the screen. Available widgets include a digital clock, image gallery, profile manager, news application, custom app shortcuts and more.

Custom app shortcuts can also be assigned to the home button and the function button (located next to the camera shutter button), separately for short presses and when held down.

A three-dimensional cubic launcher interface with integrated three-dimensional preview browser for photos, music, videos, contacts, games and browser bookmarks is pre-included.

The task switcher has a grid and an overlapping viewing mode.

This phone was among the first to support Swype. This phone was used by Franklin Page on 22 March 2010, along with Swype, to break a world record for fastest text message on a touch screen, a fact which was utilized in marketing campaigns for the phone. ClearType fonts are supported.

The telephone app has a call recording feature.

Software such as Touch Media Player, Touch Calendars and a new message app are all designed for touch screens. The device comes with Opera 9.5, a touch mobile web browser, with support for Adobe Flash Lite, which then was widely used for online multimedia content. Microsoft Internet Explorer Mobile is also pre-included. The Media Player app has a 3D album browser activated when held horizontally.

Streaming audio and video files through Hypertext Transfer Protocol (HTTP) and Rapid Spanning Tree Protocol (RSTP) is supported through both the dedicated Streaming Player app and the mobile edition of Windows Media Player, both pre-included. Streaming through Server Message Block (SMB) is supported through the pre-included Connected Home application.

Pre-included mobile games are Asphalt 4 by GameLoft, Crayon physics, a dice simulator, bubble breaker, Block Breaker Deluxe 2, and a Tetris demo version.

Other pre-included office apps are an email client, a scientific calculator, a unit converter, memorandum, calendar/planner with date jumping, and mobile versions of Microsoft Office Word, Excel, OneNote and PowerPoint.

Samsung featured part of the device's functionality in a Flash-based simulator.

== Other versions ==
The Omnia II is sold as SCH-i920 in the United States under Verizon Wireless with a different external appearance. This version has 8 GB of storage and is lacking the front-facing camera with only a single LED flash on the rear camera. The button layout has also been adjusted and the 3.5mm jack and micro USB port have been moved to the sides of the device.

In Korea, it is sold as SCH-M710/715 T*Omnia II, also with different external appearance.

In Australia, it is sold as the Omnia Icon, different from the original Omnia Icon. The external appearance is as represented here.
