= Samsung B7610 =

Smartphone produced by Samsung

Samsung Omnia^{PRO} B7610
- Manufacturer: Samsung
- Series: Samsung Omnia Series
- Availability by region: 2009
- Compatible networks: HSDPA (3.5G), Quad band GSM / GPRS / EDGE GSM 850, GSM 900, GSM 1800, GSM 1900
- Form factor: Slider
- Dimensions: 112.6×57.8×16.2 mm (4.43×2.28×0.64 in)
- Weight: 159 g (6 oz)
- Operating system: Microsoft Windows Mobile 6.1/6.5 Professional
- CPU: 800 MHz processor; dedicated graphics
- Memory: 1 GB, microSD (TransFlash), up to 32 GB
- Removable storage: MicroSD
- Battery: Standard battery, Li-Ion 1500 mAh
- Rear camera: 5 Megapixels (Back)
- Front camera: video call (Front)
- Display: AMOLED resistive touchscreen, 16M colors, 800x480 pixels, 3.5 inches, Advanced Resistive touchscreen display, DNSe (Digital Natural Sound Engine), Accelerometer sensor for auto-rotate
- Connectivity: USB 2.0, Bluetooth v2.0 with A2DP, Wi-Fi b/g (DLNA)
- Data inputs: Full Physical and Virtual QWERTY keyboard

Samsung B7610 (also known as Samsung Omnia Pro B7610) is a smartphone produced by Samsung as part of their Omnia Series line of mobile phones. The B7610 Omnia^{PRO} runs Windows Mobile 6.1 or 6.5 Professional, with a TouchWiz 2.0 user interface. The phone has a physical and virtual QWERTY keyboard.

Its capabilities include: a Global Positioning System receiver with maps and optional turn-by-turn navigation; an autofocus 5-megapixel digital camera with LED flash, flash, video recording and video conferencing; wireless connectivity via HSDPA, DLNA, Wi-Fi 802.11 b/g and Bluetooth; a portable media player with the ability to download files over the air; Composite Video output via optional cable; multi-tasking to allow several applications to run simultaneously; a web browser with support for HTML, JavaScript and Adobe Flash; messaging via SMS, MMS and e-mail; Office suite and organizer functions; and the ability to install and run third party Java ME or Windows Mobile applications.

== History ==
The Samsung B7610 Omnia^{PRO} is featured by Samsung in an event held at CommunicAsia 2009 in the month of June and was reported to be available in July.

== Specification sheet ==
Feature	Specification
Form factor	Slider (Full Touchscreen with QWERTY Keyboard)
Operating System	Microsoft Windows Mobile 6.1 Professional, TouchWiz 2.0, upgradeable to Windows Mobile 6.5
Screen	AMOLED resistive touchscreen, 16M colors, 800 x 480 pixels, 3.5 inches
Size	112.6 x 57.8 x 16.2 mm
CPU	Samsung S3C6410 800 MHz processor; dedicated graphics
Internal Dynamic Memory (RAM)	256 MB
Internal Flash Memory	2 GB, microSD (TransFlash), up to 32 GB
Camera	5 MP, 2592 x 1944 pixels, autofocus, LED flash, Geo-tagging, Panorama shot, Best shot
Video recording	Yes @ 30fps
Graphics	Dedicated Graphics
Memory card slot	Yes, microSD/microSDHC (up to 32 GB)
Bluetooth	Yes, 2.0
GPS	Yes, uses A-GPS support
Wi-Fi	Yes, with wireless LAN (802.11 b/g), (DLNA)
Data cable support	Yes, USB 2.0 via micro USB port
Email	Yes
Calendar	Synchronization with Microsoft Exchange Server is possible with either ActiveSync with a PC or Outlook Mobile Access via Internet
Music player	Yes, DNSe (Digital Natural Sound Engine)
Video Player/editor	Yes
Ringtones	Yes, MP3/AAC/AAC+/eAAC+/WMA/M4A
HF speakerphone	Yes, with 3.5 mm audio jack and 2.1A2DP wireless stereo headphone support
Offline mode	Yes
Battery	Standard battery, Li-Ion 1500 mAh
Radio	Yes, uses included wired headset as an antenna
SAR US	0.19 W/kg (head), 0.63 W/kg (body)
SAR EUR	0.41 W/kg (head)
