= ZTE Orbit =

2012 mobile phone model

- Manufacturer: ZTE
- Type: Touchscreen smartphone
- First released: September 2012
- Compatible networks: 2.5G GSM/GPRS/EDGE – 850, 900, 1800, 1900 MHz (ZTE Render) 2.5G CDMA – 850, 1900 MHz; 3G UMTS/HSDPA 7.2 Mbit/s – 900, 2100 MHz (ZTE Render) 3G CDMA2000/1xEV-DO 3.1 Mbit/s – 800, 1900 MHz
- Form factor: Bar
- Dimensions: 119.4 mm (4.70 in) H 63.5 mm (2.50 in) W 10.2 mm (0.40 in) D
- Weight: 136 g (4.8 oz)
- Operating system: Windows Phone 7.5
- CPU: 1 GHz single core Qualcomm S1 MSM7227A-1
- GPU: Adreno 200
- Memory: 512 MB RAM
- Storage: 4 GB internal flash and 7 GB free in SkyDrive
- Battery: User serviceable 1600 mAh Li-poly battery
- Rear camera: 5 MP, 720p video capture @ 30 fps
- Display: 4.0 in (100 mm) WVGA TFT, 800 x 480 pixels at 233 ppi, 15:9 aspect ratio, Color depth 16 bit, 65k colors, 60 Hz refresh rate
- Connectivity: List: Wi-Fi :802.11 b/g/n with Wi-Fi Direct; Assisted global positioning system (aGPS); Bluetooth 2.1 + EDR; Micro-USB 2.0; Near Field Communication (NFC)
- Data inputs: Multi-touch capacitive touchscreen, proximity sensor, and light sensor.
- Other: Talk time: Up to 12.6 hours Standby time: Up to 530 hours (approx. 22 days)

The ZTE Orbit (also known as the ZTE Render) is a budget smartphone developed by ZTE that runs Microsoft's Windows Phone 7.5 operating system. It was announced on February 27, 2012 and became available in September 2012. The Orbit is the first Windows Phone device to include near field communication. In late September 2012 it was announced a CDMA variant of the Orbit would also launch as the ZTE Render in the US on US Cellular.

== Primary features ==
The primary features of the Orbit are:

- 4.0in 800x480 TFT touchscreen display with 233 PPI
- 5 MP primary camera
- 720p video recording
- Near field communications (NFC)

== Availability ==
The Orbit was announced at the Mobile World Congress in 2012 as ZTE's second Windows Phone after the ZTE Tania and launched in September 2012. It is targeted primarily at emerging markets as well as East Asia. The Orbit was also announced as one of the launch devices for the Windows Phone platform in China alongside the HTC Titan and a variant of the Nokia Lumia 800. In the United States the Orbit launched as a carrier exclusive on US Cellular as the ZTE Render where it was also eventually updated to Windows Phone 7.8.

== Reception ==
The Orbit received mixed reviews upon its announcement and launch. Reviewers noted the relatively low price for the device and that it was targeted for emerging markets and for low cost no-contract sales in the developed world. The device was praised for its speed, build quality, aesthetic design, and the presence of NFC, however its thickness, touch screen quality, low brightness levels, and lack of apps that utilize NFC were areas of concern. Additionally, the device was compared to the Nokia Lumia 610 which launched as a direct competitor.
