= Samsung B7330 Omnia Pro =

Cell phone model

Samsung Omnia^{PRO} B7330
- Manufacturer: Samsung
- Series: Samsung Omnia Series
- Availability by region: October 2009; 16 years ago
- Predecessor: Samsung Omnia^{PRO} B7320
- Related: Samsung Omnia^{PRO} B7320
- Compatible networks: HSDPA (3.5G), Quad band GSM / GPRS / EDGE GSM 850, GSM 900, GSM 1800, GSM 1900
- Form factor: Candybar
- Dimensions: 114.9×59×10.7 mm (4.52×2.32×0.42 in)
- Weight: 109 g (4 oz)
- Operating system: Microsoft Windows Mobile 6.5 Standard
- CPU: ARM1136EJS
- Memory: Phone Memory: 200MB, Storage Memory: 400MB
- Removable storage: microSD up to 32GB
- Battery: 3.7V 1500 mAh Li-Ion
- Rear camera: 3.2 megapixels (back)
- Front camera: Video call (front)
- Display: 2.62 inch 320 × 320 65K colors TFT LCD
- Connectivity: USB 2.0, Bluetooth v2.0 with A2DP, Wi-Fi b/g (DLNA), Internet Explorer Mobile 6.0
- Data inputs: QWERTY keyboard
- Development status: Active
- Other: Windows Media Player 10 Mobile, ArcSoft Streaming Player

Samsung GT-B7330 (also known as Omnia Pro B7330) is a smartphone produced by Samsung as part of their Omnia series line of mobile phones. It runs Windows Mobile 6.5 Standard, and has a QWERTY keyboard. The predecessor of this phone is the Samsung Omnia^{PRO} B7320. It was released in October 2009.

== Features ==
=== Main features ===
- GSM Quad band (850/900/1800/1900 MHz)
- EDGE network
- 3.5G
- Wi-Fi
- Bluetooth
- AGPS
- Speakerphone
- Phone Memory: 200 MB, Storage Memory: 400 MB
- Memory card slot (microSD up to 32 GB)
- Microsoft Office Mobile
- Internet Explorer Mobile 6.0
- Adobe Reader LE
- Windows Mobile 6.5 Standard
- FM radio with RDS
- 3.2 Megapixel camera
- Video recording (320×240 pixels)
- SMS
- MMS
- Email
- Calendar
- Contacts
- Scheduler
- Offline mode
- Microsoft ActiveSync
- Alarm
- Audio notes
- Calculator
- Converter (Currency, Length, Weight, Volume, Area, Temperature)
- Search
- Smart reader
- Stopwatch
- Tasks
- Tip calculator
- World clock
- Games
- Java MIDP 2.1
- Music Player
- Call History
- Photo Slides
- Podcast reader
- RSS feeds reader
- Speed dial
- Streaming Player
- Windows Media
- Task Manager
- Voice notes
- Facebook
- Windows Marketplace for Mobile
- Windows Live (Hotmail, Messenger, Spaces, Search, Contacts)
- Microsoft My Phone
- Multi-task
- Minimize windows

=== Special features ===
- Pressure-sensitive navigation key (up & down only)

=== Home screen ===
From this device's default home screen, the user can check the weather, play songs, update CNN headlines, view photos, configure device settings, and go to social-networking sites like Facebook, Myspace, and YouTube. However, if the home screen is changed from 'Samsung WizPro' (which is the default home screen layout) to other layouts (like 'Windows Basic'), these features will be unavailable until the home screen layout is changed back to the default.
