= LG Quantum =

Smartphone model

LG Quantum (Optimus 7Q)
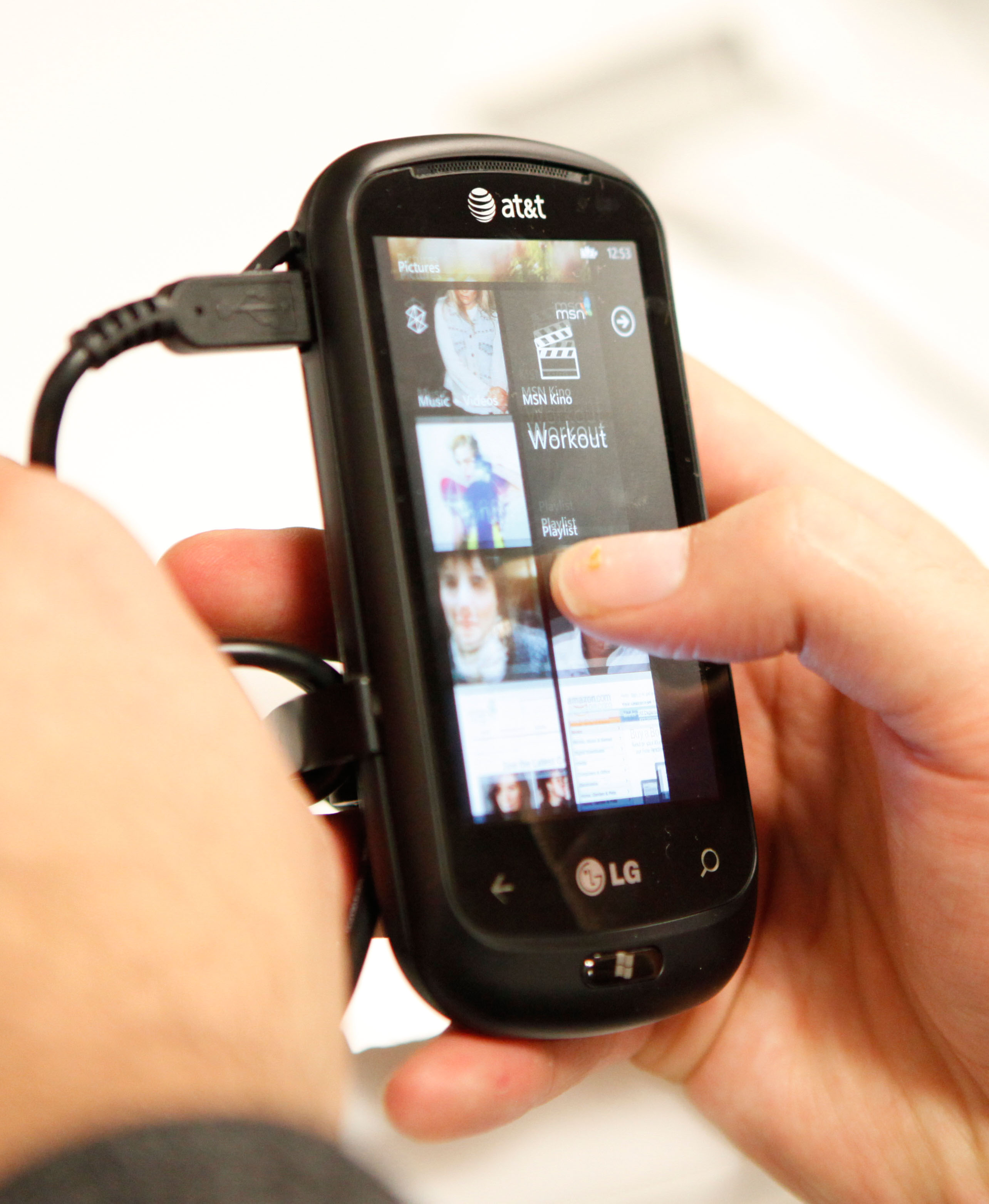
- Manufacturer: LG
- Compatible networks: AT&T Mobility; Telstra; Bell Canada
- Form factor: QWERTY slider smartphone
- Dimensions: 4.70” (H) x 2.34” (W) x 0.60” (D)
- Weight: 6.27 oz (178 g)
- Operating system: Windows Phone
- CPU: Qualcomm QSD8250 1GHz Scorpion (Snapdragon)
- Memory: 512 MB RAM
- Storage: 16GB ROM
- Removable storage: 16gb
- Rear camera: 5-megapixel autofocus with flash, rear-facing
- Front camera: None
- Display: 3.5-inch (diagonal) widescreen 480-by-800 WVGA
- Connectivity: UMTS/HSDPA Tri-band (850/1900/2100 MHz) GSM/GPRS/EDGE
- Data inputs: Multi-touch touchscreen display Dual microphone 3-axis accelerometer Digital compass Proximity sensor Ambient light sensor
- Codename: Pacific
- Development status: Available
- Other: Wi-Fi, FM-Radio, GPS

The LG Quantum or Optimus 7Q (also known as the C900) is a slider smartphone which runs Microsoft's Windows Phone operating system. The LG Quantum was launched November 8, 2010 on AT&T. The C900 ran the Windows Phone 7.0 operating system out-of-the-box and was later updated to Windows Phone 7.5. The C900 also supports the Windows Phone 7.8 update which launched which offers the new Windows Phone 8.0 style tiles and other improvements. It is possible to upgrade it using an alternate method.

== Features ==
=== Display ===
The Quantum features a 3.5" TFT capacitive touch screen with a resolution of 480 x 800 pixels.

=== Processor and memory ===
The Quantum is powered by a Qualcomm QSD8250 1 GHz Scorpion (Snapdragon) and has 512 MB RAM and a 512 MB ROM.

=== Storage ===
The Quantum has 16 GB of built in storage but no expandable storage (e.g. SD card).

=== Camera ===
The Quantum has a rear-facing 5-megapixel camera with auto focus, LED flash and records 720p video at 24 frames per second.

=== Smartphone connectivity ===
The device runs on AT&T's 3G network. It also offers WiFi as another means on connection to the Internet. The phone comes with built-in Bluetooth 2.1 and a MicroUSB slot to plug in a MicroUSB to USB wire which can be used to connect the device to the computer or to the wall charger.

=== Battery and power ===
The Quantum comes with a 1500mAh battery is user-replaceable by removing the back cover. The average talk and standby time are 7 and 350 hours respectively.

=== Keyboard and Buttons ===
The Quantum is one of the few Windows Phones sporting a slide-out QWERTY keyboard. This keyboard is unique as its shift and function ("fn") keys are their own separate buttons. They are next to the keyboard, not integrated as keys. The keyboard is particularly large, which makes it easy for people with larger hands to use.

Other Windows Phones with physical keyboards are the Dell Venue Pro and HTC 7 Pro, making it a rare-breed of Windows Phone.

The Quantum is also one of the only Windows Phones with a physical Start button, rather than the capacitive buttons seen on other Windows Phones.

== See also ==
- Windows Phone
