= Samsung Display =

South Korean manufacturing company

Samsung Display Co., Ltd.
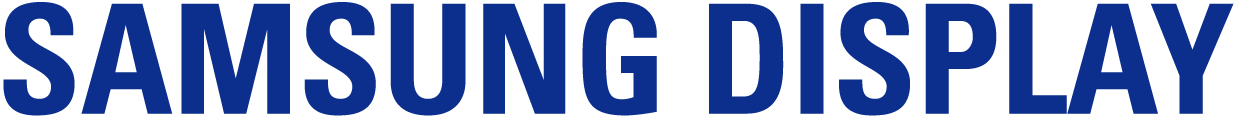
- Native name: 삼성디스플레이
- Industry: Electronics
- Founded: April 1, 2012
- Headquarters: 1, Samsung-ro, Giheung-gu, Gyeonggi Province, South Korea
- Key people: Chung Yi: President
- Products: OLED/QD-OLED panels
- Revenue: $ 25.98 billion (2022)
- Parent: Samsung Electronics
- Website: www.samsungdisplay.com/eng/index.jsp

Samsung Display Co., Ltd. (Korean: 삼성디스플레이) is a manufacturer of OLED and QD-OLED panels, and former manufacturer of liquid crystal displays (LCDs). Display markets include smartphones, TVs, laptops, computer monitors, smartwatches, virtual reality, handheld game consoles, and automotive applications.

Headquartered in South Korea, Samsung Display has production plants in China, Vietnam, and India, and operates sales offices in six countries. Samsung Display enabled the first mass-production of OLED and quantum dot displays and aims to develop next-generation technology such as slidable, rollable and stretchable panels.

The company was established as S-LCD Corporation in April 2004 in Chungcheongnam-do as a joint venture between Samsung Electronics (51% share) and Sony Corporation (49% share) to manufacture amorphous TFT LCD panels. As of April 2008 the company reported a monthly production capacity of 150,000 LCD panels, including 50,000 based on PVA technology, which were integrated into both Samsung and Sony LCD televisions. S-LCD originally had production facilities in both Japan and South Korea. Samsung later acquired all of Sony's shares in S-LCD in January 2012.

Samsung Display Corporation was established on April 1, 2012. The company launched on July 1 by merging S-LCD Corporation and Samsung Mobile Display (Samsung's OLED manufacturing division), becoming the world's largest display company. Samsung Display ended its manufacturing of LCD panels in June 2022, becoming a manufacturer of solely OLED panels.

As of 2025, Samsung Display held 68 million shares in Corning Inc., resulting from its CRT glass joint venture with the company in the past.

== History timeline ==
- January 1991: Samsung Electronics launched TFT-LCD business.
- February 1995: Operated TFT-LCD line for the first time domestically
- November 2003: Invested for 4.5 generation AMOLED mass-production for the first time in the world
- July 2004: A joint venture S-LCD Corporation between Samsung Electronics and Sony Corporation was established.
- April 2005: S-LCD begins shipment of seventh-generation TFT LCD panels for LCD TVs.
- August 2007: S-LCD begins shipment of eighth-generation TFT LCD panels for LCD TVs.
- October 2007: Started to mass produce AMOLED for the first time in the world
- March 2009: Exceed production of AMOLED one million monthly
- December 26, 2011: The company's partners announce that Samsung will acquire Sony's entire stake in the joint venture, making S-LCD Corporation a wholly owned subsidiary of Samsung Electronics.
- January 19, 2012: Acquisition of Sony's shares completed for 1.07 trillion Korean won (72 billion Japanese yen) in cash.
- July 1, 2012: S-LCD and Samsung Mobile Display merge to create Samsung Display.
- August 2014: Samsung Display mass-produced the world’s first curved edge display panel, featured in the Galaxy Note Edge.
- September 2015: Mass-produced circular OLED for smartwatches
- July 2016: World’s first mass-production of embedded Y-OCTA
- April 2019: Samsung Display mass-produced and commercialized foldable displays.
- April 2021: Samsung Display's LCD factory in Suzhou, China, is sold to TCL Technology's China Star Optoelectronics Technology.
- November 2021: Samsung Display started to produce QD-OLED displays.
- January 4, 2022: Sony announces its A95K television that uses Samsung Display's QD-OLED panels.
- March 17, 2022: Samsung Electronics announces its S95B television that uses Samsung Display's QD-OLED panels.
- June 2022: Samsung Display terminates its LCD business. Samsung Display sold its LCD patents to TCL Technology's China Star Optoelectronics Technology.

== Corporate governance ==
As of September 2022.

Shareholder	Stake (%)	Flag
Samsung Electronics	84.80%	South Korea
Samsung SDI	15.20%	South Korea

== Company agent ==
- CEO Chung Yi (이청)
