= Samsung i900 Omnia =

Smartphone created by Samsung Mobile

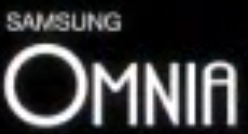

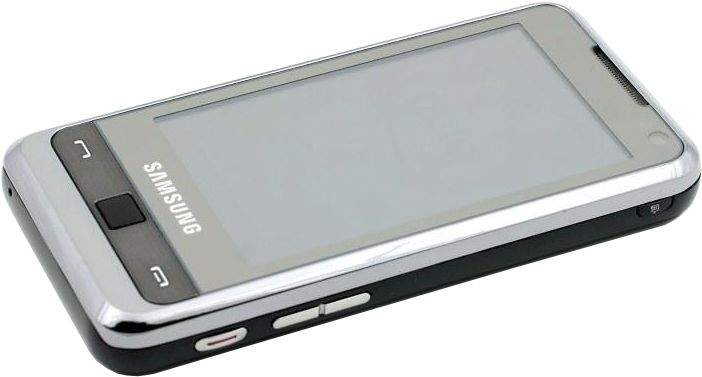
- Manufacturer: Samsung
- Series: Samsung Omnia Series
- Availability by region: 2008 (except Canada) 2009 (Canada)
- Discontinued: 2009-10
- Successor: Samsung i8000 Omnia II
- Compatible networks: AGPS, HSDPA (3.5G), Quad band GSM / GPRS / EDGE GSM 850, GSM 900, GSM 1800, GSM 1900
- Form factor: Candybar
- Dimensions: 112×56.9×12.5 mm (4.41×2.24×0.49 in)
- Weight: 127 g (4 oz)
- Operating system: Microsoft Windows Mobile 6.1 Professional
- CPU: 624MHz Marvell PXA312 processor.
- Memory: 128 MB RAM, 256 MB ROM
- Storage: 8 GB/16 GB
- Removable storage: MicroSD (TransFlash)
- Battery: Li-Ion (1440 mAh)
- Rear camera: 5 Megapixels (Back) and VGA Video Recording
- Front camera: 3G Video Calling (Front)
- Display: 240x400 px (rotatable), 3.2 in, TFT LCD, Touch Screen
- Connectivity: USB 2.0, Bluetooth 2.0 with A2DP, Wi-Fi b/g,
- Data inputs: Touchscreen, Optical “Finger-Mouse” sensor, Buttons
- Codename: GrandPrix
- Hearing aid compatibility: M4

The Samsung SGH-i900, also known as Omnia I or WiTu (in Russia only), is a smartphone created by Samsung Mobile. Announced in June 2008, the Omnia was launched in Singapore in mid-June, available in stores on the 20th of June, and in the rest of Asia in July. For some parts of Europe, it was launched in August. It was made available for the United States in December 2008 through Verizon Wireless and for Canada in April 2009 through Telus Mobility.

The Omnia was Samsung Mobile's top-of-the-line flagship handset. It runs on Windows Mobile 6.1 Professional, but comes other applications preinstalled to make its GUI and its functions distinguishable from others running the same platform:

- Samsung Today Screen 1 (alternative home screen UI)
- Samsung Today Screen 2 (similar to Samsung Today Screen 1)
- Samsung Touch Wiz UI (alternative application menu with a widget bar and widgets)

All these applications have the ability to be controlled by sliding the finger across the screen. The third Today Screen has gained interest because of its control method. It uses about a fourth of the screen on the left side to hold a bar of widgets that can be scrolled up and down. The rest of the screen is customizable, as widgets can be pulled out of the sidebar and onto the main screen to be expanded for quick use.

== Camera ==
The Samsung Omnia has a 5.0-megapixel camera with autofocus and LED flash. Additionally Samsung Omnia supports VGA resolution video recording with about 20 - 25 frame/s. Samsung Omnia's front-facing 3G camera has a resolution of 0.3 megapixels (VGA).

== Korean edition (T*Omnia) ==
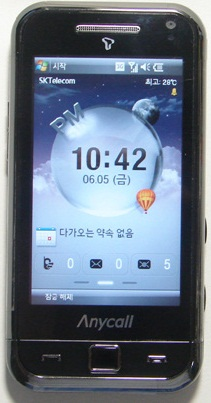

SK Telecom and Samsung announced a Korean edition of Samsung Omnia, T*Omnia or SCH-M490. T is a brand name marketed by SK Telecom. The hardware has been upgraded to have a 3.3-inch (84 mm) Wide VGA (800 x 480) LCD screen and a PXA312 CPU that automatically overclocks up to 806 MHz. An S-DMB tuner has replaced the TV-out and FM tuner. The 4 GB version (SCH-M490) is priced at KRW68,000, and the 16 GB (SCH-M495) at KRW1,078,000 including 10% VAT.

== Japanese edition (930SC) ==
In Japan, SoftBank Mobile announced that the Samsung Omnia will be sold as 930SC in November 2008. However, it adopted the proprietary operating system instead of Windows Mobile. It has a 3.3-inch (84 mm) Wide VGA LCD and 1seg tuner, but GPS has been excluded. It is also available for SoftBank Mobile's own mobile Internet service.

== North American edition (SCH-i910) ==
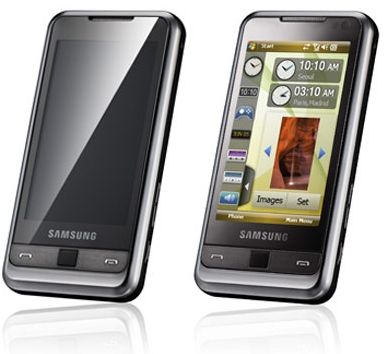

The Samsung Omnia has been released under the version name SCH-i910 in North America, with Verizon Wireless as the network operator. The SCH-i910 has a speaker on the back and has CDMA2000 instead of the GSM radio. The SCH-i910 still runs Windows Mobile 6.1 along with some added software such as Visual Voicemail. Most other features stay the same as the SCH-i900. Most noticeably, the i910 does not include the secondary VGA camera on the front; presumably due to the lack of support for video calls in North America. The North American version of the phone uses the same 624 MHz chip used by other versions. This has been confirmed by numerous North American users through the "settings" menu on the Omnia.

Canadian service provider Telus Mobility launched the CDMA2000 Samsung Omnia on April 3, 2009.

Canadian service provider Bell Mobility launched the CDMA2000 Samsung Omnia on April 9, 2009

== Verizon software update ==
- On July 16, 2009, the CF03 Software Update became available for Verizon Omnia users which includes operating system updates and unlocks the GPS device so that third-party applications (such as Google Maps) can use it.
- Currently the only legal versions of Windows Mobile that the phone can run are Versions 6.0 and 6.1 (Professional)

== Omnia II (GT-i8000) ==
A new model with improved specifications and design called the i8000 Samsung Omnia II. Samsung Omnia II GT-I8000(H/L/U) is a multimedia smartphone announced at Samsung Unpacked on June 15, 2009. Earlier Omnia II releases runs Windows Mobile 6.1, however it's upgradable to version 6.5. There is also an unofficial and highly experimental Android version available. Verizon is the official US carrier for this phone and released it in December 2009.

== TMC ==
One can use an external device (as the Royaltek TMC receiver) to use TMC information.

== See also ==
- Samsung i8510 Innov8
- Samsung M8800 Pixon
- Samsung i780
- Samsung F480 Tocco
- HTC Touch Diamond
- Sony Ericsson Xperia X1
- Nokia 5800 XpressMusic
- iPhone 3G
- LG Viewty
- mini-USB
