= Samsung Focus =

Smartphone from 2010

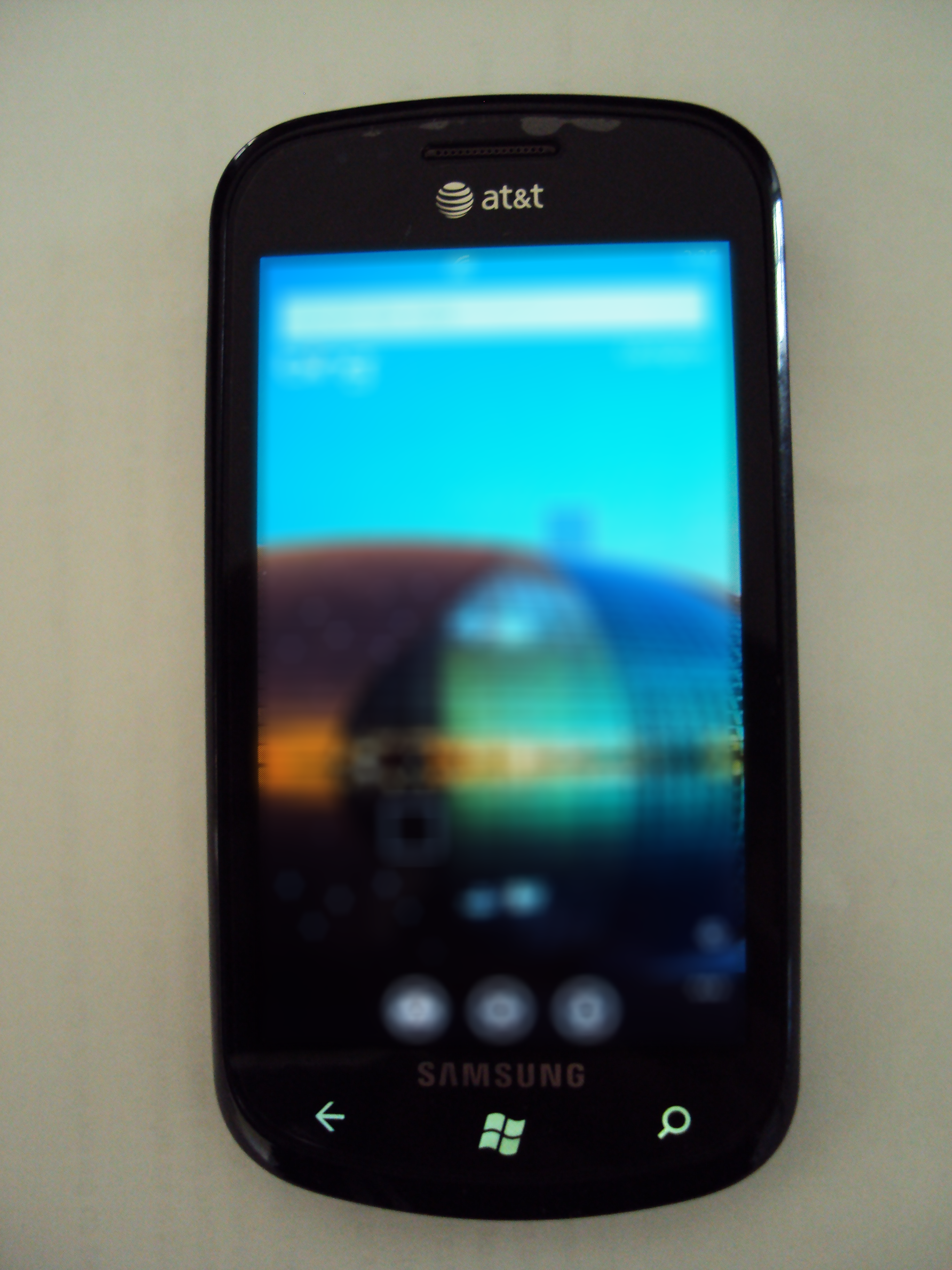
- Manufacturer: Samsung
- Availability by region: November 8, 2010
- Successor: Samsung Focus S
- Related: Samsung Galaxy S1
- Compatible networks: AT&T Mobility; Rogers Wireless
- Form factor: Slate smartphone
- Dimensions: 4.84 x 2.56 x 0.39 (123 x 65 x 10 mm)
- Weight: 4.07 oz (115 g)
- Operating system: Windows Phone
- CPU: Qualcomm QSD8250 1GHz Scorpion Snapdragon, Adreno 200 GPU
- Memory: 512 MB RAM; 1 GB ROM
- Storage: 8 GB
- Removable storage: microSDHC (up to 32 GB)
- Battery: 1500mAh Li-ion; Talk: up to 6.5 hrs Standby: up to 300 hrs
- Rear camera: 5 MP with autofocus 48× digital zoom 720p HD video recording LED flash Geotagging; Image stabilization
- Front camera: None
- Display: 4-inch (diagonal) widescreen Super AMOLED; 480-by-800 WVGA
- Connectivity: Quad-band GSM/GPRS/EDGE (850 900 1800 1900 MHz); Tri-band UMTS/HSDPA (850 1900 2100 MHz); Wi-Fi (802.11 b/g/n); Bluetooth 2.1 + EDR; A-GPS; FM radio
- Data inputs: Multi-touch touchscreen display Dual microphone 3-axis accelerometer Digital compass Proximity sensor Ambient light sensor

The Samsung Focus (also known as the SGH-i917 and Samsung Cetus) is a slate-sized smartphone which runs Microsoft's Windows Phone operating system. It features a 1 GHz Qualcomm® Snapdragon™ processor, a 4.0-inch Super AMOLED screen, and 8 GB of internal storage (expandable to 40 GB with a 32 GB microSD card). As of November 2011, it is the 4th lightest and thinnest Windows Phone, behind the Samsung Focus Flash, HTC Titan and the Samsung Focus S.

== History ==
=== Release and marketing ===
The Focus was released on November 8, 2010, along with the HTC Surround on AT&T. It was marketed by Samsung as being the only Windows Phone to feature a microSD card slot.

The Focus was also released on November 8, 2010, on Rogers Wireless in Canada, Rogers handsets differ in appearance as they lack carrier branding instead of having the Samsung logo appear at the top where the AT&T logo would normally appear. The Samsung Focus is no longer available on Rogers Wireless as of March 20, 2012.

=== Successor ===
The successor to the Focus is the Samsung Focus S, released in November 2011, featuring a larger 4.3 inch Super AMOLED Plus display. The Samsung Focus Flash is also listed as a successor in the US; in other countries, however, it is a successor to the Omnia.

== Features ==
=== Display ===
The Samsung Focus features a Corning Gorilla glass, Super AMOLED display like its Galaxy S cousins. The display is much brighter than LCDs and reduces power consumption. The high contrast ratio between dark and light colors produces exceptional quality even in sunlight. The nature of the capacitive touchscreen can cause some issues as some have noted placing the phone on a plush surface will make the display very unresponsive. However normal hand-held usage is very responsive.

== Software ==
The phone was released with Windows Phone and AT&T Navigator, AT&T Radio, AT&T myWireless and AT&T Uverse which can be uninstalled. The device also shipped with Samsung's "Now", also known as, "Daily Briefing" application which displays weather, news, and stocks. The phone is capable of upgrading to Windows Phone 7.5 (Mango).

=== Languages ===
At the time of its launch, the Rogers version supported English and French, while the AT&T version also supported German, Spanish, and Italian. The Windows Phone 7.5 update added support for Korean to both variants.

== Reception ==
The Samsung Focus received positive reviews. It received a 7 out of 10 rating from Engadget stating, "The Focus is kind of the everyman of the Windows Phone line. It doesn't really have any fancy features and isn't especially stylish... but it gets the job done ... At the end of the day, a lot of people will find that the Focus hits the sweet spot – for us, it just slightly misses the mark." CNET gave the phone 4 out of 5 stars and stated, "Anyone looking for an alternative to the iPhone, but who wants better multimedia features and a more organized user interface than Android offers, should look at the Samsung Focus ... which has all that plus solid performance and a sleek design."

Gizmodo praised the phone for its Super AMOLED display and the thinness and lightness of the device although noting, "The glossy plastic and fake chrome isn't just tacky, it makes a phone loaded with high-end technology feel cheap. SlashGear said that the Focus "might well be the best Windows Phone device in the (North American) market." PC Magazine said that the Samsung Focus is "probably the best of the Windows phones." In its annual Readers' Choice Awards 2011, PC Magazine gave the Samsung Focus the highest overall score among AT&T smartphones, besting the Apple iPhone.

== Expandable storage issues ==
The Focus is marketed as the only Windows Phone that has a microSD card slot but many users found that installation can be tricky. The SD card used in the Samsung Focus must meet certain performance requirements, such as random read and write speeds, which cannot be determined with the speed class alone. When inserting a new SD card into the Samsung Focus, the phone must be reformatted and reset to factory settings. AT&T has informed customers to buy a "Samsung Focus approved" microSD card in order to use the slot. After inserting an SD card, one cannot remove it as the card integrates with the phone's memory; doing so will completely erase the phone along with the card.

== See also ==
- Samsung Focus S
- Windows Phone
