= HTC 7 Surround =

Smartphone manufactured by HTC

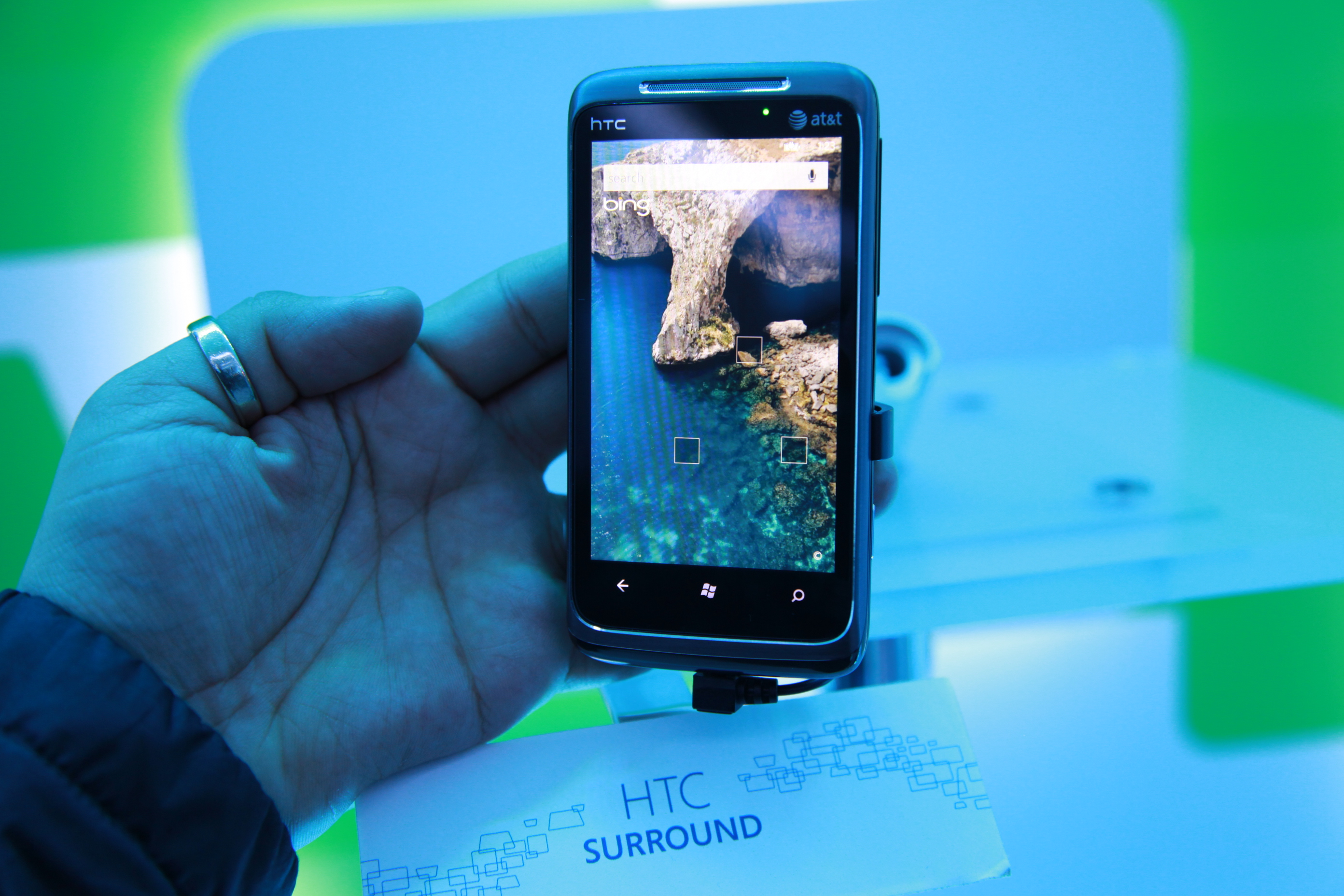
- Manufacturer: HTC Corporation
- Availability by region: November 8, 2010
- Related: HTC Mozart, Nexus One
- Compatible networks: AT&T Mobility Telus Communications
- Form factor: Slate smartphone
- Dimensions: 119.7 mm (4.71 in) (h); 61.5 mm (2.42 in) (w); 12.97 mm (0.511 in) (d)
- Weight: 165 g (5.82 oz)
- Operating system: Windows Phone 7
- CPU: Qualcomm QSD8250 1GHz Scorpion (Snapdragon)
- Memory: 448 MB RAM
- Storage: 512 MB ROM
- Removable storage: 16 GB microSD
- Battery: 1230 mAh Lithium-ion battery
- Rear camera: 5-megapixel autofocus with flash, rear-facing
- Front camera: None
- Display: 3.8-inch (diagonal) widescreen 480-by-800 WVGA
- Connectivity: Quad-band UMTS 2100/1900/850 + GSM GPRS EDGE 850/900/1800/1900
- Data inputs: Multi-touch touchscreen display Dual microphone 3-axis accelerometer Digital compass Proximity sensor Ambient light sensor
- Codename: Mondrian
- Development status: Available
- Other: Wi-Fi, Kickstand, Slide out speakers, FM-Radio, GPS

The HTC 7 Surround (also known as the HTC Surround and HTC T8788) is a smartphone created by HTC running on the Windows Phone 7 operating system. The HTC Surround launched on November 8, 2010 on AT&T.

== History ==
=== Release ===
The Surround was released on November 8, 2010. Initial sales data has not been reported.

== Features ==
The HTC Surround, like its European cousin, the HTC Mozart, was one of the first phones to use the Windows Phone 7 OS. Its main feature is its slide-out speaker, which also reveals a kick stand. It is based on the Nexus One.

=== Screen and input ===
The HTC Surround uses a modest 3.8 inch WVGA LCD touchscreen with a resolution of 480 x 800 pixels. It can produce up to 16 million colors. The display is designed to be used with a bare finger or multiple fingers at one time for multi-touch sensing.

The Surround has 6 hardware buttons: 3 physical and 3 touch. It has a dedicated power button, camera button, and a volume rocker. The device also has a back button, a home button and a search button. The back button takes the user back to the previous application or screen. The home button brings the user to the home screen. The search button opens up a Bing search screen.

The device contains a GPS chip to show the location of the phone, a proximity sensor to turn the screen off during phone calls so that the face doesn't accidentally click the screen, a G-sensor, an ambient light sensor to dim the light in dark rooms and increase the brightness in direct sunlight, and a digital compass.

=== Processor and memory ===
The Surround uses a 1 GHz Qualcomm QSD8250 Snapdragon Chipset. It features 512 MB of ROM and 448 MB of RAM.

=== Cameras ===
The surround comes with a 5-megapixel camera with built-in auto focus and flash located on the rear of the phone. The camera can also shoot in 720p HD at 24 frames per second.

=== Storage ===
As is with most other Windows Phone phones, the HTC Surround does not support external memory officially. The phone comes with 16 GB of memory: in the form of a 16 GB internal MicroSD card. The internal MicroSD card can be removed and replaced with a bigger one, though.

=== Audio and output ===
Audio is undoubtedly the most distinguishing aspect of the HTC Surround. When the phone is slid open, the Dolby powered speakers are shown. Most people have been underwhelmed with the speakers stating that "The overall volume of the speakers was enough to fill a small room, but not 'take the party to another level,' as HTC claims on its website." Engadget writes that "there's a lot of promise here, but unless the phone delivers the extra size and weight simply won't be worth it. Unfortunately, we're here to report... that they're simply not worth it."

=== Smartphone connectivity ===
The device runs on AT&T's 3G network. It also offers WiFi as another means on connection to the internet. The phone comes with built-in Bluetooth 2.1 and a MicroUSB slot to plug in a MicroUSB to USB wire which can be used to connect the device to the computer or to the wall charger. WiFi tethering, initially not supported, has been added with Windows Phone 7.5 but AT&T has yet to push the firmware update from HTC.

=== Battery and power ===
The Surround comes with a 1230mAh battery is user-replaceable by removing the back cover. The average talk and standby time are 4.16 and 255 hours respectively.

== Software ==
The device, shipped with Windows Phone 7 as its operating system, was updated in September 2011 to Windows Phone 7.5 codename Mango. It has a number of HTC exclusive apps available.
