= Samsung Focus S =

Samsung phone from 2011

- Manufacturer: Samsung
- First released: November 6, 2011
- Predecessor: Samsung Focus
- Successor: Samsung ATIV S
- Related: Samsung Galaxy S2
- Compatible networks: GSM 850; GSM 900; GSM 1800; GSM 1900; Edge; UMTS 850; UMTS 1900; UMTS 2100
- Form factor: Slate / smartphone
- Dimensions: 126×66.8×8.5 mm (4.96×2.63×0.33 in) (4.96" L * 2.63" W * 0.33" D)
- Weight: 110.6 g (3.9 oz)
- Operating system: Windows Phone (with Mango)
- CPU: 1.4 GHz Qualcomm MSM8255 Snapdragon, Adreno 205 GPU
- Memory: 1GB RAM
- Storage: 16 GB
- Removable storage: None
- Battery: Li-ion 1650 mAh; Talk: up to 6.5 hrs Standby: up to 250 hrs
- Rear camera: 8 MP with autofocus 5× digital zoom 720p HD video recording LED flash Geotagging; Image stabilization Smile detection
- Front camera: 1.3 MP front-facing camera
- Display: 4.27-inch (diagonal) widescreen Super AMOLED Plus; 480-by-800 WVGA
- Data inputs: Multi-touch display Dual microphone 3-axis accelerometer Digital compass Proximity sensor Ambient light sensor

The Samsung Focus S is a slate smartphone that runs Microsoft's Windows Phone 7.5 (code-named "Mango") operating system. It is the successor to the Samsung Focus, and was released on November 6, 2011, in the United States. Currently, the Focus S is available exclusively through AT&T.

== Hardware and Display ==
The display is a 4.3-inch, WVGA (480 × 800 pixel) display. Unlike some former models, it uses a standard RGB layout instead of PenTile. The display has a high viewing angle. Below the display are three capacitive buttons for back, Start, and search, as seen on most Windows Phones. Above it is the earpiece, light sensors, and afront-facing camera. The sides of the phone are home to a dual-stage camera key, power/sleep/unlock key (right side), and volume rocker (left side).

The Samsung Focus S is powered by a 1.4 GHz Qualcomm processor.

== Software ==
The device ships with Windows Phone 7.5 and can be upgraded to Windows Phone Tango (build 8773).

=== Languages ===
Unlike its Android counterpart, the Samsung Galaxy S II, the Focus S supports more languages out of the box.

- Czech
- Danish
- German (Germany)
- German (Austria)
- German (Switzerland)
- English (Australia)
- English (Ireland)
- English (New Zealand)
- English (South Africa)
- English (United Kingdom)
- English (United States)
- Spanish (Spain)
- Spanish (United States)
- French (France)
- French (Switzerland)
- Italian
- Hungarian
- Dutch (Belgium)
- Dutch (Netherlands)
- Norwegian Bokmål
- Polish
- Portuguese (Brazil)
- Portuguese (Portugal)
- Finnish
- Swedish
- Greek
- Russian
- Korean
- Chinese (Simplified)
- Chinese (Traditional)
- Japanese
