= Samsung Omnia W =

Electronic device

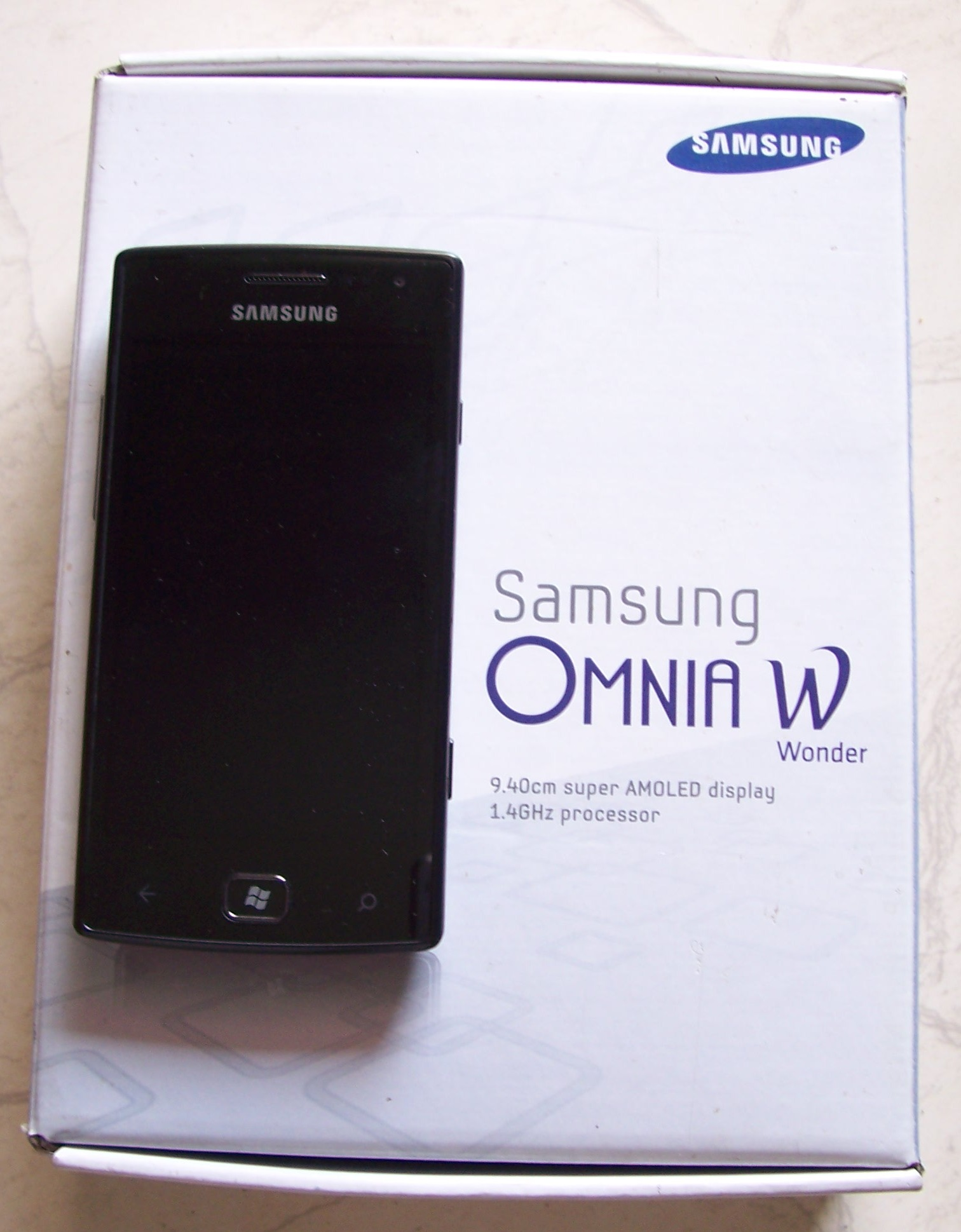
- Samsung Omnia W model GT-I8350
- Manufacturer: Samsung
- Type: Smartphone
- Series: Omnia
- Compatible networks: GSM 850/900/1800/1900; HSDPA 7.2 Mbps 900/2100
- Form factor: Slate smartphone
- Operating system: Windows Phone 7.5 Mango, (current os version: 7.10.8773.98)
- CPU: Qualcomm MSM8255 1.4 GHz Scorpion (Snapdragon)
- GPU: Adreno 205
- Memory: 512 MB RAM
- Storage: 8 GB
- Removable storage: No
- Battery: 1500 mAh
- Rear camera: 5 megapixel autofocus with LED flash, rear-facing; 720p HD video
- Front camera: 0.3 MP
- Display: 3.7-inch (diagonal) widescreen 480-by-800 WVGA Super AMOLED
- Connectivity: 3.5 millimetres (0.14 in) TRRS; Wi-Fi (802.11b/g/n); Bluetooth 2.1; USB 2.0, DLNA, FM radio with RDS
- Data inputs: Multi-touch touchscreen display Dual microphone 3-axis accelerometer gyroscope Digital compass Proximity sensor Ambient light sensor Push buttons Capacitive touch-sensitive buttons
- Development status: Discontinued
- Other: GPS, GLONASS

The Samsung Omnia W (also known as the Samsung Focus Flash and GT-I8350) is a slate device running Windows Phone operating system 7.5. The launch of the phone was first announced on September 26, 2011 and was subsequently released later that year. The phone is manufactured by Samsung. The device features Qualcomm Snapdragon MSM8255 SoC clocked at 1.4 GHz (with an Adreno 205 GPU), 3.7-inch Super AMOLED screen (protected by Corning Gorilla Glass) with a resolution of 480 × 800 and 8 GB of internal storage.

== Reception ==
Early evaluations have been favorable. One of the best (and least expensive) Windows Phone 7 devices available, according to PC World. If you have been looking for a good smartphone on a budget then this is the phone for you". The Verge rated it at a 7.1 out of 10, touting its design, software, and performance, while suffering through poor call quality and camera performance. Engadget praises the "unassuming phone", concluding that "You'll make some sacrifices on the camera, storage and battery fronts, but if you can live with that the Focus is a veritable steal".

== See also ==
- Windows Phone
