= Droid =

Droid or DROID may refer to:

- A robot, or specifically android (robot)

== Entertainment ==
- Droid (band), an American metal band
- Droid (film), a 1988 science fiction film
- Droid (Star Wars), science fictional machines from the Star Wars franchise
  - Star Wars: Droids, an animated series spin-off of the original trilogy which ran from 1985–1986 for 13 episodes and a special
  - Star Wars: Droids, two comic book limited series published in 1994–1995 by Dark Horse Comics
- Droids (role-playing game), a tabletop role-playing game
- Droids (play-by-mail game)
- Droid Bishop, Australian synthwave musician

== Smartphones ==
- Droid, a common shorthand for Android (operating system)
- Verizon Droid, brand of smartphones

=== HTC ===
- Droid DNA
- Droid Eris
- Droid Incredible
  - Droid Incredible 2
  - Droid Incredible 4G LTE

=== Motorola ===
- Motorola Droid
  - Droid 2
  - Droid 3
  - Droid 4
- Droid Bionic
- Droid Pro
- Droid X
  - Droid X2
- Droid Razr
  - Droid Razr HD
- Droid Maxx
- Droid Ultra
- Droid Mini
- Droid Turbo

=== Samsung ===
- Droid Charge

== Other uses ==
- DROID (Digital Record Object IDentification), a software tool for the PRONOM technical registry of the UK government's National Archives
- DroID, a biological database
- Droid fonts, a family of typefaces for the Android operating system
- Droid (album)

== See also ==
- Android (disambiguation)
- Gynoid
