= HTC Rhyme =

Smartphone model

- Manufacturer: HTC Corporation
- Type: Smartphone
- First released: September 22, 2011; 14 years ago
- Related: HTC Desire S, HTC ThunderBolt
- Compatible networks: 2.5G (GSM/GPRS/EDGE): 850/900/1800/1900 MHz; 3G (HSDPA 14.4 Mbit/s, HSUPA 5.76 Mbit/s): 900/1900/2100 MHz
- Form factor: Slate
- Dimensions: 119.13 mm (4.690 in) H 60.7 mm (2.39 in) W 10.9 mm (0.43 in) D
- Weight: 130 g (5 oz)
- Operating system: Android 2.3.4 (upgradable to Android 4.0)
- CPU: 1 GHz Qualcomm Snapdragon MSM8655
- GPU: Adreno 205
- Memory: 768 MB RAM
- Storage: 4.0 GB
- Removable storage: Up to 32 GB microSDHC
- Battery: 1600 mAh Lithium-ion battery
- Rear camera: Backside illumination 5 megapixel autofocus with LED flash, rear-facing
- Front camera: VGA
- Display: 94 mm (3.7 in) diagonal 480x800 (252 ppi) Super LCD
- Connectivity: Wi-Fi (802.11 b/g/n); Bluetooth 3.0; USB 2.0; DLNA; UMA
- Data inputs: Multi-touch touchscreen Dual microphone 3-axis accelerometer magnetometer Proximity sensor Ambient light sensor
- Other: Wi-Fi hotspot, FM radio

The HTC Rhyme is a multi-touch, slate-format Android 2.3 smartphone designed and produced by HTC. The Rhyme was released in the United States exclusively by Verizon Wireless on September 22, 2011, with releases in Asia and Europe beginning in October 2011. The Rhyme is a mid-range smartphone, distinguished by its use of an updated HTC Sense 3.5 user experience, and a selection of bundled accessories; such as a charging dock, wireless speakers, and an LED "charm" that can be used as a notification light. While it was not explicitly marketed as such by HTC (who referred to it as a "lifestyle" phone), the Rhyme was primarily developed and targeted towards women.

The Rhyme received favorable reviews for its performance, robust physical design, and a cleaner user interface in comparison to past HTC phones, along with its accessories. However, the Rhyme's overall specifications were panned by some for being too low-end in comparison to other recently released smartphones, or for being too similar to the HTC Desire S.

== Development and release ==
In May 2011, the technology blog This Is My Next learned that HTC was holding focus groups with women in their 20s and 30s regarding a new smartphone codenamed "Bliss", which would be released by Verizon Wireless by the end of the year, and be marketed towards a female demographic. Leaked details from the groups indicated that the phone would have a "calming" sea green color scheme with a design resembling a cross between the Desire S and Desire Z, and be pre-loaded with calorie counting and comparison shopping apps. Details also emerged about accessories that would be bundled with the Bliss, such as a speaker designed to be attached to a car's sun visor, a speaker dock for charging, and an LED "charm" attachment that could be used to provide notifications. Photos of the device's hardware and software leaked on a Chinese website in August 2011, revealing a new version of HTC Sense with updated widgets and a streamlined home screen layout.

On September 19, 2011, the final version of the device, now known as the HTC Rhyme, was leaked by a pre-order advertisement from TargetMobile. A Target PR representative stated that the Rhyme would become available in-store on September 29, 2011. HTC officially unveiled the Rhyme during a press event the following day, and also confirmed that it would be released exclusively by O2 in the United Kingdom on October 17, 2011. While unveiling the phone, HTC did not explicitly target the Rhyme towards women, but instead referred to it as a "lifestyle" device.

== Features ==
The Rhyme was constructed in a similar fashion to other recent HTC phones, with an aluminum unibody shell on its front, partially wrapping around its rear. The top portion of its rear above the aluminum "strip" is made of plastic to allow radio reception, while the lower removable bottom portion (which conceals its MicroSD and SIM card slots) uses a plastic intended to improve grip. The Rhyme was made available in three different colors; "Plum", "Hourglass", and "Clearwater". Only the Plum version was made available in the United States.

The Rhyme uses a single-core, 1 GHz Qualcomm Snapdragon with 3G connectivity, 768 MB of RAM, 4 GB of internal storage, a pre-loaded 8 GB microSD card, and a 3.7-inch WVGA LCD touchscreen display. The Rhyme uses a rear-facing 5-megapixel camera with LED flash and 720p video recording, and a front-facing VGA camera; the camera app includes burst mode, face recognition, and the ability to automatically upload photos to a Facebook album. The Rhyme uses a non-removable, 1600 mAh battery, rated as having 7.3 hours of talk time and 17 hours of standby time.

The Rhyme comes bundled with several accessories, such as an armband (designed to hold the phone while exercising), a Bluetooth headset and "tangle-free" earbuds in matching colors, a Bluetooth speaker designed to be clipped to a car's sun visor, and a charging dock with built-in speakers (which can be used to play music and use the phone as an alarm clock). The Rhyme also shipped with a "charm" accessory; a small, LED-lit cube that can be used to provide notifications for phone calls and text messages. The charm connects to the phone via a wire connected to its headphone jack; its design is intended to allow the charm to hang outside a bag or pocket for visibility. The charm itself also has a clip, which can be used to attach it to a purse's strap.

The device ships with Android 2.3.4 as its operating system, using the HTC Sense 3.5 user interface; the new version uses a simplified home screen layout that is exclusive to the Rhyme and the low-end Explorer, offering the ability to have up to five app shortcuts on the side of the home page, which can slide open to display additional content when available (such as upcoming calendar events or recent photos). The curved "dock" seen on other HTC phones is also replaced with two buttons in the bottom corners of the screen for the app drawer and phone. Alongside the stock HTC Sense apps, the Rhyme is also pre-loaded with Endomondo, Dropbox, and the HTC Watch movie service. On the U.S. version, the Rhyme also ships with several non-removable Verizon apps, such as V Cast and VZ Navigator. On August 31, 2012, HTC released a downloadable update to Android 4.0 with Sense 3.6 for the Rhyme through its HTCdev portal.

== Reception ==
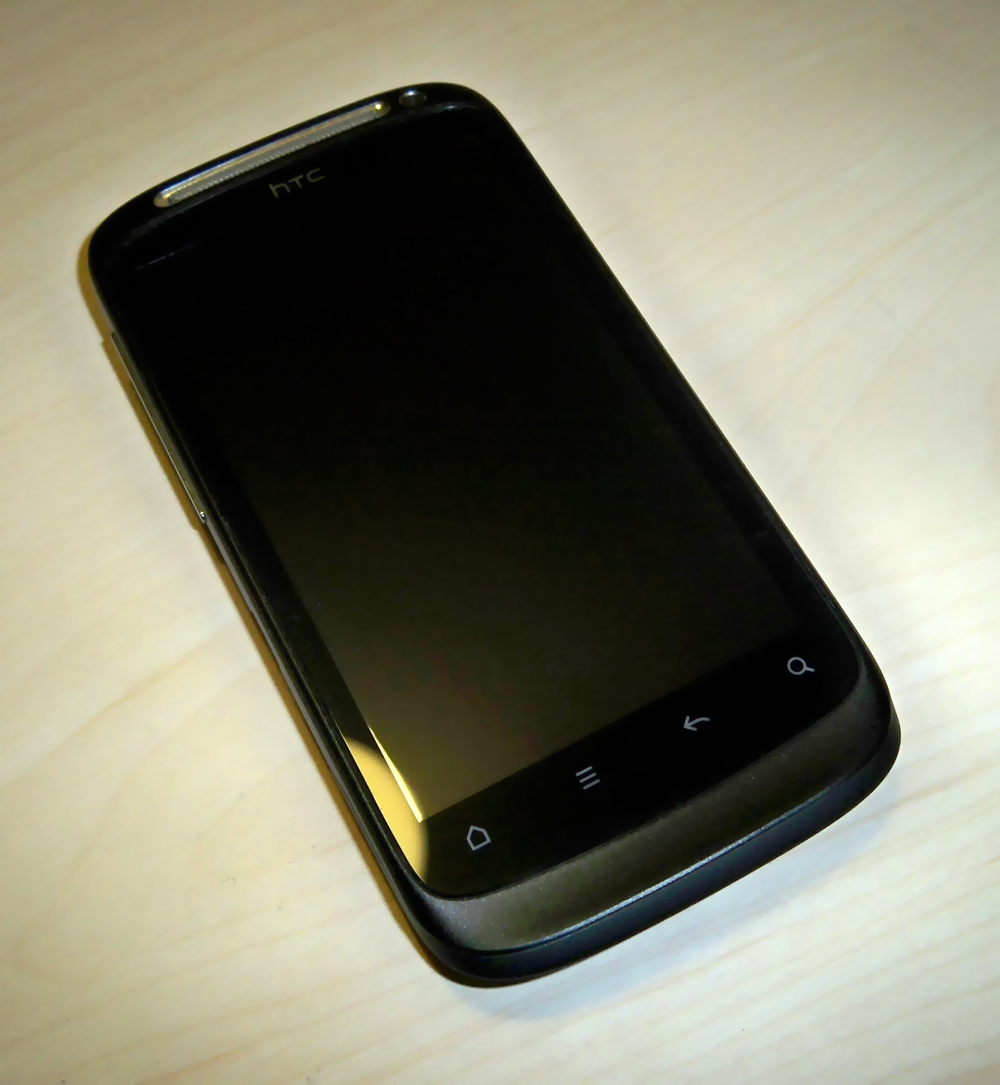
TechRadar panned the Rhyme for being too similar to the HTC Desire S (pictured)

The HTC Rhyme received mostly positive reviews. The performance of its 1 GHz single-core processor was considered responsive, but some reviewers encountered occasional lag when launching applications. The updated Sense 3.5 interface was praised for its cleaner home screen layout in comparison to other HTC phones, and its new ability to add and remove pages from the screen—but Engadget's Lydia Leavitt still criticized the Rhyme for containing too many miscellaneous HTC apps and widgets alongside Verizon's "crapware" applications. However, she complimented the carrier for its less intrusive presence on the Rhyme in comparison to past devices. The Rhyme's overall design was complimented by Engadget for being "almost as delicious as it sounds" and easy to grip. CNET considered the Rhyme's build to be compact and "luxurious", but felt that its other color options should have been made available in the U.S. as well to broaden its appeal beyond women. The Rhyme's 5-megapixel camera was shown to perform better in daylight environments and produce images and video of a decent quality.

The Rhyme's accessories were met with mixed reviews. CNET considered the included dock and accompanying functionality to be a "nice extra", but that the charm was an accessory that only some people would actually use. For pricing reasons, it was also suggested that a version of the Rhyme without the accessories included should have been offered as well. Engadget considered the charm to be a "glorified girly notification LED" that was difficult to see in sunlight and hard to attach to purses due to its "inflexible" clip. Its earbuds were also criticized for their poor fit, and their "scratchy and downright embarrassing" audio quality. However, TechRadar considered the charm to be useful, primarily because "it can often be a little difficult to wrench a phone out of a bag in time to catch the call."

CNET gave the HTC Rhyme an 8.0 out of 10 rating, considering it a niche phone for users who want a "stylish and functional" alternative to Verizon's higher-end devices. Engadget's Lydia Leavitt was critical of the phone's lack of a large screen, dual-core processor, or LTE support, but noted that its single-core processor still made the phone responsive, and that the lack of LTE did contribute to longer battery life than the HTC ThunderBolt. In conclusion, she suggested that people who do not like purple or HTC Sense buy a "male" phone instead. TechRadar's Laura Tosney gave the Rhyme a 4/5, considering it to be a further example of HTC's ability to make capable mid-range phones, but panned the device for essentially being a variation of the HTC Desire S with added accessories.

== See also ==
- List of HTC phones
