= Verizon Droid =

Type of mobile phone

Droid is a former series of phones exclusive to Verizon Wireless. The branding "Droid" is a registered trademark of Lucasfilm and is licensed to Verizon for use. Many of these phones are also sold in other countries under different names (for example, Motorola Droid is called Milestone in Europe); see under the individual articles for details.

Droid logo

== History ==
It was announced on July 23, 2013, that Motorola will now exclusively manufacture Droid phones for Verizon.

== Phones ==
- HTC Droid Eris – Released on November 6, 2009
- Motorola Droid – Released November 6, 2009
- HTC Droid Incredible – Released on April 29, 2010
- Motorola Droid X – Released July 15, 2010
- Motorola Droid 2 – Released August 12, 2010
- Motorola Droid Pro – Optimized for business users, released November 18, 2010
- HTC Droid Incredible 2 – Released April, 2011
- Samsung Droid Charge – Released May 14, 2011
- Motorola Droid X2 – Released May 19, 2011
- Motorola Droid 3 – Released July 7, 2011, shipping with 2.3.6 Gingerbread
- Motorola Droid Bionic – Released September 8, 2011
- Motorola Droid Razr – Released November 11, 2011
- Motorola Droid Razr Maxx – Shipping January 26, 2012
- Motorola Droid 4 – Released February 10, 2012
- HTC Droid Incredible 4G LTE – Released July 5, 2012
- Motorola Droid Razr M – Released September 2012
- Motorola Droid Razr HD – Released October 18, 2012
- Motorola Droid Razr HD Maxx – Released October 18, 2012
- HTC Droid DNA – Released November 21, 2012
- Motorola Droid Maxx – Released July 23, 2013
- Motorola Droid Ultra – Released July 23, 2013
- Motorola Droid Mini – Released July 23, 2013
- Motorola Droid Turbo – Released October 28, 2014
- Motorola Droid Maxx 2 – Released October 27, 2015
- Motorola Droid Turbo 2 – Released October 27, 2015
- Moto Z Droid – Released July 2016
- Moto Z Force Droid – Released July 2016
- Moto Z Play Droid – Released September 8, 2016
