= Motorola Devour =

2010 Android smartphone by Motorola

- Manufacturer: Motorola
- Type: Slider smartphone
- First released: March 25, 2010
- Dimensions: 115.5 mm (4.55 in) (h); 61 mm (2.4 in) (w); 15.4 mm (0.61 in) (d)
- Weight: 180 g (6.3 oz)
- Operating system: Android 1.6
- CPU: 600 MHz Qualcomm MSM7627
- Memory: 512 MB ROM; 256 MB RAM
- Storage: Removable: 8 GB; expandable up to 32 GB
- Battery: 1400 mAh; Internal rechargeable removable lithium-ion polymer battery
- Rear camera: 3.0 megapixel with fixed focus
- Display: 480 x 320 px, 3.1 in (79 mm), 3:2 aspect ratio, HVGA
- Connectivity: USB Micro-B; Wi-Fi (802.11b/g), Bluetooth 2.1+EDR, US Version: Dual band CDMA2000/EV-DO Rev. A 800 1900
- Data inputs: capacitive touchscreen display, QWERTY keyboard

The Motorola Devour is an Internet and multimedia enabled smartphone designed by Motorola, which runs Google's Android operating system. In the United States, the handset is distributed exclusively by Verizon Wireless. The Devour has a Hearing Aid Compatibility (HAC) rating of M4/T4. Although it runs Android, the Devour was not branded or marketed as part of Verizon's "DROID" series of Android smartphones.

== Motoblur ==
The Devour was the second smartphone from Motorola to feature Motoblur. Motoblur provides contact sync from email services like gmail and social networking sites like Twitter, Facebook etc. MOTOBLUR is a re-branded interface developed by Motorola for the Android OS. It replaces both the Google Experience skin and application stack.

== See also ==
- List of Android devices
- Droid (disambiguation)
- Galaxy Nexus
