= Droid 2 =

Android smartphone developed by Motorola Mobility

Motorola Droid 2 (A955) Motorola Milestone 2 (A953) Motorola Droid 2 Global (A956)Motorola Droid R2D2 (A955)
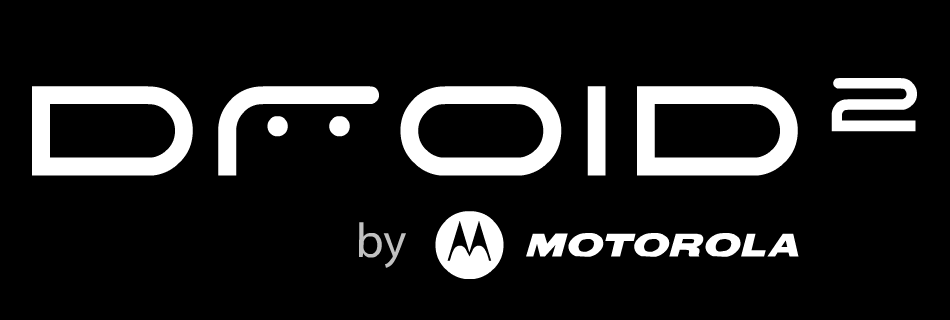

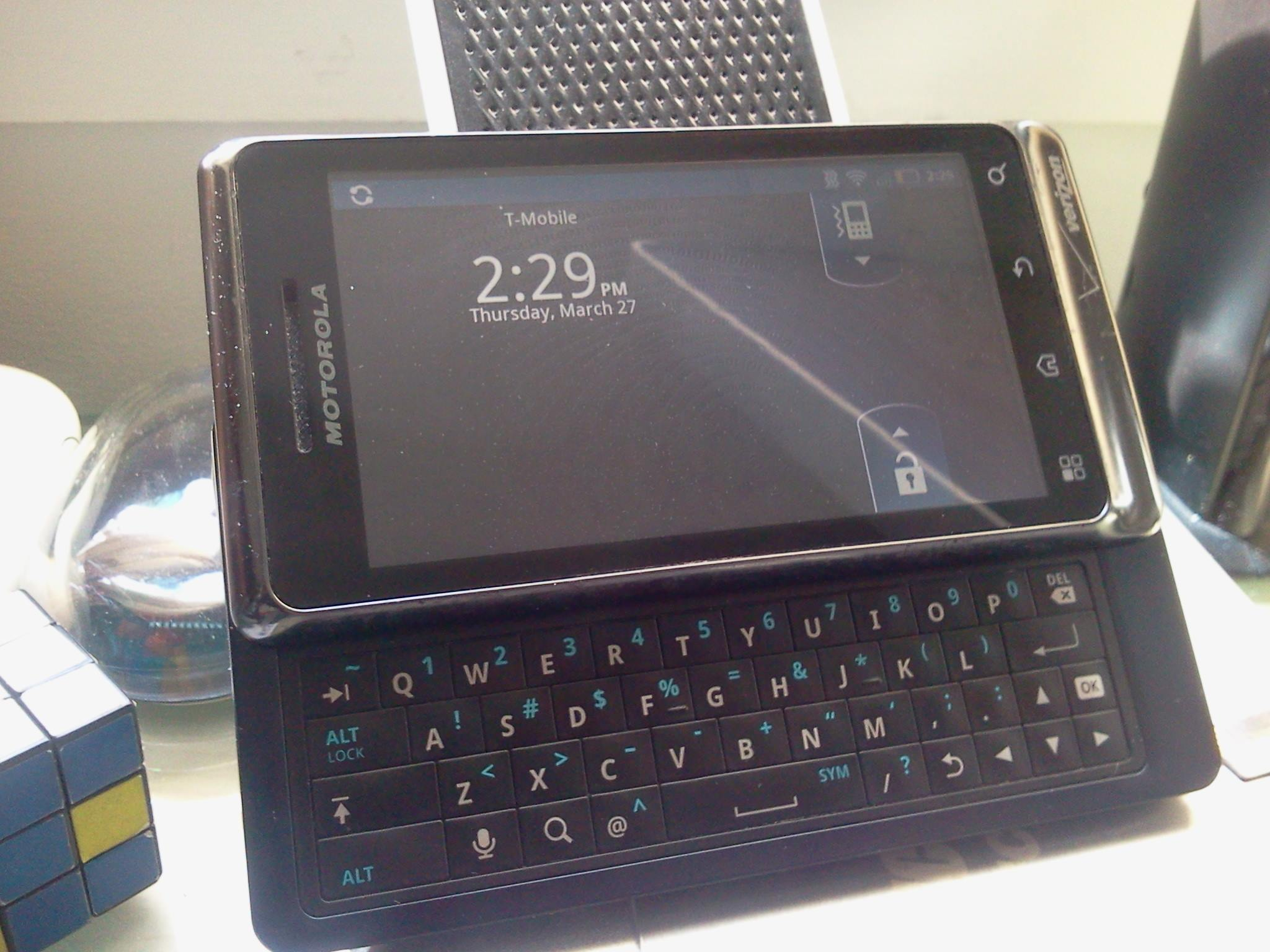
- Motorola Droid 2 (A955)
- Manufacturer: Motorola
- Series: Droid
- Availability by region: August 12, 2010
- Discontinued: Q3 2011
- Predecessor: Motorola Droid
- Successor: Droid 3 Droid 4
- Related: Motorola Droid, Motorola Droid Pro, Motorola Droid X, Motorola Droid X2, Motorola Droid Bionic, Motorola Milestone, Motorola Milestone 2, Motorola Droid 3, Motorola Milestone 3
- Compatible networks: Droid 2: CDMA2000/EV-DO Rev. A 800/1900 MHz; Milestone 2: quad band GSM, UMTS 900/2100 MHz; Droid 2 Global: quad band GSM, UMTS 850/1900/2100 MHz, CDMA 800/1900 MHz
- Form factor: Slate slider smartphone
- Dimensions: 116.3 mm (4.58 in) H 60.5 mm (2.38 in) W 13.7 mm (0.54 in) D
- Weight: 169 g (6.0 oz)
- Operating system: Android 2.2; 2.3.4 Gingerbread with over-air update August 2011; 4.0.4 Ice Cream Sandwich with custom ROMs
- CPU: 1 GHz OMAP 3630 Droid 2 Global runs an OMAP3640 clocked at 1.2 GHz
- Memory: 8 GB flash ROM, 512 MB RAM
- Storage: 8 GB onboard phone, SD card up to 32 GB (included 8 GB MicroSD Card)
- Removable storage: 8 GB microSD, maximum 32 GB
- Battery: 1400 mAh internal rechargeable removable lithium-ion polymer battery Talk time: 9.58 hours Standby time: up to 315 hours
- Rear camera: 5.0 MP, autofocus, dual LED flash, digital zoom, geotagging
- Display: 480×854 px (0.41 MP) TFT LCD, 3.7 in (94 mm), 16:9 aspect ratio, WVGA
- Connectivity: Bluetooth 2.1, HTML web browser, synchronization, Wi-Fi, WLAN, 3G Mobile Hotspot
- Data inputs: Slide out full QWERTY keyboard
- Hearing aid compatibility: Yes
- Other: Virtual QWERTY keyboard, Swype, physical keyboard (QWERTY keyboard)

The Motorola Droid 2 (GSM/UMTS version: Motorola Milestone 2; GSM/UMTS/CDMA version: Motorola Droid 2 Global) is the fifth smartphone in Verizon's Droid line. In the U.S., it is available exclusively on Verizon Wireless, and was released August 12, 2010 (pre-order sales of the device began August 11). It runs the Android operating system by Google, and can run Flash Player 10.1. It comes with 8 GB of internal memory and is shipped with an additional 8 GB SDHC card, upgradable to 32 GB. It has a 3.7 in display and a 5-megapixel camera. Unlike the Droid X, the Motorola Droid 2 features a redesigned slide-out QWERTY keyboard, but still features the Swype keyboard found on the Droid X. A limited-edition version featuring the Star Wars droid character R2-D2 with exclusive apps and content was announced by Verizon for September 30, 2010, to commemorate the thirtieth anniversary for The Empire Strikes Back.

== Pricing ==
In the US it was sold by Verizon for $149.99 on contract or $559.99 with no contract. Secondary seller pricing as of December 2010 is $0.00 with contract

== Reception ==
Reviewers felt that the good aspects of the prior Droid, like the sturdy build and functional styling, were maintained in the Droid 2, but with many refinements. Some reviewers thought that the styling was less abrupt, but some criticised the device for not departing enough from the prior design. The consensus on the screen was that, while it was not as big as some phones, or as high resolution as the iPhone 4, it was good quality and not too small. The new keyboard was praised by some reviewers for being less awkward than on the prior Droid, but others found little improvement. The keyboard overall had mixed reviews but was generally the same but without a D-pad. The camera, like other parts of the device, was criticised by some for being little better than the prior device, but most were happy with picture quality. Most reviewers found the device to be good and solid all around, but saw it as a small evolution of an already successful model rather than a revolutionary new device.

== Patent suit ==
In October 2010, Microsoft filed a lawsuit against Motorola with the International Trade Commission in a district court in Washington, D.C., claiming the manufacturer had "infringed on nine patents in its Android-based devices." The court papers specifically mention the Droid 2 and Motorola Charm smartphones but Microsoft claimed that it was not limited to these phones.

== Revised model (new keyboard) ==
The original Droid phone received criticism for its keys being too flat and for not having an offset placement. The Droid 2 was designed with a replacement closer to that of standard keyboard as seen with computer's keyboard with significantly raised ("domed") keys.

A revision of the Droid 2 features keys that are much closer to the flatness of the Droid 1, but it does maintain the offset placement. Both phones are labeled as Model: A955, HW B on the inside of the battery compartment. Other changes may have been made as well.

== See also ==
- HTC Droid Incredible released on April 29, 2010.
- Motorola Droid released November 6, 2009.
- Motorola Droid Pro optimized for business users, released November 18, 2010.
- Motorola Droid X Android 2.3 version hardware released in Mexico.
- Motorola Droid X2 released May 19, 2011.
- Motorola Droid 3 released July 7, 2011, shipping with Android 2.3.4 (Gingerbread).
- Galaxy Nexus
- List of Android devices
