= Droid Incredible =

Android-based smartphone manufactured by HTC

HTC Droid Incredible
- Manufacturer: HTC
- Type: smartphone
- Series: Droid
- First released: April 29, 2010; 16 years ago
- Discontinued: March 30, 2011
- Predecessor: HTC Droid Eris
- Successor: HTC Incredible S
- Related: HTC Evo 4G; HTC ThunderBolt
- Compatible networks: CDMA2000/EV-DO Rev. A
- Form factor: Slate
- Dimensions: 117.5 mm (4.63 in) H 58.5 mm (2.30 in) W 11.9 mm (0.47 in) D
- Weight: 130 g (4.6 oz)
- Operating system: Android 2.1 (Eclair) upgradeable to Android 2.3.4 (Gingerbread) as of September 15, 2011
- CPU: 1 GHz Qualcomm Snapdragon (QSD8650)
- GPU: Adreno 200
- Memory: 512 MB DDR RAM
- Storage: 1 GB ROM (748 MB free to user) plus 8 GB moviNAND
- Removable storage: microSD 2.0 memory card (supports up to 32 GB)
- Battery: 1300 mAh lithium-ion Talk time: Up to 313 minutes Standby time: Up to 146 hours
- Rear camera: 8.0 megapixel back-facing camera with auto focus and dual LED flashes with 720p HD video recording (no front-facing camera)
- Display: 3.7-inch 480 × 800 px WVGA AMOLED or super TFT LCD (S-LCD) at 252 ppi
- Connectivity: Wi-Fi (802.11b/g); Bluetooth 2.1 with A2DP stereo and EDR; A-GPS; FM tuner, 3.5 mm TRSS connector, micro-USB, mobile MiFi Verizon Wireless hotspot
- Data inputs: Multi-touch capacitive touchscreen display, optical joystick, Push-buttons, ambient light sensors, 3-axis accelerometer, digital compass, Proximity sensor
- Hearing aid compatibility: M4/T3
- Other: HTC Sense (with Friend Stream)

The HTC Droid Incredible (ADR6300) (also known as the HTC Incredible) is a smartphone manufactured by HTC Corporation using the Android operating system. It was released on April 29, 2010, and is available through Verizon Wireless only. The device is similar to Sprint's HTC Evo 4G. The device has been succeeded by the HTC Incredible S and the HTC ThunderBolt. The device was discontinued on March 30, 2011.

== Features ==
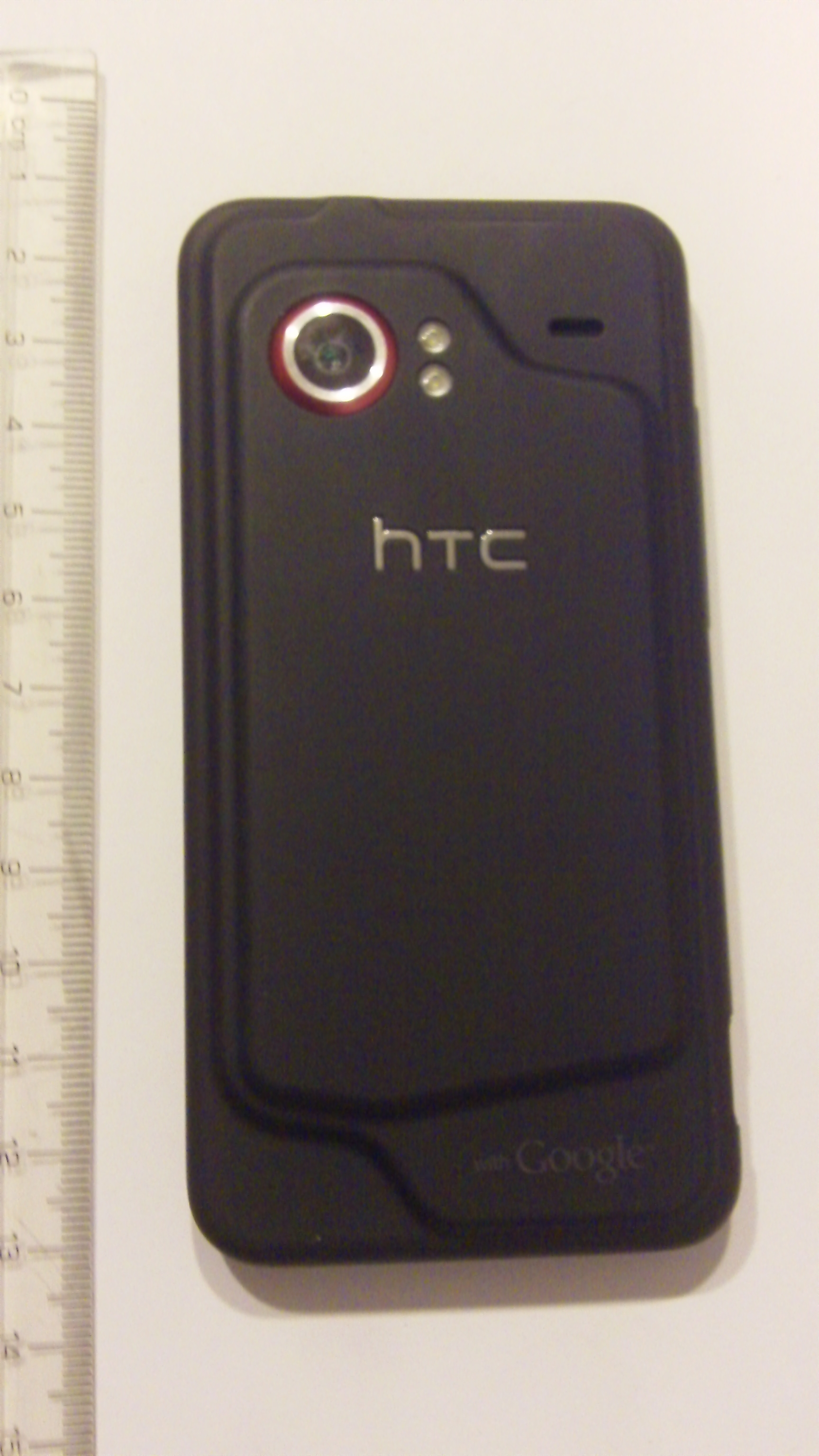
Droid Incredible (back)

The device was released running Android 2.1 (Eclair) software, modified with HTC Sense, an overlay user interface for the Android operating system. Following the announcement of Android 2.2 (Froyo), HTC did not comment on whether the device would receive 2.2 or when, although it did state all equipped devices would be updated by Christmas 2010, and an update to the following version of Android, codenamed Gingerbread, would depend on its release by Google. The updates would come in the form of an over-the-air (OTA) update.

It has improvements over standard 2.1 devices including an FM tuner; a Facebook-, Twitter-, and Flickr-integrated social-aggregation application called Friend Stream (as well as a Twitter client named Peep); a geotagging application for photos called Footprints; and a redesigned appearance and functionality for stock 2.1 applications. The device features an 8-megapixel camera with dual LED flash, optical mouse and a camcorder with resolution of up to 1280x720 (WXGA), which may be compressed in either MP4 or H.263 format.

It optionally supports tethering by Verizon Wireless with VZAccess Manager. Other ways of tethering may be possible. The device shares the AV output with micro USB output, providing the facility to see the video/YouTube/browser on a television or projector via an extra (not bundled) composite cable accessory.

== Display change ==
During summer 2010, HTC switched the AMOLED displays made by Samsung to Sony Super TFT LCD. The change was done to keep up with the high demand for the device. HTC claims that there are "no discernible difference between the displays" and they even expect the change to go unnoticed.

== Update to Android 2.2 (Froyo) ==
On July 19, 2010, it was leaked from HTC that the device would receive Android 2.2 (Froyo) via an OTA update in late July or early August 2010.

Before Verizon Wireless had officially announced the update, its technicians, speaking "officially unofficially" on Twitter, confirmed it. On August 13, 2010, Mashable reported that the device would begin to receive Android 2.2 (Froyo) on August 18, 2010. However, statements from official Verizon Wireless sources indicated that this was a hoax. Verizon Wireless confirmed on August 27, 2010, that the device would begin receiving Android 2.2 through an OTA update beginning on that date.

Starting August 26, 2010, all new devices were shipped with Android 2.2 (Froyo). The software update from Android 2.1 v1 (Éclair) to 2.2 also included an updated version of HTC's "Sense" User Interface, which included minor updates to the media player, and a flashlight app which enables the camera's LED flash to operate as a flashlight. Other benefits of the update included: Adobe Flash Player 10, 720p video recording, 3G mobile hotspot (US$30/mo for 2GB), and the ability to rotate the screen 270 degrees. The update also installed several applications which cannot be removed, and which run without being invoked by the phone's user: an Amazon MP3 applet, CityID, Skype Mobile, My Verizon Mobile, a stock-tracking applet and VZ Navigator.

== Update to Android 2.3 (Gingerbread) ==
On August 20, 2011, AndroidPolice.com obtained the official update build as an RUU, which users wanting the latest software were able to download to their computer, put on the SD card as a required name, after which the bootloader would pick it up.

Verizon Wireless did not deploy the update as an OTA update after it was pulled back the week of August 16.

On September 7, 2011, Verizon Wireless began deploying the Gingerbread (Android 2.3.4) OTA update to customers. This update also fixed several outstanding issues that had been reported by customers regarding MMS messaging, Bluetooth connectivity, and the City ID app.

However, this update proved almost immediately to be problematic. Once the update was sent to some HTC phones, many Verizon Wireless customers experienced problems with receiving text messages on the device. HTC representatives said they were fixing the system update to correct the text-messaging issue. Many of the HTC updates caused errors within the Incredible, changing the layout and sometimes even the device set up. Many device owners were critical of Verizon Wireless and HTC for slowing down the roll-out process. Although the upgrade was released OTA on September 7 and HTC and Verizon Wireless promised phone owners would receive the update "in September", many device owners were still waiting for the update nearly four weeks later – and after September had come and gone.

On November 15, 2011, the revised update to the Android 2.3.x (Gingerbread) was available via an OTA update to customers. It was automatically sent to device users, and attempted to fix bugs which were known with the September release, including MMS problems. This patch, however, proved to be problematic for some users to install because their device claims to not have enough space or will not restart to complete the update, but community support found solutions to these problems.

== Support ==
The device supports full Adobe Flash Player 10.3.

It supports the following audio formats: AAC, AMR, OGG, M4A, MID, MP3, WAV and WMA. Supported video formats include: 3GP, 3G2, MP4 and WMV.

== Platform development, hacking, and modifications ==
There are several hidden menus and commands available from the phone's keypad. The ones shown below work as of OS version 2.3.4. Note: "+call" means to press the "Call" button.

- ##33284+call (spells DEBUG) Loads "Field Trial" menu
- ##7764726+call (spells PROGRAM) At password prompt, enter six zeros (000000). Loads "EPST" menu.
- ##778+call (spells PST) Loads different EPST menu
- ##775+call Loads different PRL menu
- *#*#2432546#*#* (spells CHECKIN) Checks for updates. If check-in fails, an alert will appear in the notification bar.
- *#*#4636#*#* (spells INFO) Loads "Testing" menu. Items: Phone Information; Battery information; Usage statistics; and Wifi information
- *#*#7262626#*#* (Field test menu)
- *#*#8255#*#* (spells TALK) Loads Gtalk Service Monitor
- *#*#8350#*#* (spells TEL0) Disables voice dialer logging. Feedback message "Voice Dialer logging is disabled." should appear.
- *#*#8351#*#* (spells TEL1) Enables voice dialer logging. Feedback message "Voice Dialer logging is enabled." should appear.
- *#*#3424#*#* (service code) test menu

Root has been achieved, initially by causing a race condition in Google's Android Debug Bridge (adb), and later with a "painless root" made by unrEVOked!

Since root has been achieved, several enhancements such as Wi-Fi tethering are now available. The phone has had functional ROMs of every version of CyanogenMod up to and including CM 11.

== Critical reception ==
In April 2010, Engadget stated: "the DROID Incredible is the best Android device that you can purchase in America right now."

PC Magazine wrote "The DROID Incredible by HTC is an absolutely amazing device. The most powerful phone on the U.S. market today, it reflects and enhances the state of the art smartphone, with the full backing and support of the Verizon Wireless network."

== See also ==
- Motorola Droid
- Droid Pro
- Droid X
- Droid Incredible 2, released in February 2011
- Droid 2, released August 12, 2010
- Droid X2, released May 19, 2011
- Droid 3, released July 7, 2011
