= Droid Incredible 4G LTE =

Smartphone developed by HTC

- Manufacturer: HTC Corporation
- Series: Droid
- First released: July 5, 2012
- Predecessor: HTC Incredible S
- Successor: Droid DNA
- Compatible networks: CDMA, 4G LTE
- Operating system: Android 4.0.4 Ice Cream Sandwich, HTC Sense 4.1
- CPU: Dual-Core, 1.2 GHz Snapdragon S4 "Krait" (Qualcomm)
- GPU: Qualcomm Adreno 225
- Memory: 1 GB RAM
- Storage: 8 GB eMMC
- Removable storage: Micro-SDHC (32 GB max)
- Battery: 1700 mAh Li-ion (removable by user)
- Rear camera: Backside illumination 8-megapixel autofocus with LED flash, f/2.2, 28 mm lens
- Front camera: 1.3-megapixel
- Display: 960x540 px, 4-inch at 275 ppi capacitive S-LCD
- Connectivity: LTE, CDMA2000, UMTS/HSPA 2100/900, Quad Band GSM/GPRS/EDGE (850/900/1800/1900), Bluetooth 4.0, Wi-Fi supporting 802.11 a/b/g/n, Wi-Fi Direct. Wi-Fi hotspot, micro-USB, NFC
- Data inputs: Multi-touch touchscreen display 3-axis accelerometer Digital compass Proximity sensor Ambient light sensor

The Droid Incredible 4G LTE, also known as the HTC Incredible 4G or Incredible 3, is a smartphone designed and manufactured by Taiwan's HTC Corporation that runs the Android 4.0 operating system (ICS). Officially announced by Verizon on May 7, 2012, for CTIA, and released on July 5, 2012, through Verizon Wireless for $149.99 with a new two-year contract. The Droid Incredible 4G LTE is the successor to the HTC Incredible S.

== Hardware ==
The Droid Incredible 4G LTE has a 4-inch qHD (540x960) Super LCD, a dual core 1.2 GHz Qualcomm Snapdragon S4 processor with 1 GB of RAM, an 8 MP auto-focus camera with LED flash, a 0.3 MP front-facing camera, and a 1700 mAh battery.

== Software ==
The Droid Incredible 4G LTE, at launch, ran Android 4.0.4 (Ice Cream Sandwich), with HTC's Sense 4.1 user interface. However, since launch, the latest available software for this phone is Android 4.4.4 (Kit Kat).

== See also ==
- HTC Rezound
- HTC One series
- Galaxy Nexus
