= Droid Pro =

Android smartphone developed by Motorola Mobility

Motorola Droid Pro, Motorola XPRT, Motorola PRO
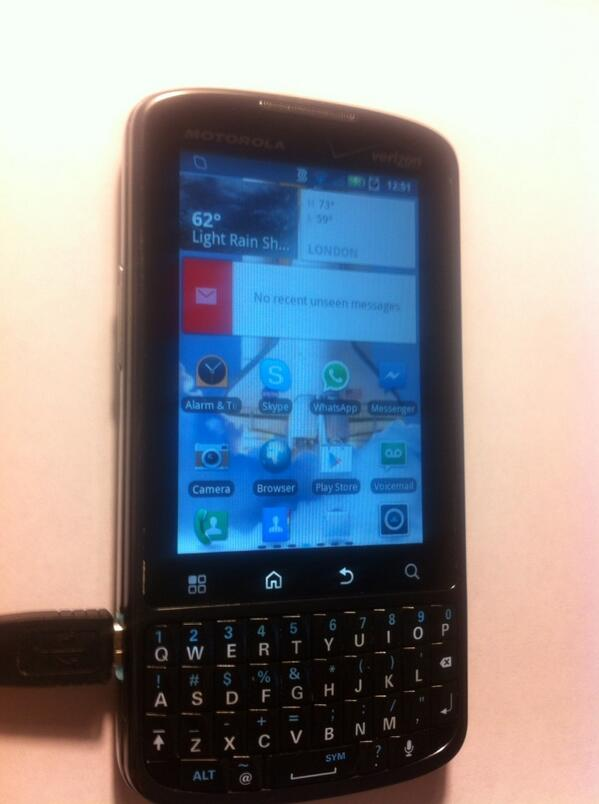
- Manufacturer: Motorola
- Series: Droid
- Availability by region: November 18, 2010
- Related: Motorola Droid, Motorola Droid 2, Motorola Droid X, Motorola Titanium.
- Compatible networks: Verizon Wireless, Sprint, Boost Mobile
- Dimensions: 4.68 in (119 mm) H 2.51 in (64 mm) W 0.46 in (12 mm) D
- Weight: 4.72 oz (134 g)
- Operating system: Android 2.2, was later updated to Android 2.3 (Android Ice Cream Sandwich) 4.0.4 (Developing) CyanogenMod 9
- CPU: TI OMAP3620-1000: ARMv7, 1GHz
- GPU: PowerVR SGX530
- Memory: 512 MB RAM, 2 GB flash
- Storage: Internal: 2 GB flash; external: microSD slot up to 32 GB
- Battery: 1420 mAh (DROID PRO), 1860 mAh (XPRT) internal rechargeable removable lithium-ion battery
- Rear camera: 5-megapixel autofocus with 4x digital zoom, dual LED flash, 480p video recorder
- Display: 3.1" 320x480 HVGA TFT LCD
- Connectivity: CDMA EVDO Rev. A 800/1900 with dual diversity antenna, GSM 850/900/1800/1900MHz, GPRS Class 12, EDGE Class 12, WCDMA category 9/10 850/1900/2100, HSDPA 10.2 mbps, HSUPA 5.76 mbps, stereo Bluetooth v2.1 + EDR (A2DP, AVRCP, HFP, HID, HSP, OPP, PBAP), 802.11b/g/n, USB 2.0 (HS), DLNA
- Data inputs: Touchscreen display, keyboard
- Hearing aid compatibility: M3
- Other: Sensors: Proximity, ambient light, eCompass

The Motorola Droid Pro, also offered by Sprint and Boost Mobile as the Motorola XPRT, and outside the United States simply as the Motorola PRO, is an Android-based smartphone manufactured by Motorola and released on November 18, 2010, for Verizon Wireless and June 5, 2011, for Sprint. These devices are available for Verizon, Sprint and Boost Mobile in the United States, and are designed for business users.

== Features ==
The Droid Pro/XPRT/PRO features a 3.1" capacitive touchscreen paired with a QWERTY keyboard, and a 5-megapixel autofocus camera with dual LED flash. The smartphone includes global abilities, with customers able to use services in over 220 countries worldwide, 120 of which offer 3G connectivity. The Pro also includes 3G mobile hotspot abilities, and thus can share its connection, with up to five other devices.

== See also ==
- HTC Droid Incredible released on April 29, 2010.
- Motorola Droid released November 6, 2009.
- Motorola Droid X Android 2.3 version hardware released in Mexico.
- Motorola Droid 2 released August 12, 2010.
- Motorola Droid X2 released May 19, 2011.
- Motorola Droid 3 released July 7, shipping with Android 2.3.4 (Gingerbread).
- Motorola Pro+ (MB632) slightly improved version of the DROID PRO with higher resolution screen, Qualcomm MSM8255 CPU, and Android 2.3.
- List of Android smartphones
