= Droid X =

Android smartphone developed by Motorola Mobility

Motorola Droid X Motorola Motoroi X

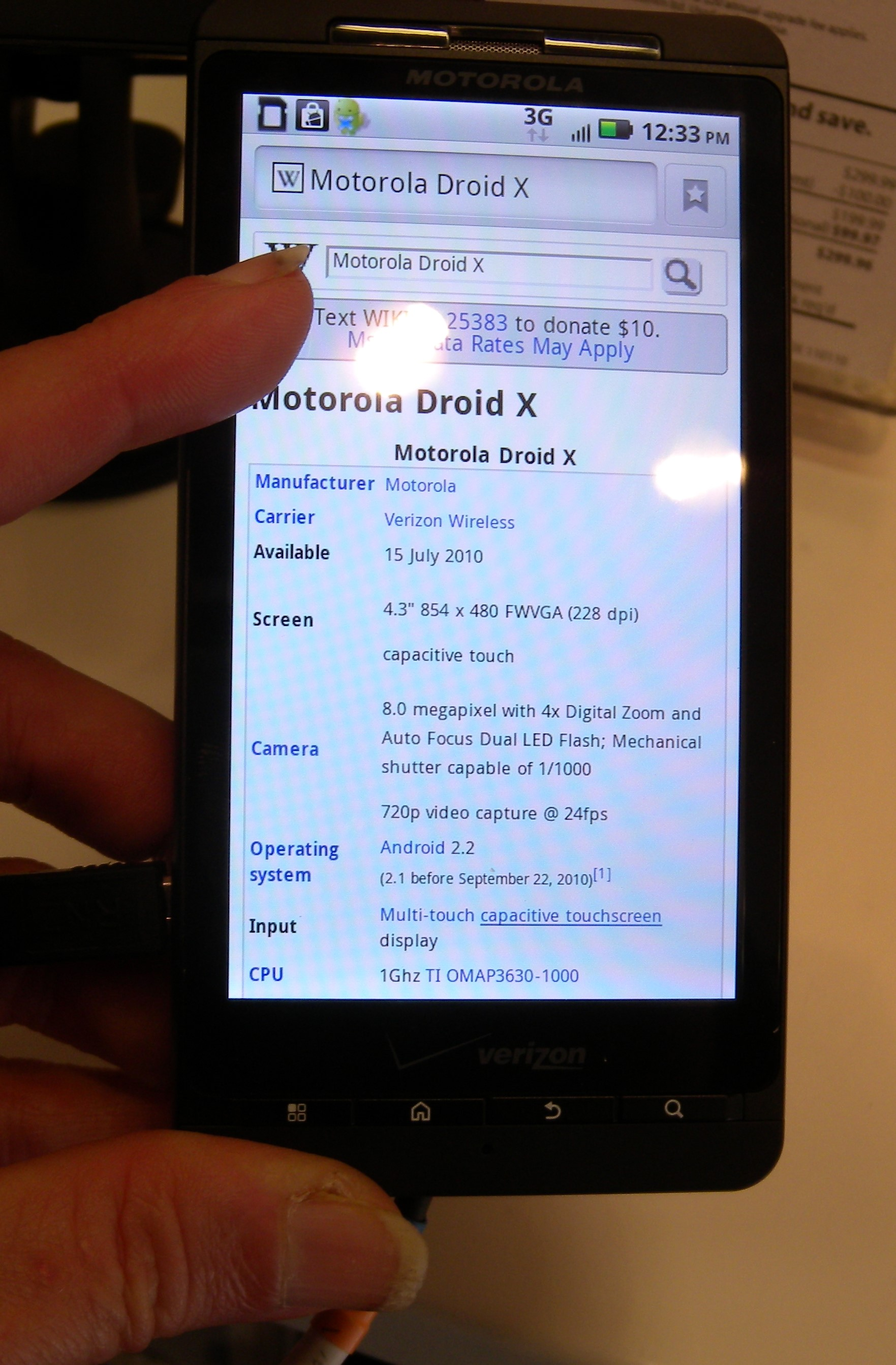
- Motorola Droid X (United States - Verizon Wireless)
- Manufacturer: Motorola (Until 2011) Motorola Mobility, Inc.
- Type: Smartphone
- Series: Droid
- First released: United States July 15, 2010; 15 years ago (Verizon Wireless)
- Availability by region: Mexico November 16, 2010 (Iusacell)
- Predecessor: Motorola Droid
- Successor: Motorola Droid X2
- Compatible networks: CDMA 1X 850/1900, EVDO Rev. A
- Form factor: Slate
- Dimensions: 127.5 mm (5.02 in) H 65.5 mm (2.58 in) W 9.9 mm (0.39 in) D
- Weight: 155 g (5.5 oz)
- Operating system: Android 2.1 (Eclair); upgradeable to Android 2.3 (Gingerbread)
- CPU: 1 GHz TI OMAP3630-1000
- GPU: PowerVR SGX530
- Memory: 512 MB Mobile DDR SDRAM
- Storage: 8 GB flash memory
- Removable storage: 2 GB microSDHC class 6, supports up to 32 GB
- Battery: Internal Rechargeable Li-ion; User replaceable 1540mAh Part #: BH5X; 1880mAh Part #: BH6X (option)
- Rear camera: 8.0-megapixel with 4X digital zoom Autofocus; Dual LED flash 1/1000 mechanical shutter 720×1280 (720P) video capture at 20 fps
- Display: TFT LCD, 4.3 in (110 mm) diagonal 854×480 px FWVGA at 228 ppi
- Connectivity: 3.5 mm TRRS; Bluetooth v2.1 + EDR with A2DP & AVRCP; DLNA micro-HDMI (type D) micro-USB 2.0; Wi-Fi 802.11b/g/n
- Data inputs: Multi-touch capacitive touchscreen Push buttons A-GPS; S-GPS; Microphones (3); Accelerometer; Proximity sensor Ambient light sensor Magnetometer
- SAR: Head 1.43 W/kg; Body 1.41 W/kg
- Hearing aid compatibility: M4, T3

Motorola Droid X2
- Manufacturer: Motorola Mobility, Inc.
- Type: Smartphone
- Series: Droid
- First released: United States June 19, 2011; 15 years ago (Verizon Wireless)
- Predecessor: Motorola Droid X
- Related: Motorola Atrix 4G
- Compatible networks: CDMA 1X 850/1900, EVDO Rev. A
- Form factor: Slate
- Dimensions: 127.5 mm (5.02 in) H 65.5 mm (2.58 in) W 9.9 mm (0.39 in) D
- Weight: 155 g (5.5 oz)
- Operating system: Android 2.2.2 (Froyo); 2.3.3 (Gingerbread) starting 28 July 2011; 2.3.4 starting 25 February 2012; 2.3.5 starting May 2012
- CPU: 1 GHz Nvidia Tegra 2 (Cortex-A9)
- GPU: 300 MHz ULP GeForce
- Memory: 512 MB Mobile DDR SDRAM
- Storage: 8 GB flash memory
- Removable storage: 8 GB microSDHC class 6, supports up to 32 GB
- Battery: 1540 mAh Internal Rechargeable Li-ion; User replaceable
- Rear camera: 8.0-megapixel with 4X digital zoom Autofocus; Dual LED flash 1/1000 mechanical shutter 720×1280 (720P) video capture at 30 fps
- Display: TFT LCD, 4.3 in (110 mm) diagonal 960×540 px qHD at 256 ppi
- Connectivity: 3.5 mm TRRS; Bluetooth v2.1 + EDR with A2DP & AVRCP; DLNA micro-HDMI (type D) micro-USB 2.0; Wi-Fi 802.11b/g/n
- Data inputs: Multi-touch capacitive touchscreen Push buttons A-GPS; S-GPS; Microphone; Accelerometer; Proximity sensor
- SAR: Head 0.74 W/kg; Body 1.5 W/kg
- Hearing aid compatibility: M4, T3

The Droid X is a smartphone released by Motorola in July 2010. The smartphone was renamed Motoroi X for its release in Mexico on November 9, 2013. The Droid X runs on the Android operating system, and the latest version supported was 2.3 Gingerbread. It was distributed by Verizon Wireless in the United States and Iusacell in Mexico.

Motorola ceased production of the Droid X on March 31, 2011. Less than two months later on May 26, 2011, Motorola released its successor, the Droid X2, which featured an upgraded dual-core processor called the Nvidia Tegra 2. These were the only products.

== History ==
Motorola released the Droid X on July 15, 2010, at an initial price of US$569, or $199 with a two-year contract commitment. The smartphone was only available to Verizon Wireless customers in the United States and to Iusacell customers in Mexico, where it was released as Motoroi X on November 9, 2010.

A leaked end-of-life document from Verizon showed that production of the Droid X would end on March 31, 2011. It was succeeded by the Droid X2 on May 26, 2011.

== Specifications ==
=== Hardware ===
The Droid X features a 1.0 GHz TI OMAP3630-1000 SoC, a 4.3 in (110 mm) FWVGA (854 × 480) TFT LCD, 8 GB of internal flash memory and a 16 GB microSDHC card, and is compatible with microSDHC cards up to 32 GB. When the Droid X was first released it came standard with a microSDHC card of 16 GB, but Motorola reduced the size to 2 GB. Users input data to the phone via a multi-touch capacitive touchscreen. The Droid X includes an 8-megapixel camera with autofocus and LED flash and can record video at 720p resolution up to 24 fps also.

== Reception ==
The Droid X received favorable reviews. CNET gave the phone an 8.3/10 and praised the 8-megapixel camera as well as the HDMI output capability. PC Magazine gave the phone 8.7/10 and said that the Droid X was a true iPhone 4 competitor. The phone became the second-highest-selling phone of August 2010, right behind the iPhone 4.

The smartphone received significant attention from the ROM development community, for example from CyanogenMod. As of November 2015, periodic conversation still appears on development forums. The smartphone has received updates to Ice Cream Sandwich and KitKat as of May 2019.

== Droid X2 ==
The second generation Droid X2 is physically similar in every respect, even sharing the same battery, except that it lacks a physical camera button. Motorola's decision to drop the camera button has been met with both praise and ridicule. Some say it lends the phone a sleeker look, while others report that the lack of a physical button makes taking steady pictures more difficult. Internally, it is built around the Nvidia Tegra 2 chip with two ARM Cortex-A9 cores running at 1 GHz; this SoC provides greatly enhanced graphics power. The other significant change for the X2 is the switch to a RGBW PenTile display with qHD resolution. The X2 comes standard from Verizon with an 8 GB SD card and 8 GB of internal memory. Although the major specifications of the 8-megapixel camera and 720p HD video recorder are unchanged, image quality has been improved and video is now recorded at 30 fps thanks to a revised camera sensor.

While the Droid X had already been upgraded to Android 2.3 at the X2's launch, the X2 was released with 2.2 and a promise for an update to 2.3. 2.3.3 was released in batches starting on July 28, 2011, and available to pull over-the-air on August 1, 2011. Android 2.3.4 was soak tested to most users on October 12 to fix various bugs. Android 2.3.5 soak was started early May to some users (verizon 1.3.418.) As of May 2012, the US Verizon version has been updated to 2.3.5. The non-Verizon and International version, the Milestone X2 has been updated by Motorola Mobility to 2.3.6. Verizon promises a 2.3.6 update but Motorola Mobility has confirmed it will never see Android 4.0 Ice Cream Sandwich.

The Droid X2 was a disappointment to fans of Official Motorola Droid devices and was met with equally lackluster sales. For Droid X owners, the lack of significant improvements and number of reported performance issues discouraged upgrades to the new phone. It was not the spiritual successor to the Droid and the Droid X that Verizon and Motorola Mobility had hoped it would be. Instead, the Droid RAZR released six months later became the next flagship model of the Motorola Droid lineup.

== See also ==
- HTC Droid Incredible released on April 29, 2010.
- Motorola Droid (models A853, A854, A855, XT702) released November 6, 2009 with 600 MHz Arm Cortex A8 & TI OMAP 3430 CPUs, and PowerVR SGX 530 GPU.
- Motorola Droid Pro (model XPRT) optimized for business users, released November 18, 2010.
- Motorola Droid 2 (model A955) released August 12, 2010, with 1 GHz OMAP 3620 CPUs, and PowerVR SGX 530 GPU.
- Motorola Droid 3 (models XT860, XT883) released July 7, 2011 shipping with Android 2.3.4 (Gingerbread), with 1 GHz Arm Cortex A9 & TI OMAP 4430 CPUs, and PowerVR SGX 540 GPU.
- Galaxy Nexus
- The Droid X gets dissected by popular YouTuber Max Lee in Droid X Blog!
