= HTC Desire S =

2011 Android smartphone

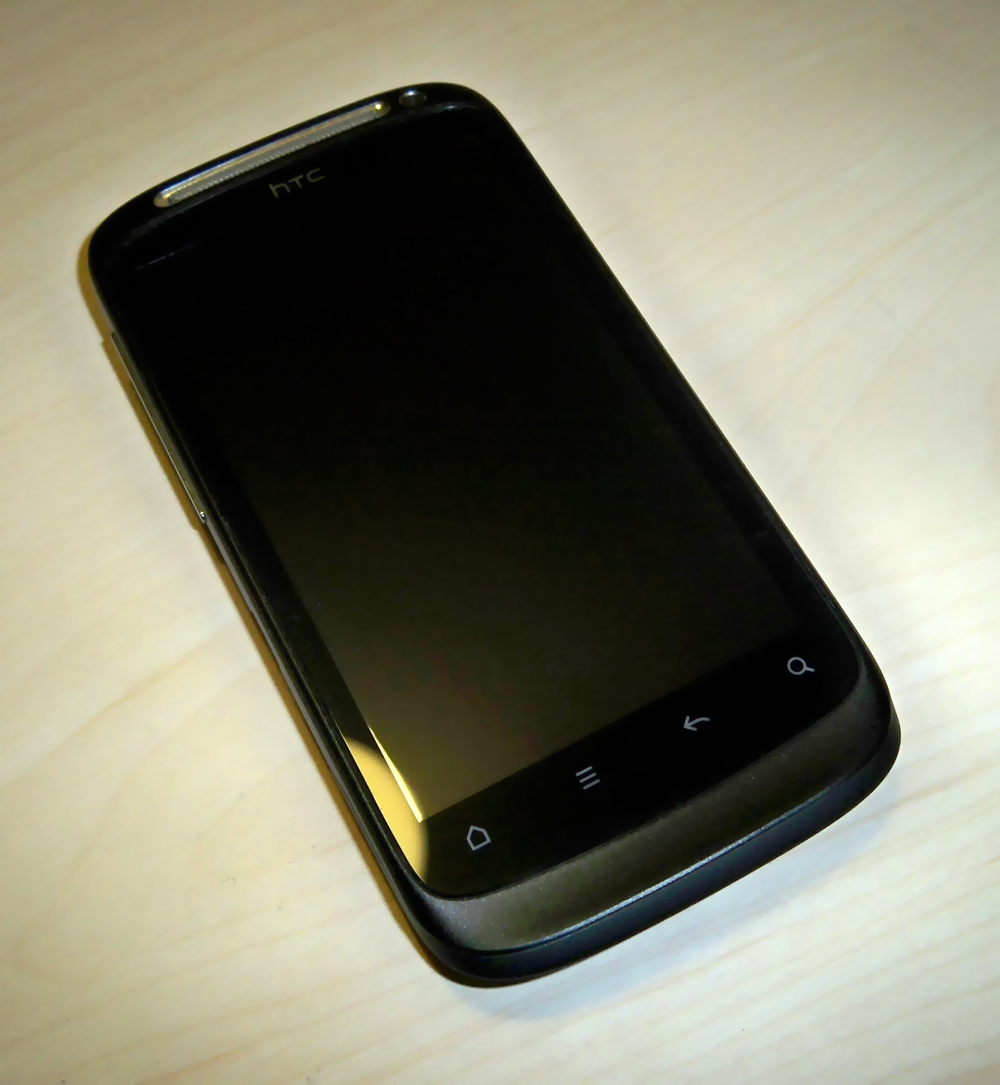
- Manufacturer: HTC Corporation
- Type: Smartphone
- Series: A series
- First released: March 8, 2011; 15 years ago
- Predecessor: HTC Desire
- Successor: HTC Desire X
- Related: HTC Desire Z, HTC Incredible S
- Compatible networks: 2.5G, 3G, HSUPA
- Form factor: Slate
- Dimensions: 115 mm (4.5 in) H 59.8 mm (2.35 in) W 11.6 mm (0.46 in) D
- Weight: 130 g (5 oz)
- Operating system: Android with HTC Sense
- CPU: 1 GHz Qualcomm MSM8255 (Snapdragon)
- GPU: Adreno 205
- Memory: 768 MB RAM
- Storage: 1.1 GB
- Removable storage: Up to 32 GB MicroSD
- Battery: 1450 mAh Lithium-ion battery
- Rear camera: 5 megapixel
- Front camera: VGA
- Display: 94 mm (3.7 in) diagonal 480×800px Super LCD
- Connectivity: Wi-Fi, Bluetooth 3.0, USB 2.0, DLNA, UMA
- Data inputs: Touchscreen, accelerometer, magnetometer, Proximity sensor, Ambient light sensor
- Other: Wi-Fi Hot Spot, FM radio
- References: HTC Desire S

The HTC Desire S (codenamed Saga) is a smartphone designed and manufactured by HTC Corporation that runs the Android operating system. First announced at Mobile World Congress on February 15, 2011 as a successor to the HTC Desire, it was released on March 8, 2011.

The unit shipped with Android (operating system) 2.3.3 (Gingerbread) with HTC Sense 2.1; upgrades were released to Android 2.3.5 with HTC Sense 3.0, and to Android 4.0.4 (Ice Cream Sandwich) with HTC Sense 3.6.

== Hardware ==
The HTC Desire S bears similar internal hardware to its predecessor (HTC Desire). One of the most prominent hardware improvement in the HTC Desire S is the 33% increase in RAM and 100% increase in internal storage capacity. Connectivity in the phone has also seen a noticeable upgrade featuring 14.4 Mbit/s HSDPA and wireless 802.11 b/g/n. The Desire S features an aluminium unibody case and touch-sensitive keys replace the HTC Desire's navigational buttons. The trackball has also been removed.

The display is much the same as the HTC Desire: a 94 mm (3.7 in) diagonal 480×800px (252 ppi) Super LCD overlaid with Gorilla Glass. A front-facing VGA camera is included on the phone in addition to the 5-megapixel rear camera that was also included on the original HTC Desire.

A hardware design flaw or defective eMMC chip in some devices can render the phone unusable (bricked) and require SAT if the battery is removed if the device is on. Updating several applications from market at once can cause the device to not respond, forcing the user to remove the battery to reboot; this is the most usual cause of this problem to appear.

The phone's maximum Wi-Fi speed is 72 Mbit/s when using 802.11n.

== Software ==
The device originally shipped with Android 2.3 and included HTC Sense 2.1. It was later upgraded to Android 2.3.5 with HTC Sense 3.0. The new update added HTC Watch to the list of applications, amongst other features, as well as a new design of the lock screen, and the ability to add icons and widgets onto the lock screen.

HTC released an update to Android 4.0 and HTC Sense 3.6 in August 2012 through their developer website.
