= Droids (role-playing game) =

Tabletop role-playing game

- Designers: Neil Patrick Moore
- Publishers: Integral Games
- Publication: 1983
- Genres: Science fiction

Droids, subtitled "The Cybernetic Role-Playing Game", is a science-fiction robot role-playing game published by Integral Games in 1983.

== Description ==
Droids is a role-playing game where the players take on the roles of robots trying to survive after humanity destroyed their world. The rules cover construction of droids (i.e., character creation), combat, droid society, encounters, and scenarios. The game consists of combat between robots, with the victor scavenging parts from the victim. The rules include an introductory scenario set in a military base.

== Publication history ==
Droids: The Cybernetic Role-Playing Game was designed by Neil Patrick Moore, and published by Integral Games in 1983 as an 80-page digest-sized book. Integral announced that they would be releasing expansions and scenarios, but none were published.

== Reception ==
In Issue 24 of Abyss, Howard Alt called this "a very complicated game ... well thought out, though in a very limited context." Alt called combat "the best aspect, although it is almost impossible to remember all the tables." Alt found the rules "quite arbitrary". Alt also noted that there was "limited interest and variability of the game. Running off scavenging off of other robots can only stay interesting for so long before it becomes a bit repetitive." Despite this Alt concluded, "Droids is an unusual and enjoyable role-playing game with a few weaknesses and a bit high priced, but I can recommend it easily, both as an interesting and coherent game system and as a fun change from traditional gaming."

In Issue 64 of Space Gamer, Tony Watson was not impressed, commenting that "Droids fails as an RPG. A role-playing game requires more than a character generation system and rules for combat. Where the booklet might have some real applicability is as a design system for robots for existing SF RPGs such as Traveller and Star Frontiers." Watson concluded, "The rules provided for designing droids and the comprehensive listings of components are very good, but as an independent role-playing game, Droids is wide of the mark."

In Issue 31 of Different Worlds, Ian R. Beste noted "if you like hack-and-slash, get Droids. If you need some robot design rules for a campaign of, say, The Morrow Project, look at Droids. Otherwise, skip it."
