= Droids (play-by-mail game) =

Play-by-mail game

Droids is a play-by-mail game published by NoGate Consulting.

== Gameplay ==
Droids is an e-mail-based play-by-mail game of robotic warfare designed for IBM-compatible computers. Set on an 80×80 hexagonal grid, the game challenges players to construct, maneuver, and outfit combat robots produced at player-controlled factories. Victory is achieved either by eliminating opponents' mainframes or by reaching a robot production cost double that of the nearest rival. Players receive turn updates via e-mail and respond by issuing commands through an interface that resembles a single-player computer game. Robot movements, factory operations, and module outfitting—such as weapons, shields, sensors, and power supplies—are handled locally. Turn data is then transmitted by modem using standard email services or NoGate's own BBS, with disk mailing as a slower alternative. Players engage in strategic droid construction and must make careful decisions about armament, defense, power systems, and sensor range, knowing that superior customization could make the difference between striking first or being blindsided by a distant foe.

== Reception ==
Stewart Wieck reviewed Droids in White Wolf #21 (June/July 1990), rating it a 2 out of 5 and stated that "While building your droids is a lot of fun, I found that there was very little else to this game."

== Reviews ==
- White Wolf #16
