= Droid 3 =

Android smartphone by Motorola Mobility

Motorola Droid 3 Motorola Milestone 3
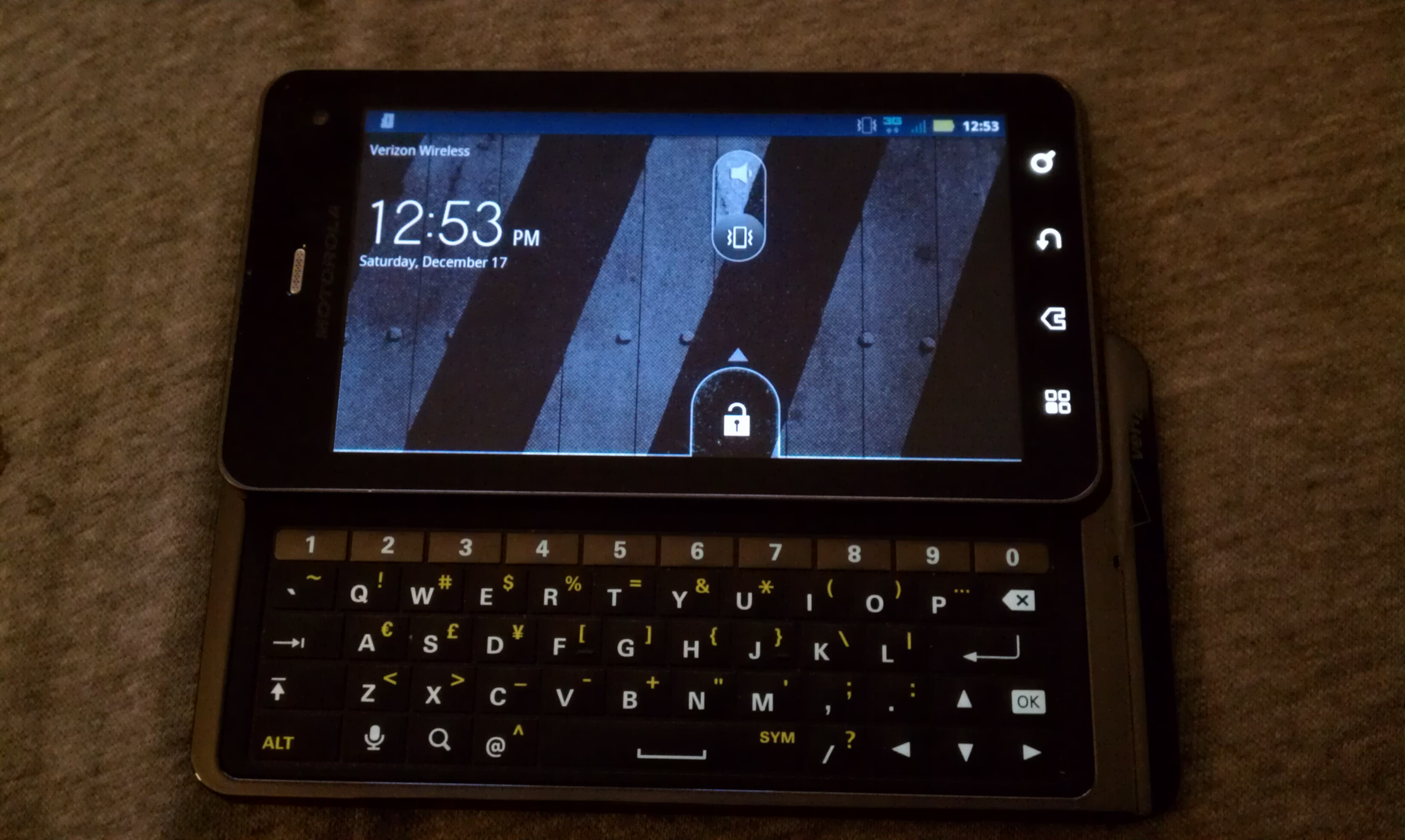
- Manufacturer: Motorola
- Series: Droid
- First released: July 14, 2011; 15 years ago
- Predecessor: Droid 2
- Successor: Droid 4
- Compatible networks: Droid 3: CDMA2000 800/1900, EV-DO Rev. A GSM 850/900/1800/1900 UMTS; WCDMA 850/1900/2100; Milestone 3: quad-band GSM, UMTS 2100 MHz
- Form factor: Slate slider smartphone
- Dimensions: 124 mm (4.9 in) H 64 mm (2.5 in) W 13 mm (0.51 in) D
- Weight: 169 g (6.0 oz)
- Operating system: Official: Android 2.3.4 "Gingerbread", upgradeable to Android 2.3.6 "Gingerbread"; Unofficial: Android 7.1.2 "Nougat" via crDroid
- CPU: 1 GHz dual-core ARM Cortex-A9 SoC processor; TI OMAP4430
- GPU: PowerVR SGX540 @ 304 MHz
- Memory: 512 MB RAM DDR2
- Storage: 16 GB onboard phone, SD card up to 32 GB
- Removable storage: MicroSD, microSDHC, maximum 32 GB
- Battery: 1540 mAh internal rechargeable removable lithium-ion polymer battery
- Rear camera: 8.0-megapixel, autofocus, LED flash, digital zoom, geotagging, 1080p video recording
- Front camera: VGA (0.3-megapixel) fixed-focus color camera
- Display: 960 × 540 px TFT LCD, 4 in (100 mm), 16:9 aspect ratio, qHD
- Connectivity: 3.5 mm TRRS, Bluetooth v2.1 + EDR, Wi-Fi (802.11 b/g/n), Micro USB 2.0, Micro HDMI, DLNA, WLAN, web browser, synchronization
- Data inputs: Slide-out full QWERTY keyboard (approx. 7mm per key)
- Codename: Droid 3: solana Milestone 3: umts_solana
- Hearing aid compatibility: M4/T3
- Other: Virtual QWERTY keyboard (Swype)

The Motorola Droid 3 is a smartphone released on July 7, 2011, by Verizon Wireless running the Android 2.3 operating system by Google. It comes with 16 GB of internal storage. The smartphone does not ship with a microSD card. It has a 4-inch qHD display and an 8-megapixel camera capable of recording 1080p video. Unlike the Droid 2, the Motorola Droid 3 features a 5-row QWERTY keyboard, with a dedicated number row. It also has a VGA front-facing camera for video calls. The Droid 3 ships with Android 2.3.4 (Gingerbread) with Motorola's updated proprietary Motoblur UI. Like other contemporary Motorola phones, it has a locked bootloader, but TWRP can be installed using the SafeStrap exploit, which allows custom ROMs to be installed. The GSM/UMTS version of the Droid 3 was known as the Milestone 3.

== Software updates ==
The Droid 3 received its first OTA system-wide software update on September 30, 2011. A new update, version 5.7.894, leaked on November 6, 2011 and was made available for download. It has not been released as an OTA update. Other versions have leaked, but some were pulled after some phones were rendered unusable after installation. The version listed above is not one that rendered phones useless.

Through January and February, 3 more OTA updates leaked. Versions 5.7.902, 5.7.905 and 5.7.906 were released through January and February 2012. On March 7, 2012, Motorola sent out emails to Motorola Feedback Network members to test a new software update. The update began rolling out on March 9, 2012.

While the Droid 3 did not receive anything later than Android 2.3.6 officially, The Droid 3 would receive custom ROMs for Android Ice Cream Sandwich, Jellybean, and KitKat. The Milestone 3 did not get custom ROMs for Jellybean or KitKat. While a Droid 3 Jellybean or KitKat ROM can be installed on the Milestone 3, it has trouble booting, and the performance is poor.

== Features ==
The smartphone includes regular 3G network, Wi-Fi, HDMI output, 1 GHz OMAP dual-core processor, 512 MB of RAM, a 4.0-inch qHD (960 x 540) display, 3G mobile hotspot capability, an 8-megapixel camera with 1080p HD video capture, and a VGA front-facing camera. The phone comes with Adobe Flash, as well as an HDMI output to an HDTV. The DROID 3 is a global phone, and is distributed by Verizon Wireless in the United States. Motorola DROID 3 was the second dual-core Android handset on Verizon.

== See also ==
- Motorola Droid released November 6, 2009.
- Motorola Droid Pro optimized for business users, released November 18, 2010.
- Motorola Droid X Android 2.3 version hardware released in Mexico.
- Motorola Droid 2 released August 12, 2010.
- Motorola Droid X2 released May 19, 2011.
- Motorola Droid 4 released February 10, 2012.
- List of Android devices
- Galaxy Nexus
