= HTC Incredible S =

Smartphone developed by HTC

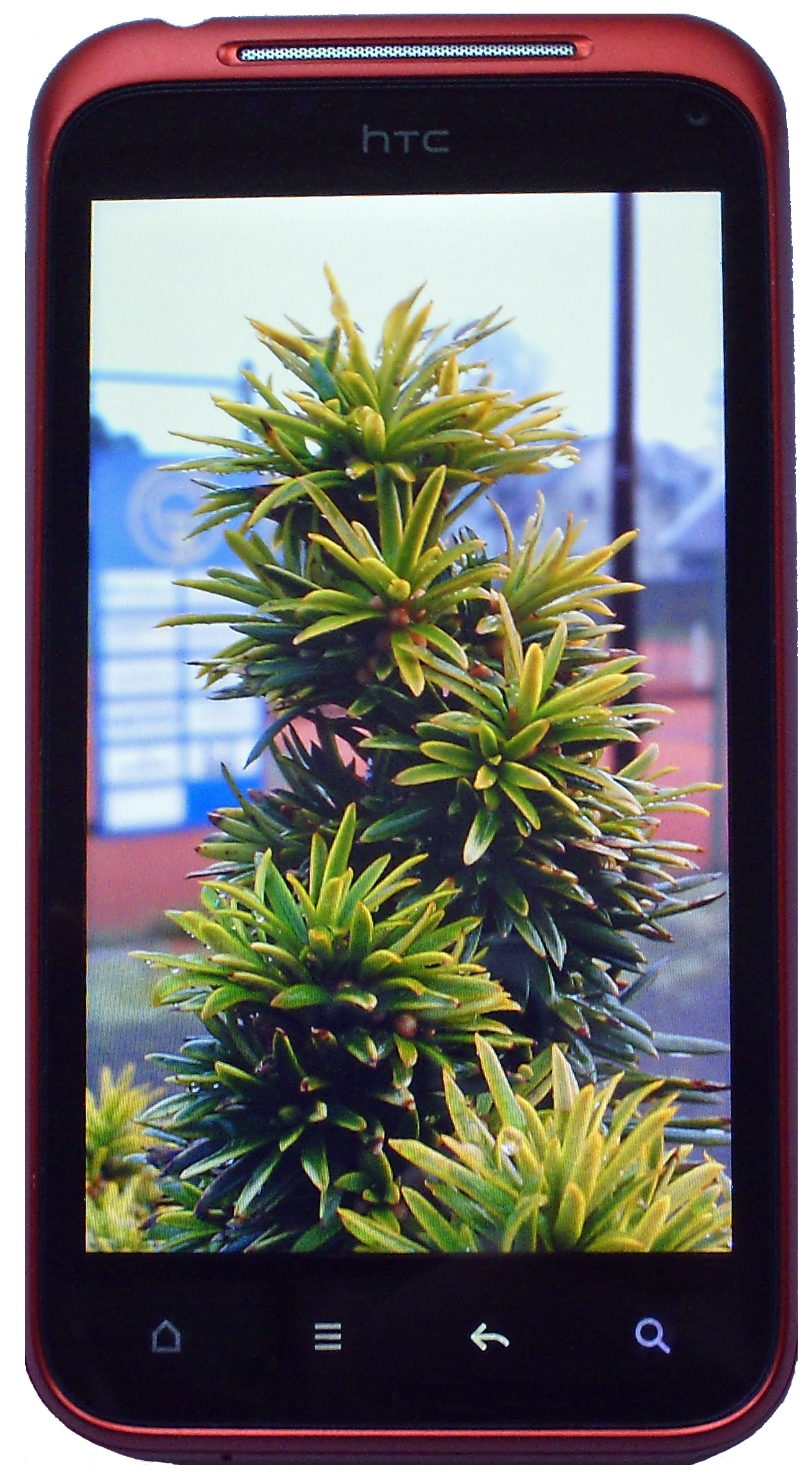
- HTC Incredible S
- Manufacturer: HTC Corporation
- Type: Smartphone
- Series: Incredible
- First released: United Kingdom February 2011; 15 years ago
- Availability by region: United Kingdom; February 26, 2011 (Vodafone); Russia March 17, 2011; Australia May 1, 2011 (Optus); South Korea June 30, 2011; Taiwan March 7, 2011 (Taiwan Mobile)
- Predecessor: HTC Incredible
- Successor: HTC Incredible 4G
- Related: HTC Thunderbolt
- Compatible networks: Quad-band GSM/GPRS/EDGE 850/900/1800/1900 MHz; HSPA/WCDMA Europe/Asia: 900/AWS/2100 MHz (S710e) OR 850/1900/2100 MHz (S710a)
- Form factor: Slate
- Dimensions: 120 mm (4.7 in) H 64 mm (2.5 in) W 11.7 mm (0.46 in) D
- Weight: 135.5 g (4.78 oz) including battery
- Operating system: Android 2.2 Froyo (Upgradeable to 4.0.4 Ice Cream Sandwich)
- CPU: 1 GHz Qualcomm Snapdragon MSM8255
- GPU: Adreno 205
- Memory: 768 MB
- Storage: 1.1 GB
- Removable storage: 32 GB microSD supplied
- Battery: 1,450mAh, 5.6Wh, 3.7V; Internal Rechargeable Li-ion; User replaceable
- Rear camera: 8.0-megapixel (3264x2448); Dual LED flash Autofocus; 720p HD video recording
- Front camera: 1.3-megapixel (1.3.1 mp); Fixed focus
- Display: S-LCD, 4.0 in (100 mm) diagonal 480×800 px WVGA
- Connectivity: 3.5 mm Headphone Jack; Bluetooth 2.1 + EDR with A2DP; FM stereo receiver micro USB 2.0; IEEE 802.11b/g/n Wi-Fi
- Data inputs: A-GPS, Ambient light sensor, Digital compass, G-sensor, Multi-touch capacitive touchscreen, Proximity sensor
- SAR: 0.876 head, 0.776 body (both values w/kg@10g)
- Hearing aid compatibility: M4/T4

The HTC Incredible S (S710E) (s710d), also known as the Droid Incredible 2, is a smartphone designed and manufactured by Taiwan's HTC Corporation originally running the Android 2.2 operating system (since upgraded to 2.3.4 Gingerbread and followed by 4.0.4 Ice Cream Sandwich except for US Droid Incredible 2). Officially announced by HTC on February 15, 2011 at MWC 2011 in Barcelona, Spain, alongside the HTC Desire S and the HTC Wildfire S, the HTC Incredible S was launched exclusively in the UK to Carphone Warehouse and Best Buy on February 26, 2011 marketed by Sarah Harding of Girls Aloud.

The Incredible S is the successor to the Droid Incredible.

== History ==
=== Development ===
During development, the device was codenamed Vivo and little was known about it before release. It is available as a CDMA variant on the US network Verizon as of May 2011 under the name Droid Incredible 2, and it is a world phone able to access both GSM and CDMA networks.

== Hardware ==
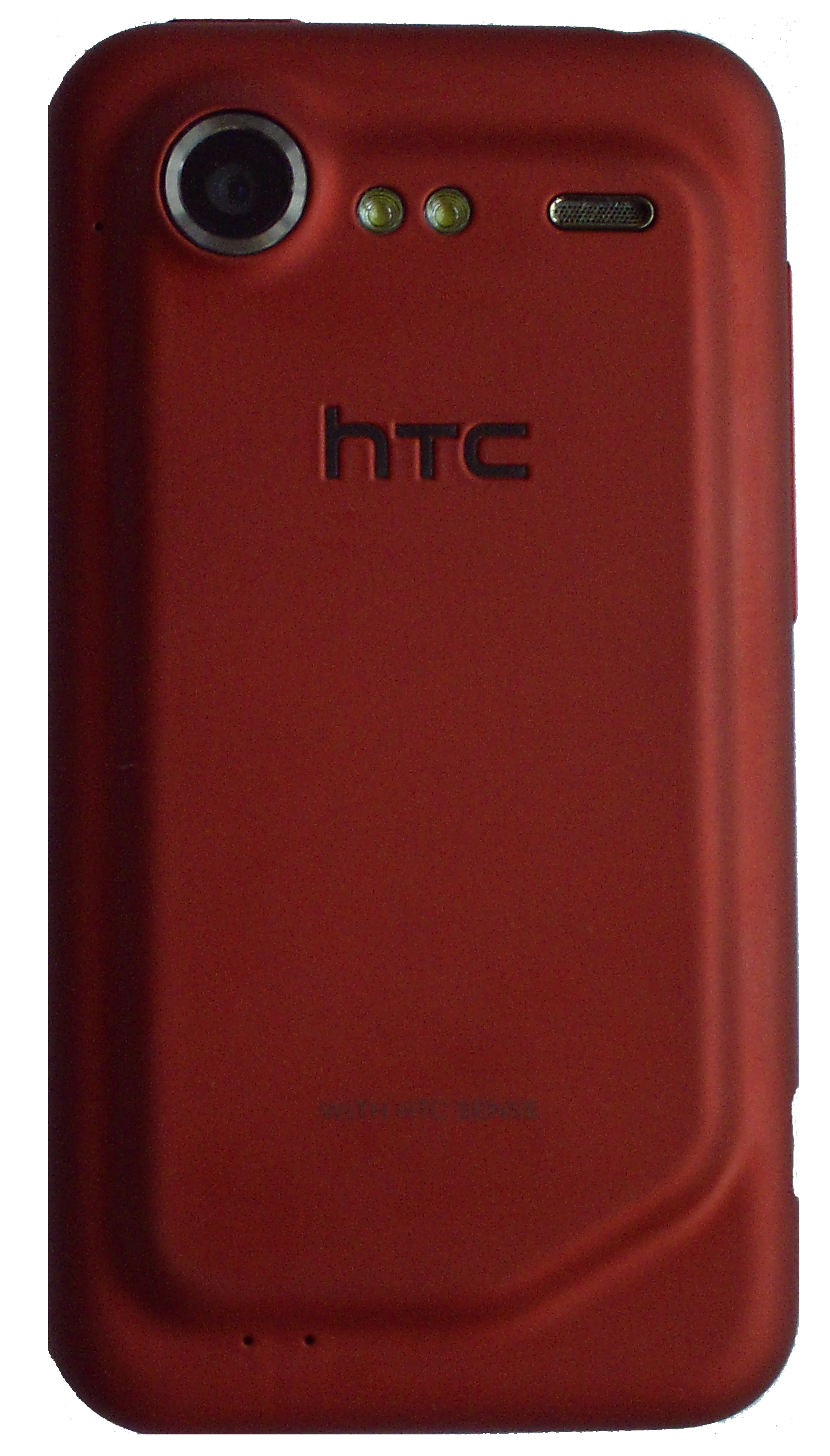
Backside

The HTC Incredible S is the latest of a long line of smartphones based around the 1 GHz Snapdragon chipset made by Qualcomm. In terms of hardware, it is very similar to the Desire HD with a few notable differences:

- Smaller screen: 4.0" compared to 4.3"
- Larger Battery: 1,450 mAh compared to 1230mAh
- Screen technology: An S-LCD screen compared to the original Desire's AMOLED display. However, the Desire's screen was replaced with an S-LCD on later versions.
- Addition of a 1.3 MP fixed-focus front-facing camera for video calling

In a move seen as a new trend for HTC, the antenna for the phone is built into the back cover of the case (this is also true of the HTC Sensation). A unique feature of the Incredible S is the auto-rotating nature of the capacitive buttons below the screen.

Despite HTC recent design trend, the back is made of a rubberised plastic instead an aluminium body, presumably to help improve signal reception. The front is mainly covered by a sheet of Gorilla Glass, with a thin aluminium surround. In addition to the specification already mentioned, the Incredible S houses dual microphones for noise cancellation.

=== Regional variations ===
The version that has been made available in Canada for reviewers has been seen to have chrome accents around the screen, speaker grill, camera lens, LED flash bulbs and loudspeaker which the European and Asian version do not have. A red version was available in Hong Kong and Singapore.

As of November 24, 2011, the HTC Droid Incredible 2 has been available in a limited edition red color, instead of the usual black.

== Software ==
The device shipped with Android 2.2 and HTC Sense 2.0, including a satellite navigation application by TomTom using maps from Route66 (30 day free trial included), and the Kobo Bookstore application preloaded. UK handsets received maps for the UK and Northern Ireland pre-loaded onto the bundled 8 GB microSD card.

The device is a part of the new generation of HTC phones that have a signed bootloader. As a consequence, the phone cannot be easily rooted, and the user is denied administrative rights to the phone. However, users have achieved root despite the signed bootloader, and the handset is supported by the HTCDev Bootloader Unlock tool.

HTC announced the release of an update to Android 2.3.4 and HTC Sense 3.0 in December 2011.

In March 2012, HTC announced the release of Android 4.0 and HTC Sense 3.6 for a range of devices including the Incredible S. Although announced at the same time, as of 2013 the update has not been released in North America for the Droid Incredible 2.

== See also ==
- HTC Desire S
- HTC Desire HD
- Galaxy Nexus
