= Droid 4 =

Android smartphone developed by Motorola Mobility

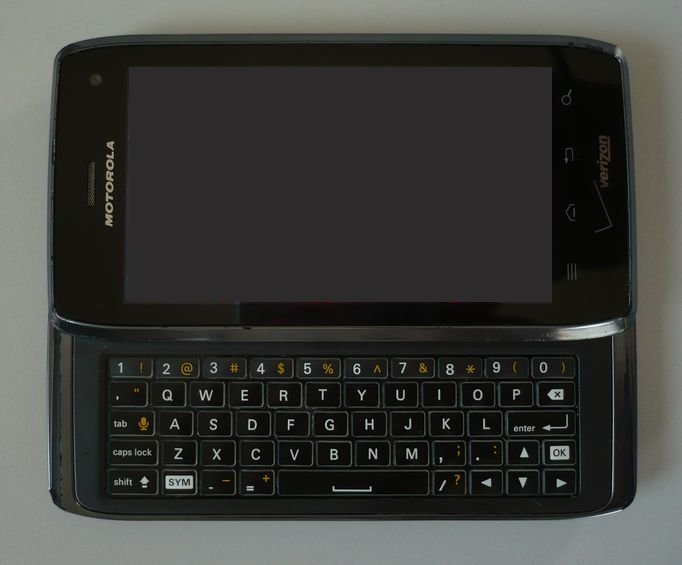
- Manufacturer: Motorola Mobility
- Type: Smartphone
- Series: Droid
- First released: February 10, 2012; 14 years ago
- Predecessor: Droid 3
- Successor: Droid MAXX
- Related: Droid RAZR Motorola Photon Q
- Compatible networks: CDMA 800/1900 MHz EVDO Rev. A, 700 MHz 4G LTE, 802.11b/g/n, quad-band GSM
- Form factor: Slate, slider
- Dimensions: 127 mm (5.0 in) H 67.3 mm (2.65 in) W 12.7 mm (0.50 in) D
- Weight: 180 g (6.3 oz)
- Operating system: Android 4.1.2, Originally shipped with Android 2.3: Up to Android 7.1.2 "Nougat" with LineageOS; Maemo Leste
- CPU: 1.2 GHz dual-core ARM Cortex-A9 SoC processor; TI OMAP4430
- GPU: PowerVR SGX540 @ 304 MHz
- Memory: 1024 MB RAM DDR2
- Storage: 8 GB internal memory
- Removable storage: microSD card up to 32 GB
- Battery: 1785 mAh lithium-ion polymer battery internal
- Rear camera: 8.0-megapixel, autofocus, LED flash, digital zoom, geotagging, 1080p video recording
- Front camera: 1.3 MP, 720p video recording
- Display: 960 × 540 px TFT LCD, 4 in (100 mm), 16:9 aspect ratio, qHD
- Connectivity: Bluetooth v2.1 + EDR, HDMI, 3.5mm TRRS audio jack, Micro USB, DLNA
- Data inputs: Slide-out full QWERTY keyboard
- Codename: maserati
- Hearing aid compatibility: M4/T3
- Website: motorola.com at the Wayback Machine (archived 2013-01-03)

The Motorola Droid 4 (XT894) is a smartphone by Motorola Mobility. It was released on Verizon Wireless's on February 10, 2012 and succeeded the Droid 3. It was launched with Android 2.3 (Gingerbread) and was upgraded to Android 4.1 (Jelly Bean). Droid 4 was one of the first smartphones to support both GLONASS and GPS.

== Processor ==
The Droid 4 has a dual core TI OMAP processor with 1.2 GHz, updated from the Droid 3's dual core 1 GHz processor.

== Webtop ==
Similarly to the Motorola Atrix 4G, the Droid 4 had the integrated Ubuntu-based 'Webtop' application from Motorola. The Webtop application would launch when the phone was connected to an external display through a laptop dock or HD multimedia dock. While in Webtop mode, the phone, operating with a similar UI to one would find on a typical Linux desktop, could run several applications on external display such as Firefox web browser, SNS clients and a 'mobile view' application, enabling total access of Droid 4 and its screen. In September 2011, Motorola released the source code of the Webtop application at SourceForge.

With the release of Android 4.0 Ice Cream Sandwich for the Droid 4, the Webtop application was replaced with ICS's tablet mode. This allows seamless access to all of the phone's applications without moving back and forth between two user interfaces.

== Network roaming ==
As initially marketed by Verizon, when first launched, the Droid 4 was not capable of roaming in countries with non-CDMA wireless networks. However, after installing the update from Android 2.3 to Android 4.0, global roaming is automatically enabled on the handsets, allowing the Droid 4 to use GSM bands and provide HSPA data connections outside the US. However, LTE speeds are only available on Verizon's CDMA network. Unlike previous versions of the phone, the Droid 4 does not have a hot-swappable battery.

== Updates ==
The Droid 4 originally came with Android 2.3 "Gingerbread" out of the box; however, Motorola gradually updated the handset to Android 4.0 "Ice Cream Sandwich" and then finally to Android 4.1 "Jelly Bean". Motorola has also released regular maintenance updates from time to time.

=== Unofficial ===
LineageOS support exists and was being maintained by the community, with LineageOS 14.1 (Android 7.1.2 "Nougat") being the last official port for the device.

As of August 2023, an ongoing effort by the Maemo Leste project to port mainline Linux to the Droid 4 supports most of the device's functionality, including voice phone calls and SMS, except for the cameras. The Maemo Leste project, funded through NLnet and the European Commission's Next Generation Internet program, aims to develop "An independent mobile operating system focused on trustworthiness."
