= Motorola Droid =

Android smartphone developed by Motorola Mobility

Motorola Droid/Milestone

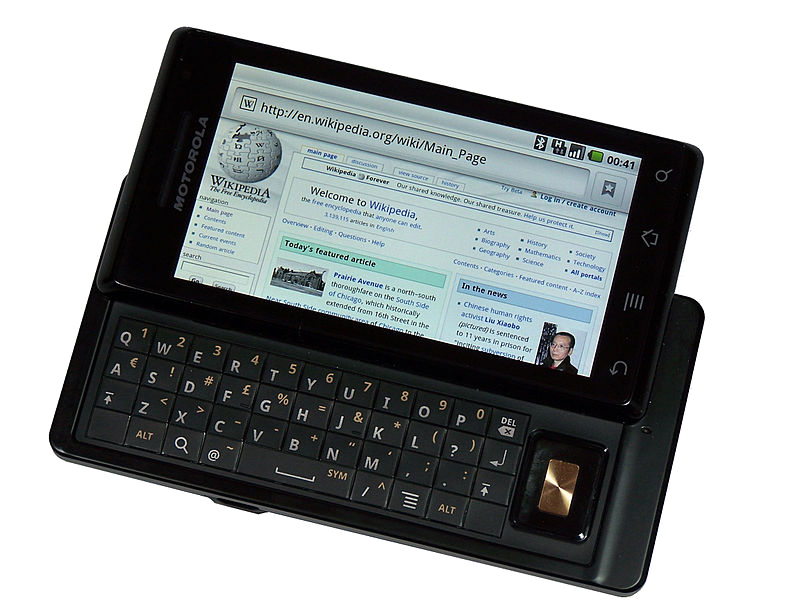
- Manufacturer: Motorola
- Type: Slate slider smartphone
- Series: Droid
- Availability by region: US: November 6, 2009; 16 years ago
- Successor: Droid 2
- Compatible networks: US version: dual band CDMA2000/EV-DO Rev. A 800/1900 MHz; European version quad band GSM, UMTS @ 900/2100MHz; N.A. GSM version quad band GSM, UMTS @ 850/1900 MHz
- Dimensions: 115.8 mm (4.56 in) H 60 mm (2.4 in) W 13.7 mm (0.54 in) D
- Weight: 169 g (6.0 oz)
- Operating system: Android 2.0; 2.0.1 with OTA update (Droid, Milestone) December 2009; 2.1 with OTA update (Droid, Milestone) March 2010; 2.2 with OTA update September 2010; 2.2.1 (FRG83D) 6 December 2010; 2.2.2 (FRG83G) 14 March 2011; 2.2.3 (FRK76) 21 November 2011; 2.3–4.1.1 via unofficial ROMs
- System-on-chip: TI OMAP 3430
- CPU: ARM Cortex-A8 600 MHz underclocked to 550 MHz
- GPU: PowerVR SGX 530
- Memory: 256 MB Mobile DDR SDRAM
- Storage: 512 MB flash memory
- Removable storage: 16 GB Class2 microSDHC included (8 GB Milestone); expandable up to 64 GB
- Battery: Rated 1390 mAh minimum 1420 mAh nominal Internal rechargeable removable lithium-ion polymer battery, talk time 385 minutes, standby time: 270 hours
- Rear camera: 5.0 megapixel with video (720 × 480 px at 30 fps or higher), geotagging, dual LED flash, autofocus
- Display: 854 × 480 px FWVGA, (0.41 megapixels) TFT LCD, 3.7 in (94 mm), 16:9 aspect ratio, 265 pixels per inch (ppi)
- Media: Audio AMR-NB/WB, MP3, PCM / WAV, AAC, AAC+, eAAC+, WMA; Video MPEG-4, H263, H264, WMV
- Connectivity: 3.5 mm CTIA; USB Micro-B; Wi-Fi (802.11b/g), Bluetooth 2.1+EDR, A-GPS
- Data inputs: Capacitive touchscreen display, multitouch, proximity and ambient light sensors, QWERTY keyboard (approx. 7mm per key), 3-axis accelerometer, digital compass, dual microphone
- Hearing aid compatibility: M3/T3
- Other: 430MHz TMS320 C64x DSP (digital signal processor) + ISP (image signal processor)

The Motorola Droid (GSM/UMTS version branded as Motorola Milestone) is a smartphone designed by Motorola, which runs on Google's Android operating system. It was released in late 2009 and was an important "comeback" product for Motorola.

Features of the phone include Wi-Fi networking, a 5-megapixel low light capable digital camera, a standard 3.5 mm headphone jack, interchangeable battery, 3.7-inch 854×480 touchscreen display. It also includes microSDHC support with bundled 16 GB card, free turn-by-turn navigation from Google Maps, sliding QWERTY keyboard, and Texas Instruments OMAP 3430 processor. The Motorola Droid runs Android version 2.2 (Froyo). The phone does not, however, run the re-branded Motoblur interface for Android, instead providing the Google Experience skin and application stack.

With a major marketing push by Motorola and carrier Verizon during and after its November 2009 release, the Droid became popular and had strong sales in the United States. It is credited for having popularized Android in the mass market. The Motorola Droid won Time magazine's 2009 Product of the Year award. It was succeeded by the Droid 2/Milestone 2 in 2010.

== Name and model ==
The Droid had been publicized under the codenames Sholes and Tao and the model number A855.

In Latin America and Europe, the model number is A853 (Milestone), and in Mexico, the model number is A854 (Motoroi). Due to the ambiguity with newer phones with similar names, it is also commonly known as the DROID 1. The brand name Droid is a trademark of Lucasfilm licensed to Verizon Wireless.

== Launch ==
The Droid has a hearing aid compatibility (HAC) rating of M3/T3. The phone was the first to ship with free Google Maps Navigation (beta) installed.

=== United States ===
Verizon explicitly promoted the Droid as an Apple iPhone alternative. Launched on October 17, 2009, TV spots and an associated website made "entertainingly combative" claims listing features then lacking on the iPhone, e.g. "iDon't multitask" and "'iDon't have a real keyboard", only mentioning the name of the Droid in the final frame, reading "Droid Does". At the official launch event on October 28, 2009, Verizon's Chief Marketing Officer John Stratton described the campaign as a spoof of Apple's iPhone ads, intended to "wake up the market."

The marketing for the American launch included "Droid Does Times Square." This was a program (billed as an "interactive experience") in which Verizon connected the Nasdaq and Reuters electronic billboards in Times Square to its systems such that people were able to control the electronic displays by using voice commands (illustrating the voice search function that is a primary Android feature). Control of the billboards was available in Times Square or via the "Droid Does" website.

The November 6, 2009, release date of the Droid came just under a month after Verizon and Google announced that they had agreed to jointly develop wireless devices based on the Android mobile platform. Verizon said at the time that it planned to have two Android-based handsets on the market by year-end with more to come in 2010. The other handset is the HTC Droid Eris, a modification to the HTC Hero, seen in shots of Google CEO Eric Schmidt holding one in a Verizon/Google press conference.

American exclusive software for the Droid includes Google Maps Navigation, an Amazon MP3 Store applet, and Verizon Wireless Visual Voice Mail management.

Analytics firm Flurry estimated that 250,000 Motorola Droid phones were sold in the United States during the phone's first week in stores. Flurry also estimated that 1.05 million Motorola Droids were sold in the first 74 days of the launch. This number is greater than that of the original iPhone which sold one million units through day 74.

== Software ==
This section applies to the Verizon-branded Motorola device in the US. Droid versions in foreign markets (Milestone) may be crippled or have some features disabled due to restrictions enforced by retailer agreements, carrier agreements, manufacturer agreements, or local laws, and should be addressed in the appropriate section above.

The Linux kernel used in the 2.0.1 OTA release is 2.6.29, Android build.

=== Android 2.1 update ===
On February 8, 2010, Motorola announced via Facebook that the Droid update would begin rolling out later that same week. Details were later released via Motorola's official forums. However, the details about the update were later retracted, and unclear information from Motorola and Verizon Wireless caused confusion among many, and technology news websites speculated the update would happen even later in 2010. As an attempt to clear confusion, Motorola released a chart of dates stating when each of their Android devices would be updated to Android 2.1, but this only added to the issues because they said the update would happen "soon", rather than offering a concrete time frame.

However, on March 17, 2010, Verizon Wireless announced that they would issue the Android 2.1 "ESE53" update over-the-air, beginning March 18 to a small test group, and more users would see the update later, into the following week. But screenshots from Verizon Wireless documents showed that a last-minute software bug was found, and the update was delayed once again, with no new rollout date determined.

The new news from Verizon Wireless provided official information about the update and what it entailed, including "Pinch-to-zoom...available when using the browser, Gallery, and Google Maps", a weather and news app/widget including "information you want from the Web...weekly and hourly weather forecasts based on your location, and news headlines", voice-to-text wherever there are text boxes, "New Gallery application with 3D layout", and Live Wallpapers "offer[ing] richer animated, interactive backgrounds on the home screen", as well as other, more minor upgrades. However, the update did not include the addition of two more home screens currently available on the Nexus One, another Android 2.1 device.

The 2.1 update rollout began on March 30, 2010.

=== Android 2.2 update ===
After some apparent discussion by Motorola over whether they would provide an Android 2.2 Froyo upgrade for the Droid and Milestone, it was confirmed that the Droid would get the upgrade, and a staggered rollout began. This rollout began on August 3, 2010, and updates the phone to Android 2.2 build number FRG01B. Another update for the Droid began on August 24, 2010, and it included some minor bug fixes. This update's build number is FRG22D. A third update was released on December 6, 2010, with a version number of 2.2.1 and a build of FRG83D. A fourth update was released on March 9, 2011, with a version number of 2.2.2 and a build of FRG83G. The Motorola support page reported the Milestone version would get an update to Android 2.2 in the first quarter of 2011, and on March 15 an update was made available.

=== Root access and unsupported Android releases ===
The Motorola Droid was successfully "rooted" (manipulated to provide superuser access) on December 8, 2009. This allowed removing sponsored or pay-to-use applets (Amazon, Verizon Visual Voice Mail, etc.), installing and launching custom software, and root access on the phone using a terminal emulator. On June 5, 2010, a leaked Android 2.2 ROM was given to the public for those with superuser access. It includes a new home launcher, Flash 10.1 support, new homescreen widgets, an updated Market, a JIT compiler for a faster system, as well as new aesthetic changes.

As of July 13, 2011, the Droid is able to be updated to the Android 2.3.4 ROM, but with many small updates and edits to the base code in order to properly run.

On July 26, 2011, an Android 2.3.5 ROM was made available for the DROID that, like the Android 2.3.4 ROM, has been modified to improve performance on the smart phone.

Work is currently underway at xda-developers to bring Android 4.0, Ice Cream Sandwich, to the Motorola Droid/Milestone, although CyanogenMod has stated it will drop support for the Droid/Milestone in ICS-based CyanogenMod 9.

As of July 17, 2012, the Droid is able to be updated to the Android 4.0.4 ROM. Similar to previous Gingerbread ROMs, this ROM has been tweaked to properly run.

As of August 27, 2012, the Droid can be updated to the Android 4.1.1 ROM. This ROM is currently being worked on and tweaked to properly run.

== Motorola Milestone ==
The quad-band GSM/UMTS version of the Droid is the Motorola A853 (Milestone). While the phone's internal hardware (besides cellular) is the same, differences include out-of-the-box multi-touch support enabled, a trial version of Motorola's MOTONAV service (instead of Droid's US-only Google Maps Navigation) and an 8 GB microSDHC card, instead of the Droid's 16 GB microSDHC card.

=== Geographic launch information ===
The launch countries for the Motorola Milestone included Germany, Italy, and Argentina on November 9, 2009. Other European countries soon followed.

Joining this trend, a new, North American, version of the Motorola Milestone was released in Canada in February 2010. This new version supports 3G bands II and V instead of bands I and VIII so it is compatible with Rogers, Bell, and Telus in Canada, and with AT&T and T-Mobile (2G Only) in the US. At this time, Motorola Milestone is only available from Telus. The Milestone is also available in the U.S. from several regional GSM carriers, like Cincinnati Bell.

==== United Kingdom ====
The phone was launched in the United Kingdom on Thursday December 10, 2009, as the Motorola Milestone. The exclusive sales outlet for the phone, eXpansys, reported that all stocks of the phone had completely sold out within 3 hours of its debut. The sell-out was considered a major victory for Motorola, which had had little success with its prior Windows Mobile-based phones, and had been counting on Android-based phones for future growth.

==== Middle East ====
The phone was launched in the Middle East in 2010, it included a serious limitation as Google prohibited access to its Android Market application for most Middle Eastern countries. No reasonable alternative was provided by Google.

==== Asia, India ====
The Milestone was launched in Hong Kong on December 21, 2009, as the sixth Android device in the region for HKD 4,680 with an 8 GB microSDHC card included. This version is in English but supports Chinese handwriting that originated from the Motorola MING and pinyin input method. While MOTONAV is included, it does not work and is not officially supported. The phone can be updated to Android 2.1 since Q1 2010, the update features a Chinese user interface and more Chinese input methods such as Changjie. The Milestone launched in India on 30 March 2010, priced at 32,000 INR, approximately US$680.

=== Locked bootloader ===
Unlike the DROID, the Milestone has a bootloader that only allows signed firmware to load. This creates difficulties for users who wish to boot custom ROM images not signed by Motorola that have become popular in the Droid modding community. This has caused discontent in the Droid community in markets foreign to the US, with numerous petitions being created. Whether the disabling of custom boot loaders is due to retailer, carrier, manufacturer, or legal restrictions is unknown.

Early in 2011 the community around Milestone ROM-Development and the Polish National BOINC Team initiated AndrOINC to decipher the RSA 1024-bit signature and make customizing possible. The project has been down since April 2011 because the German police confiscated the server on suspicion that it was involved with an illegal P2P service.

In June 2011, Motorola committed to delivering an unlockable and relockable bootloader solution for phones receiving updates later that year. This will likely not include the Milestone as Motorola has not indicated it will update the Milestone past Android 2.2/Froyo.

==== Root access ====
Despite the locked bootloader, the Motorola Milestone has been successfully rooted. Several step-by-step guides are available on the web.

=== Software releases ===
==== 2.0.1 update ====
Two months after Motorola Droid received the update, the 2.0.1 update was released to fix a bug with the camera autofocus.

==== 2.1 update ====
The Motorola Milestone update rolled out in the beginning of May 2010, five months after the introduction of Android 2.1. After the update several problems were discovered, but since then firmware 2.1 update 1 has been released, which fixes some of the issues. Although Motorola claimed, that they have fixed the random MP3 player start problems, they still occur. These problems affect only some users.

==== 2.2 update ====
The official Android 2.2 Froyo update was released on March 16, 2011, for UK users with a slow rollout to the rest of Europe. As of March 20, the update was still being rolled out and was not available in all countries. Community-created ROMs of Android 2.2 (Froyo), Android 2.3 (Gingerbread), and Android 4 (Ice Cream Sandwich) have existed for some time, typically based on kernels from leaked updates.

The continued postponing of Milestone updates has become known under the term "Motofail" in Central and South America.

- See Android operating system for later software releases.

== Motorola Motoroi ==
In July 2010, Motorola launched the phone for Mexico as the Motorola A854 (MOTOROI) and became exclusive to the CDMA network carrier Iusacell. Its history is similar to the Motorola Droid and Motorola Milestone.

== See also ==
- Verizon Droid family
