= Grillo telephone =

1960s flip phone telephone from Italy

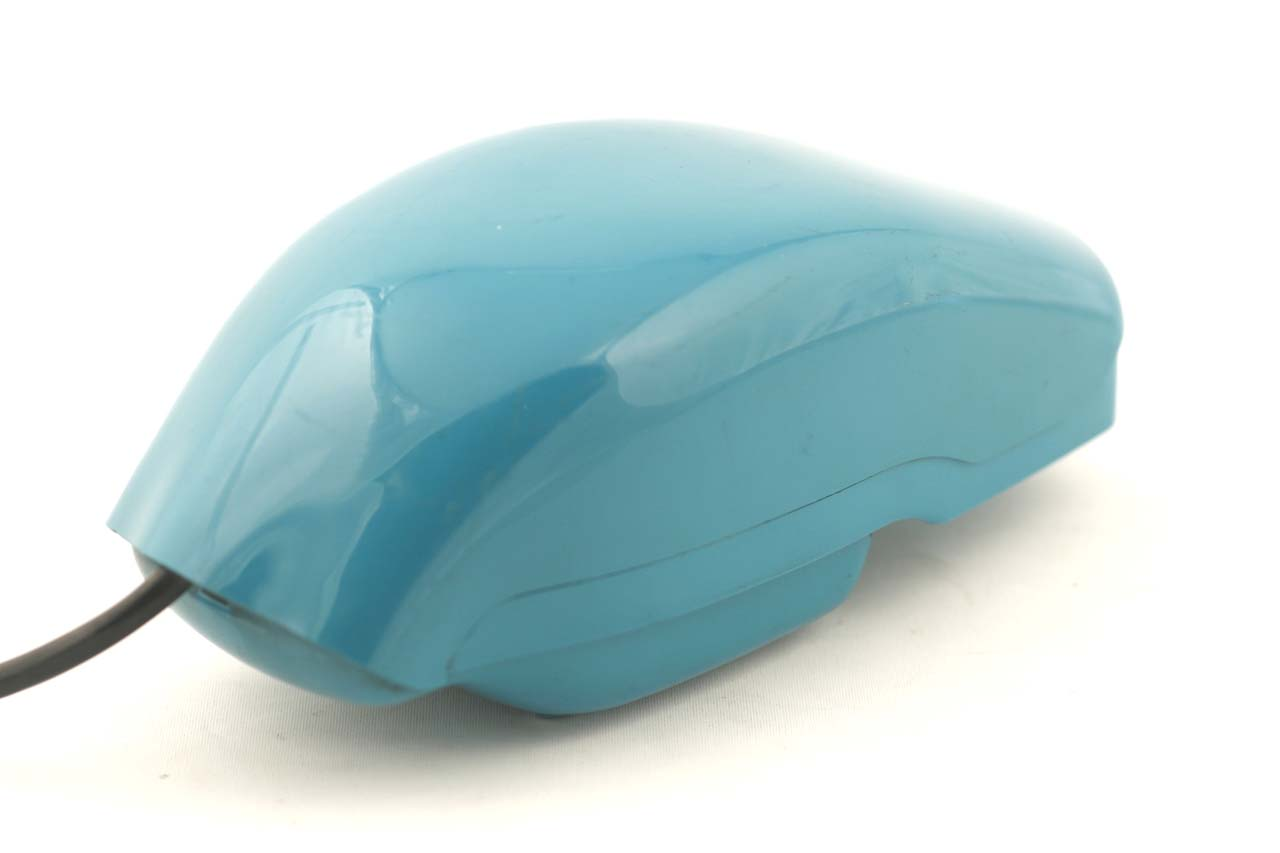
- Grillo telephone designed by Richard Sapper and Marco Zanuso
- Type: Domestic flip-phone telephone
- Inception: 1966
- Manufacturer: Siemens Italtel (Note: A subsidiary of former state-owned telecommunications company SIP (now part of Telecom Italia).)
- Last production year: 1979
- Slogan: Il telefono in palma di mano; 'The phone in the palm of your hand'
- Notes; Winner of the 1967 Compasso d'Oro award and the Ljubljna Biennale of Design gold medal in 1968.

- Specifications
- Materials: ABS plastic, metal, rubber
- Height: 6.6 cm (2 5/8 in.)
- Width: 15.5 cm (6 1/8 in.)
- Depth: 7.5 cm (2 15/16 in.)

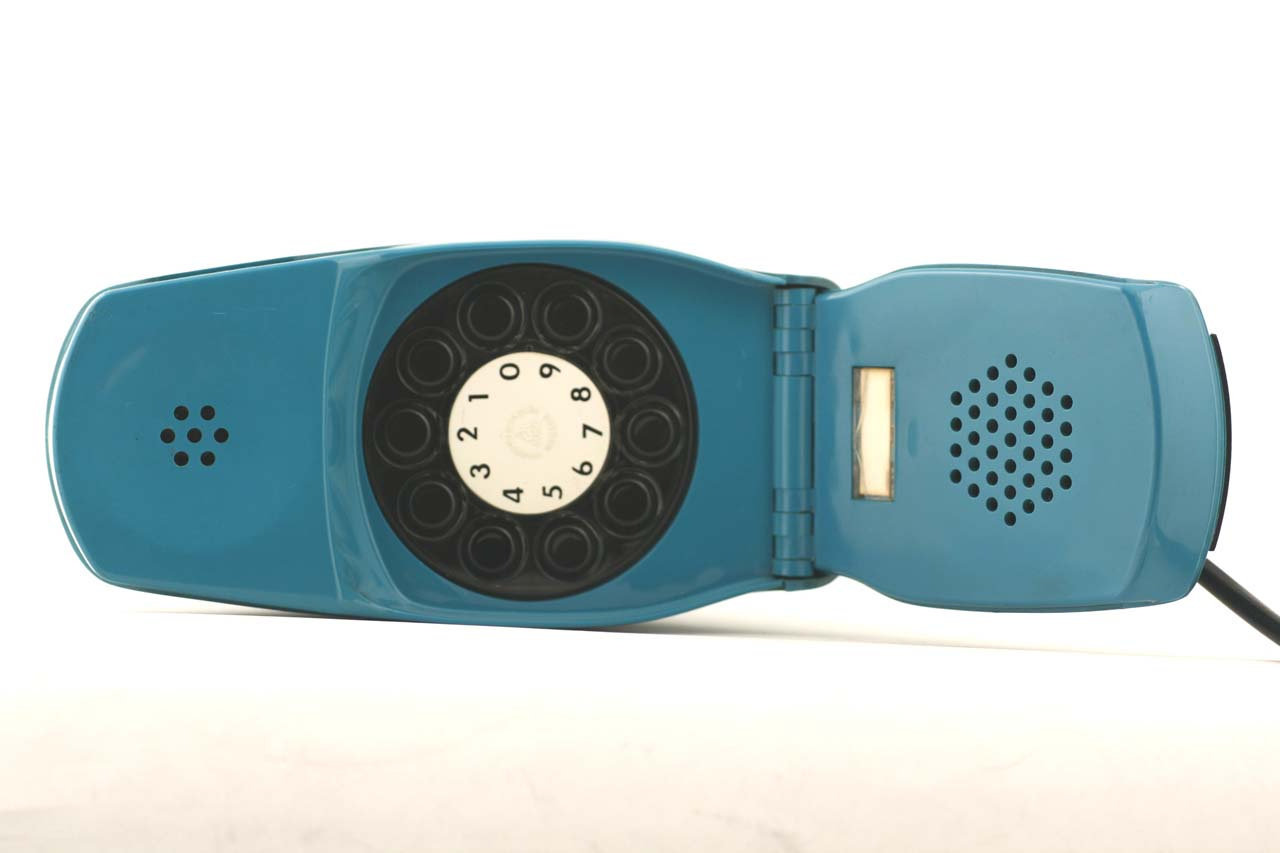
Grillo telephone designed by Richard Sapper and Marco Zanuso telephone (open, showing button dial)

The Grillo telephone is a 1960s flip-phone telephone from Italy. It was designed by Richard Sapper and Marco Zanuso, and manufactured by Siemens for Italtel. Introduced in 1966, the "Grillo" remained in production until 1979, and was a popular and iconic symbol of 1960s Italian design.

== Design ==
The modern styling, compact form factor, and automatically opening clamshell design set "Grillo" apart from other telephones that were available at the time. Innovative features that contributed to the phone's compact size include a dial that replaced the conventional rotary finger stop mechanism with a button in each of the number holes which, when actioned, pushed a pin through the back of the dial to stop the mechanism in its correct position. The incorporation of the ringer mechanism into the wall plug rather than the phone itself, as well as the use of a moulded ABS plastic shell helped reduce both the size and weight of the handset. The name "Grillo", which means cricket in Italian, "derives from its shape and its chirping ringtone: an insect-like metallic chirp has replaced the harassing ring."

"Grillo" was designed in 1965 by Richard Sapper and Marco Zanuso, who, as a team, also collaborated with Italian companies such as Brionvega, Gavina, Kartell, and Alfa Romeo throughout the 1960s and 1970s. The design was awarded the 1967 Compasso d'oro in Milan and the Gold Medal at the 1968 Ljubljna Biennale of Design (BIO3). Examples are held in many museum collections, including the Museum of Modern Art and the Cooper Hewitt, Smithsonian Design Museum in New York, the Philadelphia Museum of Art, the Israel Museum in Jerusalem, the Pompidou Centre in Paris, and the ADI Design Museum and Museo Nazionale Scienza e Tecnologia in Milan.

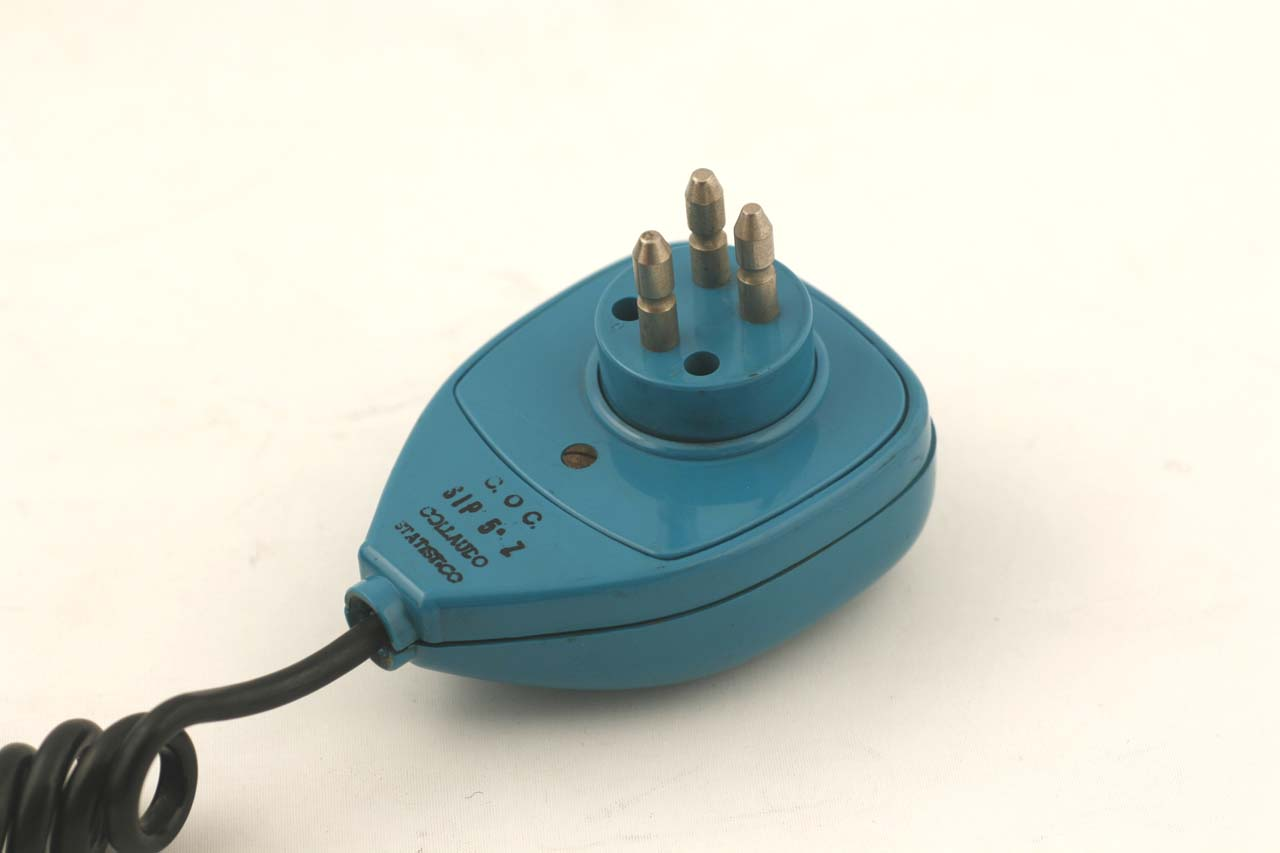
Grillo telephone (wall plug with integrated ringer)

The "Grillo" would subsequently influence the design of flip phone mobile telephones developed during the 1990s like the Motorola StarTAC and RAZR, as well other electronic devices such as portable computers and games.

== In popular culture ==
The "Grillo" telephone appears in multiple episodes of the original 1960s Mission Impossible television series.

The car phone depicted in the early 1970s American television series The Magician is a "Grillo" telephone.

Patrizia Reggiani (played by Lady Gaga) uses a "Grillo" telephone in the 2021 film House of Gucci.

== Gallery ==
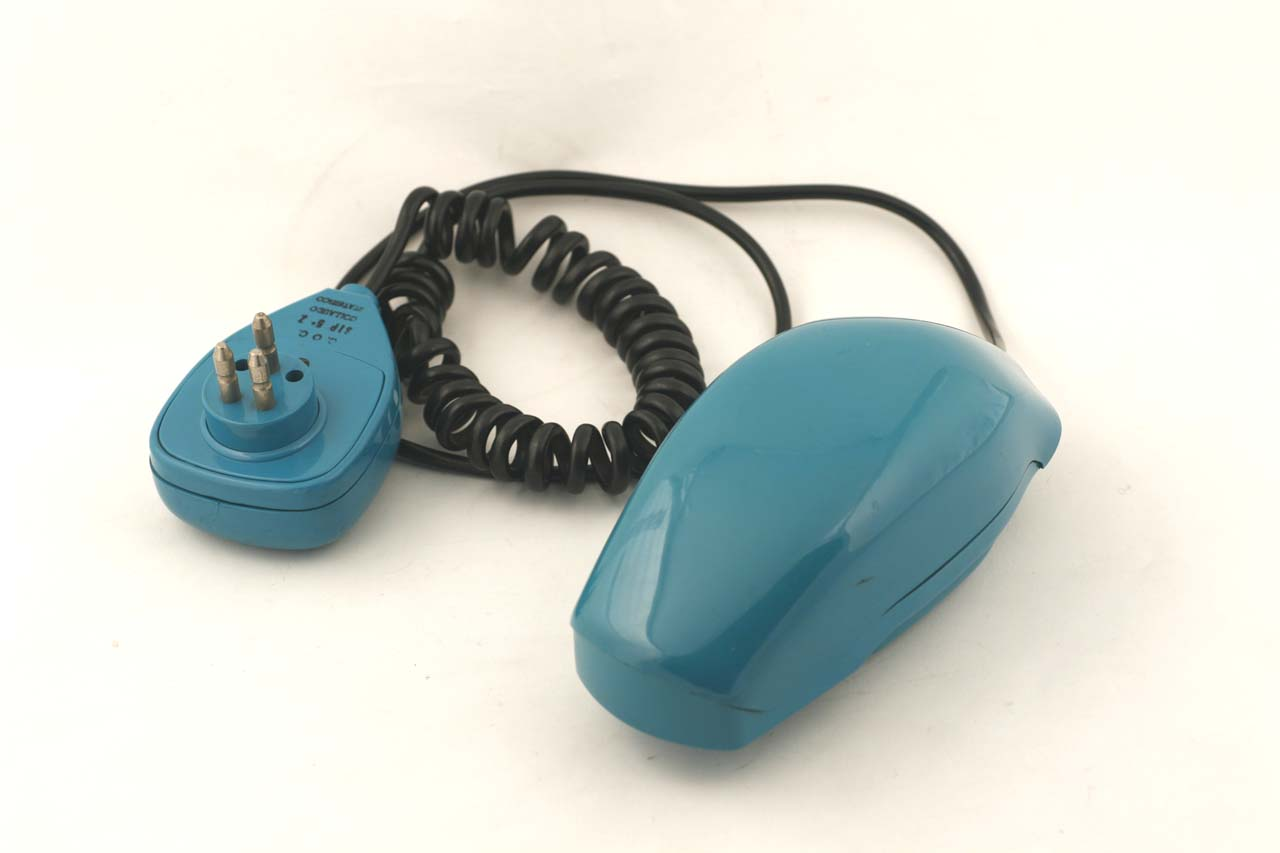
Complete unit with body and wall plug/ringer

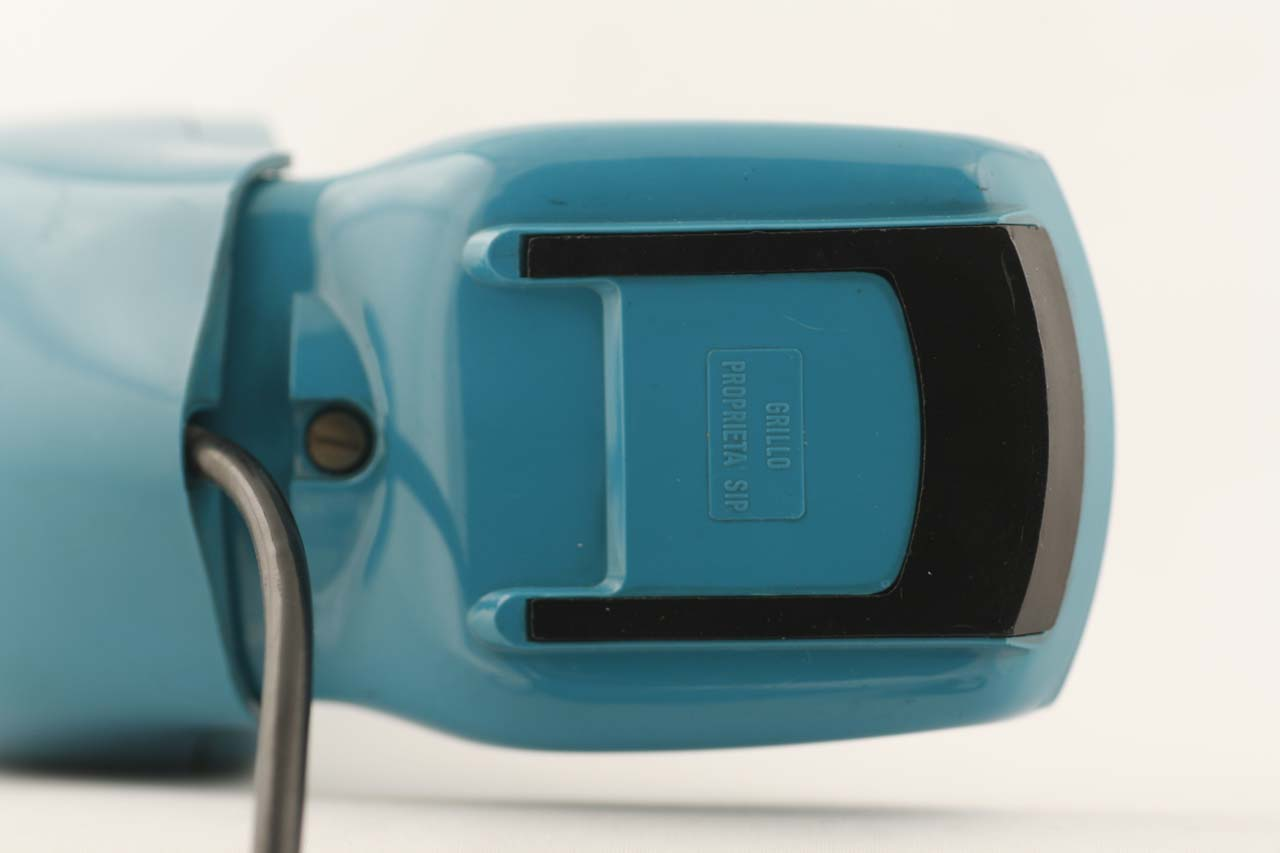
Detail showing underside of base

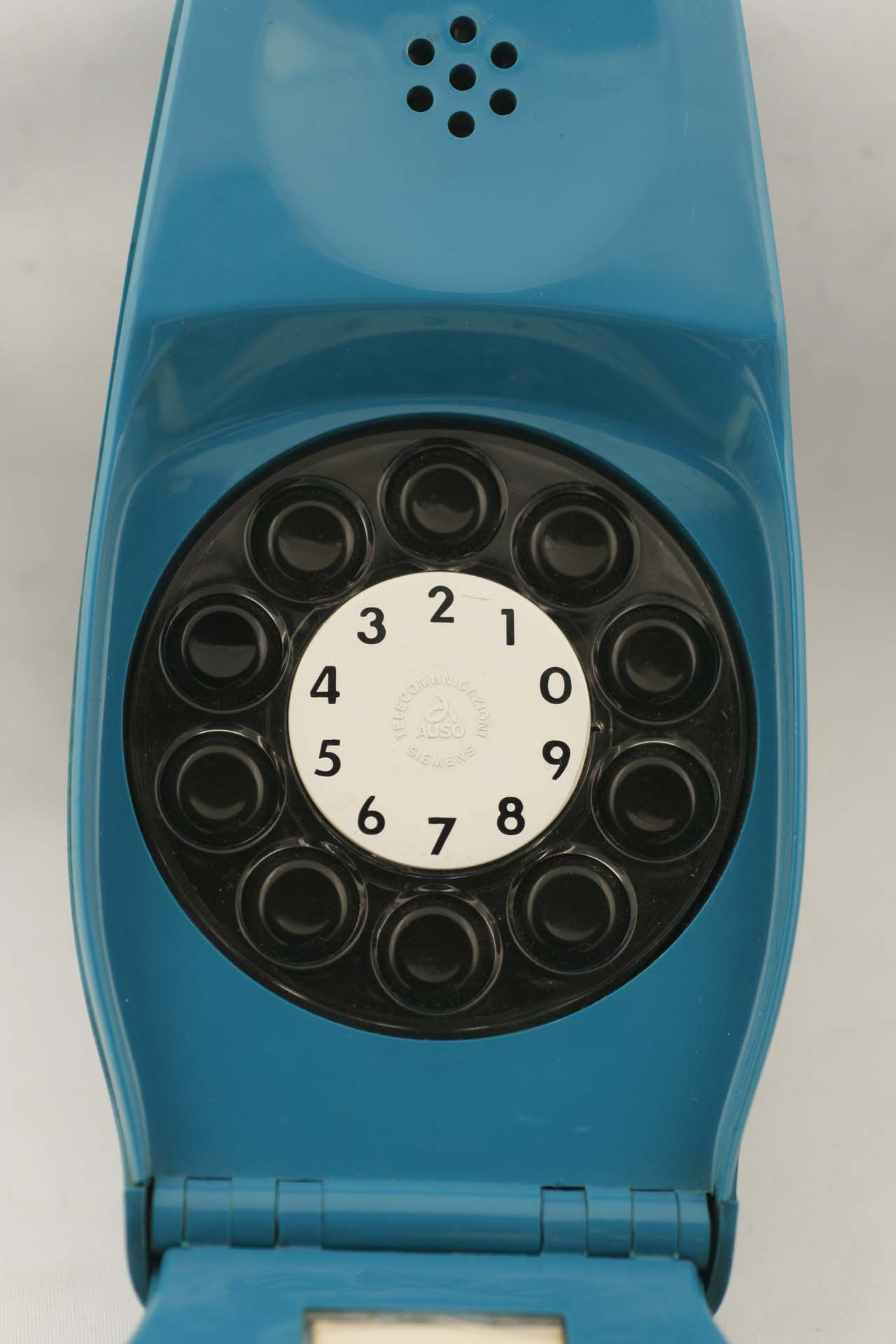
Detail showing button dial mechanism

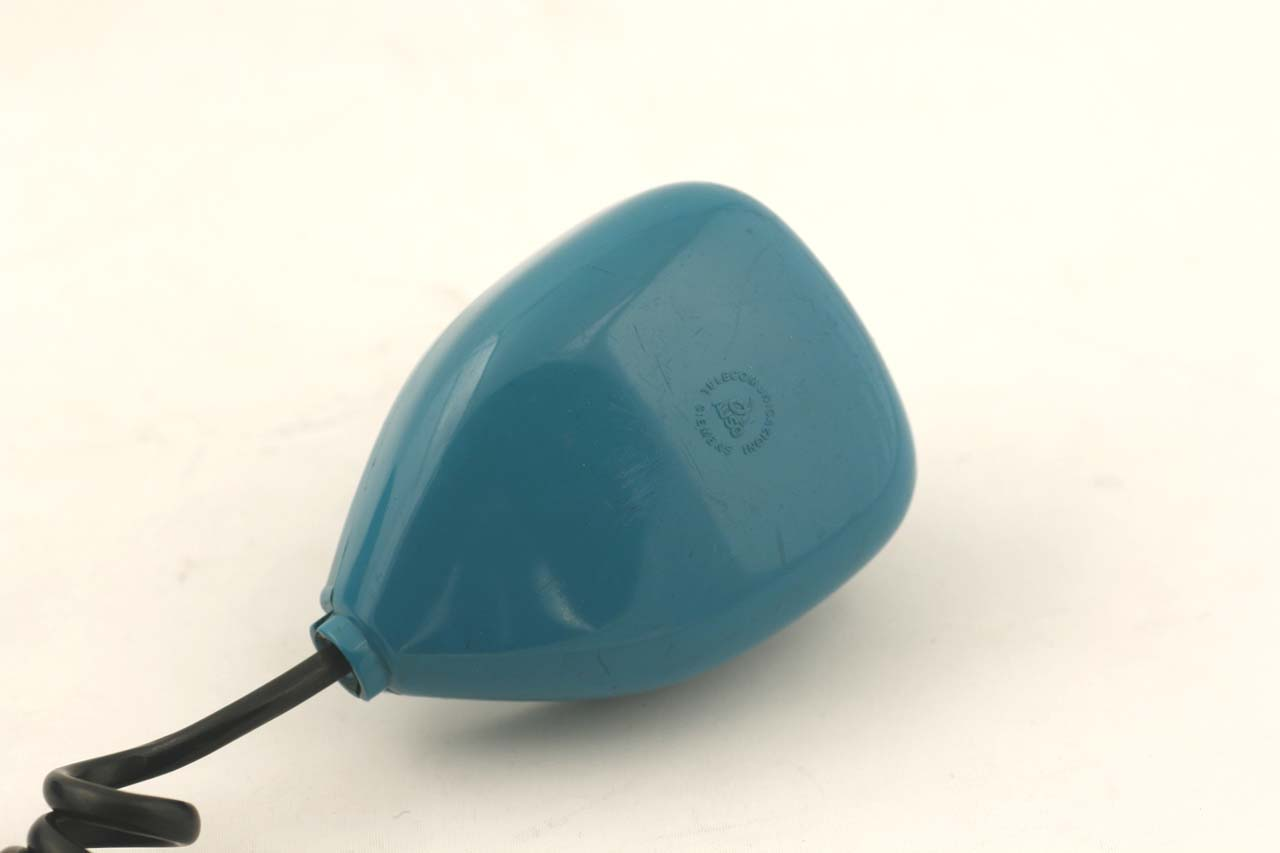
Detail showing wall plug/ringer casing

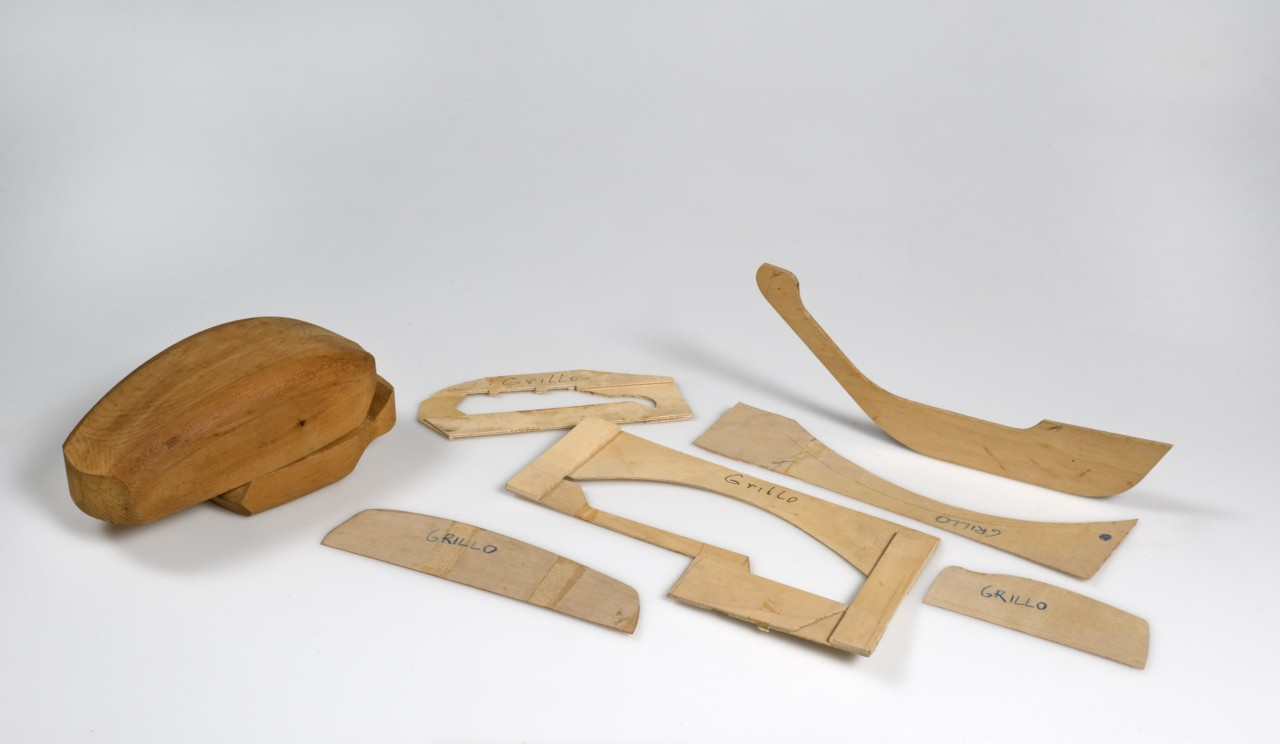
Wooden model of the Grillo made by Giovanni Sacchi

== See also ==
- Communicator – Fictional technological device in Star Trek
- Ericofon – Telephone designed by Swedish company Ericsson
- Trimphone – 1960s British telephone model
- Motorola StarTAC – Mobile phone
- Motorola RAZR – Series of mobile phones by Motorola Mobility
- Index of telephone-related articles
