= Droid Razr HD =

Android smartphone developed by Motorola Mobility

Motorola Droid Razr HD/XT926

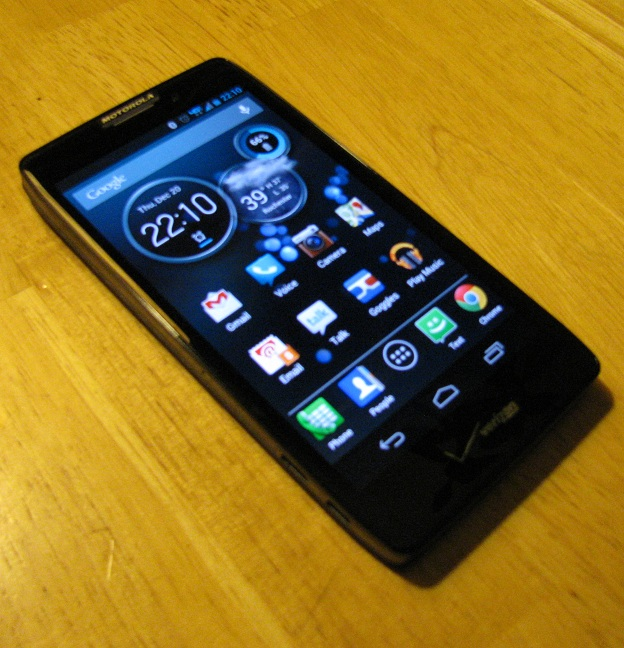
- The Droid Razr Maxx HD variant
- Brand: Droid
- Manufacturer: Motorola Mobility
- Type: Smartphone
- Series: Motorola Razr, Droid
- First released: 18 October 2012
- Availability by region: United States October 18, 2012 (Verizon); Motorola Razr HD (non-Droid branded variants) List: Germany October 2, 2012 (O2 and Retail); UK October 2, 2012 (Retail); France October 2, 2012 (Orange, Vodafone and Retail); Australia October 2, 2012 (Telstra); Canada October 10, 2012 (Rogers); Mexico November 6, 2012 (Telcel)
- Predecessor: Droid Razr
- Successor: Droid Ultra; Droid Maxx; Moto X (2013) (Razr HD)
- Related: Droid Razr M Droid Razr i Motorola RAZR HD
- Compatible networks: List: CDMA EV-DO rev A; 800, 1900MHz; GSM/GPRS/EDGE 850, 900, 1800, 1900 MHz; UMTS 850, 900, 1900, 2100 MHz; LTE 700 MHz Class 13; HSDPA+ (4G) 21.1 Mbit/s; HSUPA 5.76 Mbit/s
- Form factor: Slate
- Dimensions: 131.9 mm (5.19 in) H 67.9 mm (2.67 in) W 8.4 mm (0.33 in) D 9.3 mm (0.37 in) D (Droid Razr Maxx HD)
- Weight: 146 g (5.1 oz); 157 g (5.5 oz) (Droid Razr Maxx HD)
- Operating system: Android 4.0.4 upgradable to 4.4.2 KitKat
- System-on-chip: Snapdragon S4 MSM8960
- CPU: 1.5 GHz dual-core Krait
- GPU: Adreno 225
- Memory: 1GB Dual-channel, 500 MHz LPDDR2 RAM
- Storage: 16 GB (12 GB user available) flash memory (32 GB MAXX version)
- Removable storage: microSD up to 32 GB
- Battery: 2,530 mAh; 3,300 mAh (Droid Razr Maxx HD)
- Rear camera: 8 MP (3264×2448 px) 6 MP (3264×1840 px in widescreen mode to fit screen aspect ratio) 1080p video recording (1920×1080, 30 fps)
- Front camera: 1.3 MP (1280×720 px)
- Display: 4.7 in (120 mm) diagonal 16:9 aspect ratio widescreen Super AMOLED capacitive, multi-touch touchscreen 720x1280 pixels (312 ppi) 16 M colors
- Sound: Speaker, 3.5mm stereo audio jack
- Connectivity: List: 3.5 mm stereo audio jack; USB 2.0 Host micro USB; MicroHDMI; Wi-Fi 802.11a/b/g/n (2.4,5 GHz); 4.0 EDR; 4GWi-Fi hotspot; aGPS (assisted); sGPS (simultaneous); NFC; GLONASS
- SAR: Head 0.97 W/kg; Body 0.46 W/kg
- Hearing aid compatibility: M4, T4
- Other: Talk Time: Up to 16 hours (21 hours for Maxx variant) Standby Time: Up to 11.9 days (15.5 days for Maxx variant); Damage-resistance: Corning Gorilla Glass screen, DuPont Kevlar backing, Water-repellent nanocoating Media sharing: DLNA Compatibility Available in "Blue", "Black", and "White"

The Droid Razr HD and Droid Razr Maxx HD are Android-based, 4G LTE-capable smartphones designed by Motorola as the successor to the Droid Razr series released nearly a year prior. Notable changes from their predecessors include 720p resolution displays and increased display size while maintaining similar overall dimensions. Additionally, the battery capacity on the standard Razr HD is 42% larger than its predecessor. Both go by the model number XT926. These phones were released on October 18, 2012 exclusively on Verizon Wireless in the United States. The Motorola Razr HD (non-Droid branded variants, model number XT925) were available as international or global phones in Europe, Latin America, Australia and Canada as early as October 2, 2012. In the summer of 2013, storyboards surfaced of television commercials that have not yet aired. These commercials will feature the Droid Maxx and Droid Ultra, the apparent successors to the Droid Razr Maxx HD and Droid Razr HD, respectively.

== History ==
The Droid Razr HD and Razr Maxx HD were announced alongside the more compact Droid Razr M on 5 September 2012. The Razr HD and M models first shipped with Android 4.0.4 (Ice Cream Sandwich). The Razr HD models were both upgraded to Android 4.1.1 (Jelly Bean) starting December 3, 2012. The Razr and Razr Maxx HD both got upgrades to Android 4.1.2 (update 9.16.6) on March 18, 2013. Included were connectivity and security improvements as well as camera upgrades. Earlier leaked code names include the Motorola Droid Fighter and Motorola Droid Vanquish. In May 2014, the phone was then again updated at version 4.4.2 KitKat.

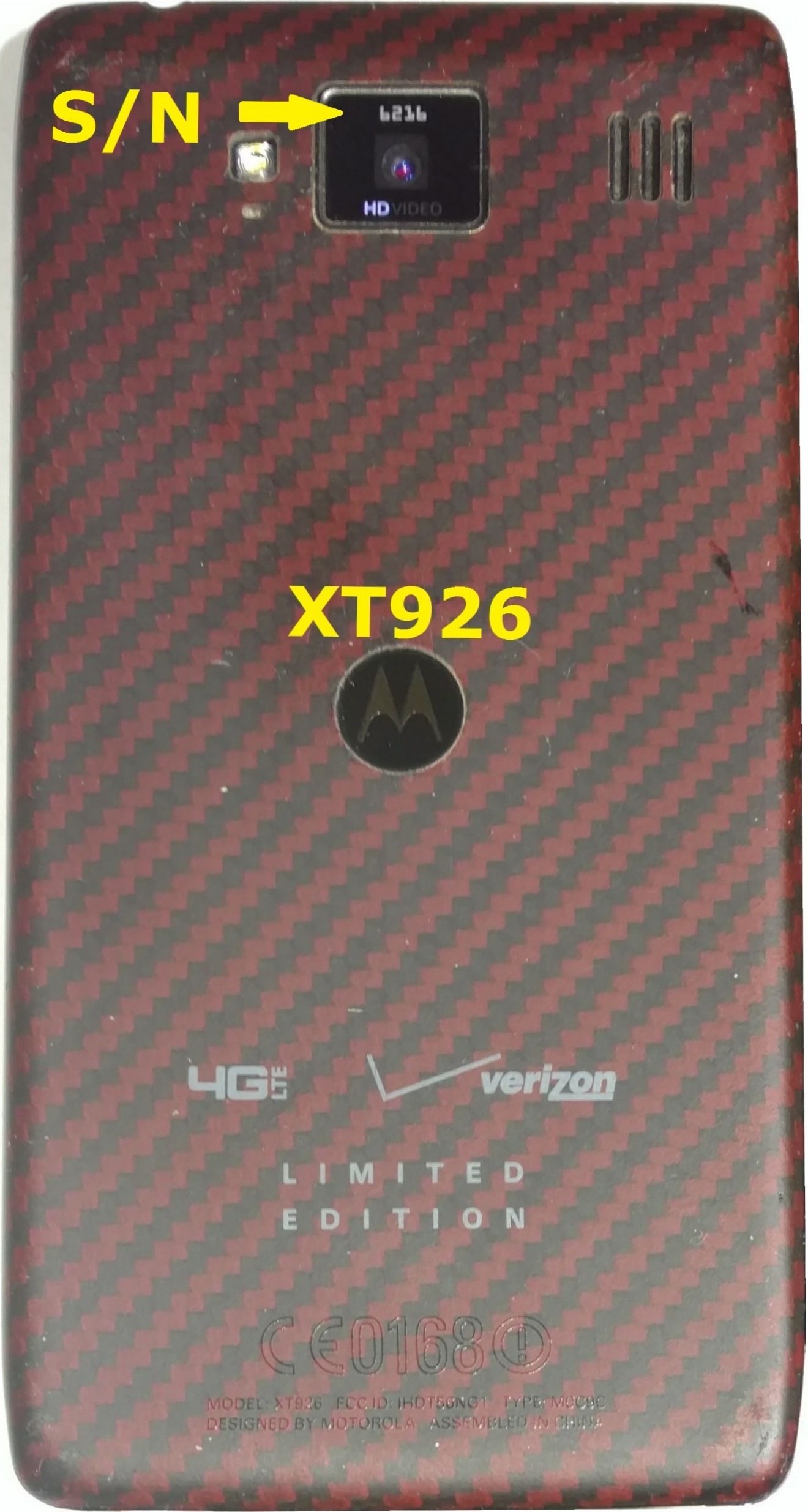
Back of Droid Razr Maxx HD Limited Edition for Verizon showing cosmetic variations.

== Features ==
Motorola Mobility has chosen to differentiate the Droid series from other Android devices primarily by focusing on a superior battery capacity both for the standard and Maxx variants. An often compared competitor, the Samsung Galaxy SIII, has a 2100 mAh battery compared to the standard 2530 mAh Razr HD and the 3300 mAh Razr Maxx HD. Motorola claims that this equates to 20% on the Razr HD and 50% longer battery life on the Razr HD Maxx. Other critical reviews have noted the durability and rugged feel when describing the DuPont Kevlar backing. Additional durability is touted with a Corning Gorilla Glass display claiming to minimize scratches and an internal water-repellent nano-coating to resist liquids from affecting components.

Additionally, the Razr HD has a 4.7 inch 1,280×720 resolution Super AMOLED display with a 312 pixels per inch pixel density. The phone has an 8-megapixel rear camera, 1.3-megapixel front-facing camera and a 1.5 GHz dual-core Snapdragon S4 ("Krait") processor with LTE and NFC. The phone has 1 GB of RAM.

== Droid Razr Maxx HD ==
At the same time of launch, Motorola released a Maxx variant of the standard Droid Razr HD featuring a higher battery capacity and larger internal storage capacity. The Razr Maxx HD is equipped with a 3300 mAh Li-ion battery, a 30% increase in capacity over the 2530 mAh battery in the standard Razr HD. Due to the battery's larger physical size, the Razr Maxx HD's overall thickness increases by 0.9 mm over the standard variant at a total thickness of 9.3 mm. Additionally, the Droid Razr Maxx HD is only available with 32 GB internal storage, double the internal storage of the standard Razr HD's 16 GB.

The Droid Razr Maxx HD is only available with a black colored bezel for the display assembly.

To promote the Droid Razr Maxx HD, a Limited Edition was made available to Verizon employees only. The Limited Edition has a few cosmetic differences; these consist of a red colored power button, red and black colored weave for the backing with the words "LIMITED EDITION" printed on it, and an individually numbered rear camera window. In comparison, the consumer version has a gray colored power button that matches volume rocker color, gray and black colored weave for the backing, and no serial number on the rear camera window.

== Developer Edition ==
The Droid Razr HD Developer Edition went on sale direct through Motorola on October 18, 2012 featuring an unlocked bootloader allowing the ability to flash custom ROMs onto the phone, and also providing easy root access. This device is marketed primarily to the Verizon Wireless 4G LTE network users in the United States whose bootloaders cannot be unlocked through Motorola's unlocking program, or unlocked with scripts made to unlock them. The international (non-US) Motorola Razr HD UTMS/LTE variant sold in parts of Europe, Latin America, Australia and Canada can be, however.

The Droid Razr HD Developer Edition is only available with a black bezel color in the standard 2530 mAh battery configuration; there is no Droid Razr Maxx HD Developer Edition.
