= Trimphone =

1960s British telephone model

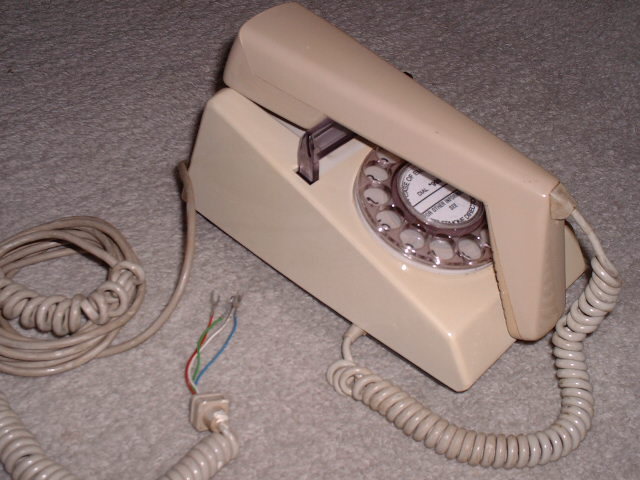
A Trimphone, viewed from the side. The handset cradle functioned as a carrying handle when the receiver was off the hook, and the coiled cord in theory allowed the phone to be carried around.

The Trimphone is a model of telephone designed in the early 1960s in the UK, the first prototypes appearing in 1965. It was positioned as a more fashionable alternative to the standard telephones available from the General Post Office (GPO), the nationalised predecessor to British Telecom. The name is an acronym standing for Tone Ring Illuminator Model, referring to the novel electronic ringer ("warbling", as opposed to the traditional bell) and the illuminated dial. The luminous dial or betalight contained the mildly radioactive element tritium, which later caused some concern about safety. In June 1991, the United Kingdom Atomic Energy Authority at Harwell was fined £3,000 by Wantage Magistrates Court for accumulating radioactive waste, having collected several thousand Trimphone luminous dials in a skip.

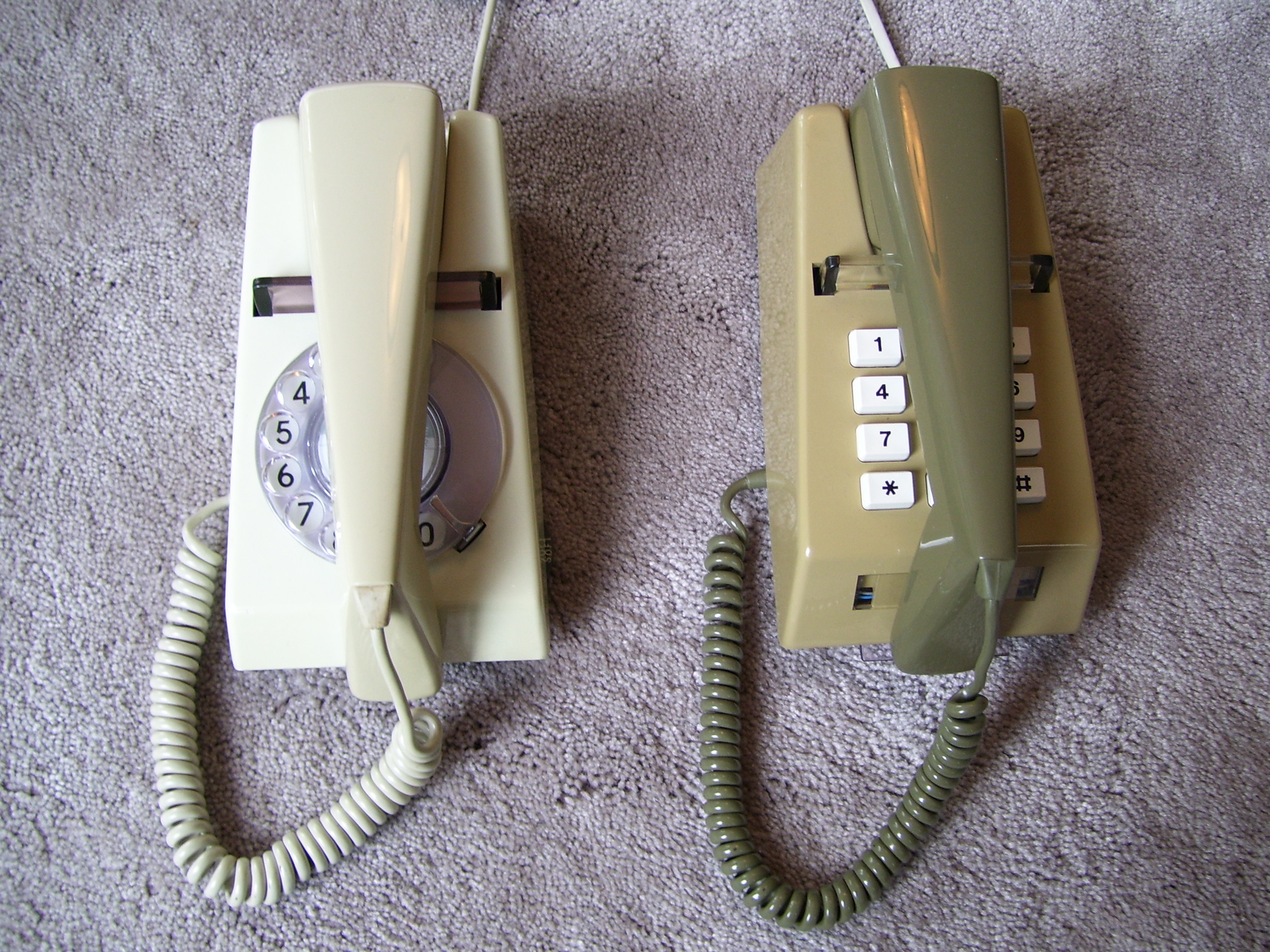
The Trimphone, from above, in the original dial design and the later keypad. To fit the electronics used to generate the dial pulses (and in later models, tones), the depth of the case was increased.

Although a later model featured buttons that did not light up instead of the original dial, it continued to be known as the Trimphone. Consumers were divided as to its aesthetic merits and some models required rewiring to connect to the public phone network in the UK.

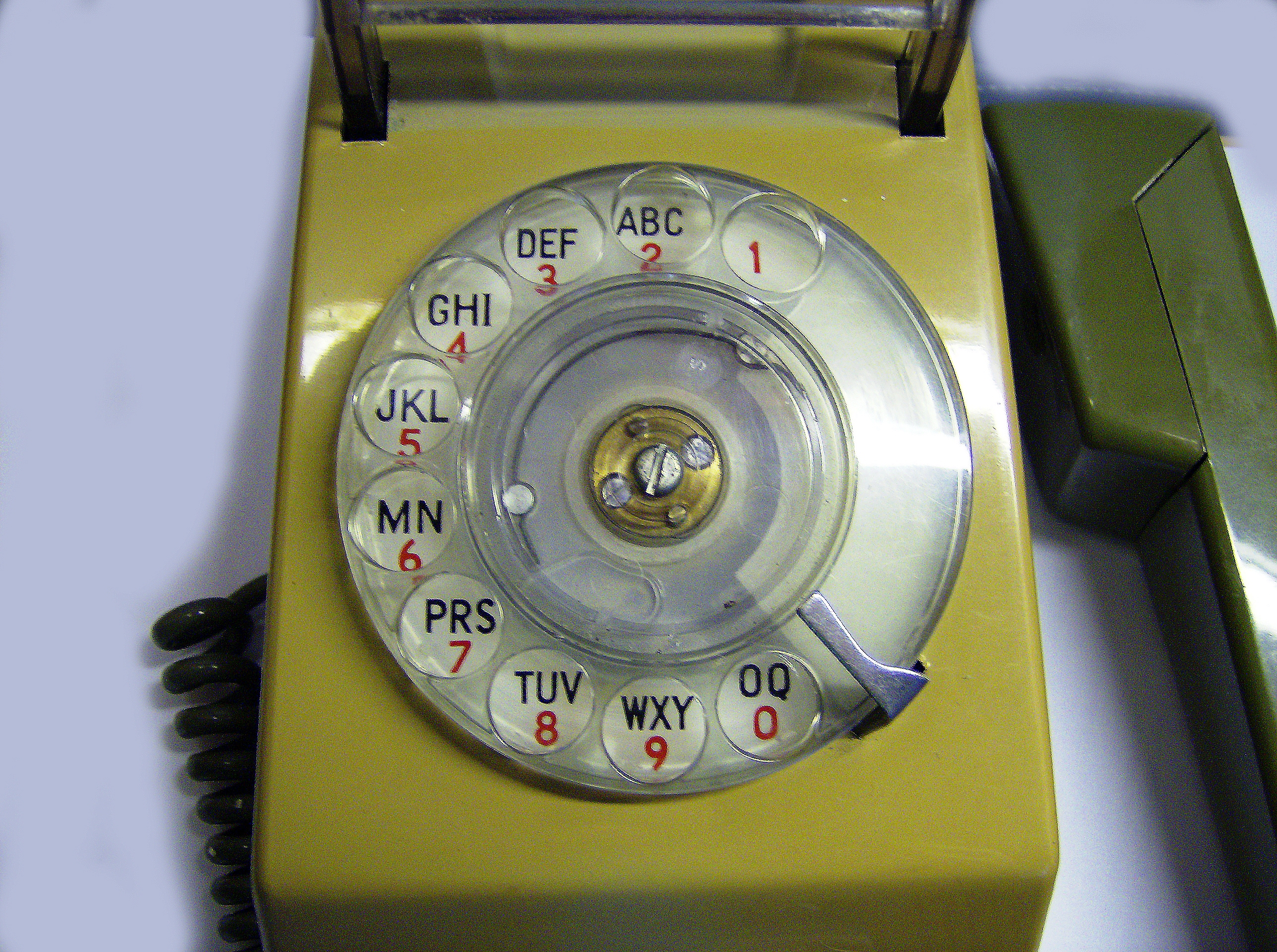
The Telephone No. 712 usually featured an alphabetical dial, which was also used on early versions of the 722.

The innovative design by Martyn Rowlands for Standard Telephones and Cables (STC), won a Design Centre award in 1966. It originated from an initial idea in 1959 for a luxury telephone to add to the Post Office's range. Towards the end of 1963 it chose this design although it considered others including a submission from GEC. In 1964 the GPO placed a contract for 10,000 units.

The Trimphone started life in 1964 as the Telephone No. 712, which was usually supplied as a 712L with an alphabetical as well as numerical dial. The Trimphone was the first in the GPO range to use a tone caller which warbled at around 2,350 Hz modulated by ringing current. The volume of the ringer gradually built up over the first few cycles. There is a volume control in the base of the telephone with 'loud', 'medium' and 'soft' settings (a silent setting was achieved by slackening off a screw on the tone ringer board inside the phone).

Production of the new telephone commenced in 1965 by STC, and an initial quantity of 1,000 was offered to customers on a selective trial basis in the London North West Telephone Area in the same year. It became available throughout the country in 1968, at extra rental cost, with a choice of three two-tone colour schemes: grey-white, grey-green and two-tone blue. The first example of the Trimphone was presented in May 1965 by the Postmaster General, Tony Benn, to a newlywed couple in Hampstead in a ceremony marking the ten millionth telephone to be installed in Britain. By 1980 there were 1.6 million Trimphones in use out of a total telephone population at that time of 27 million.

There was also some concern about the luminescent dial that glowed green in the dark. This effect came from a small glass tube of tritium gas, which gave off beta radiation, which in turn energized light-producing phosphors and made the dial fluoresce. Although the radioactivity was equivalent only to that given off by a wristwatch it was felt wise to withdraw this facility as public concern over radioactivity grew.

Another problem with the dial version of the Trimphone was its light weight, 0.8 kg (1.8 lb) compared with 1.4 kg (3.1 lb) for the 700-type and 2.6 kg (5.7 lb) for the 300-type telephone. This led to the complaint that on slippery surfaces the telephone turned and slid while dialling. The fix for this was to wet the feet and the phone stuck to the table.

After a number of different modifications, the definitive version of the Trimphone, the 2/722 was introduced in 1971. These were supplied with an all figure dial, although earlier variants of the 722 with lettered dials exist.

The first keypad version of the Trimphone appeared in 1977 – somewhat delayed by the problem of packaging the signalling electronics into the small volume of the Trimphone. The problem was alleviated by marginally increasing the height of the case compared to the dial version. The first design of keypad Trimphone to achieve large-scale production was the SC version (Tele 766); this design incorporates relays, but does not require batteries. Subsequent designs eased the packaging problems further by eliminating the relays and introducing transistor pulsing. An MF4 (Touch-tone) design had to await the development of an integrated circuit to replace the bulky coils and capacitors otherwise needed. This was introduced in 1979 (Tele 786).

The next incarnation of the Trimphone was the Deltaphone, a deluxe version of the Trimphone with a case bound in leather. By 1980, Trimphones had been around for some 15 years and needed revamping for the new era of competition. The final incarnation (or rather reincarnation) was a collection of alternative colour range Trimphones called the Phoenix phone or 'Snowdon Collection'. BT, as the GPO had become, fitted these with the new plug-socket connection and they were available for purchase.

Various rotary dial 722 Trimphones:

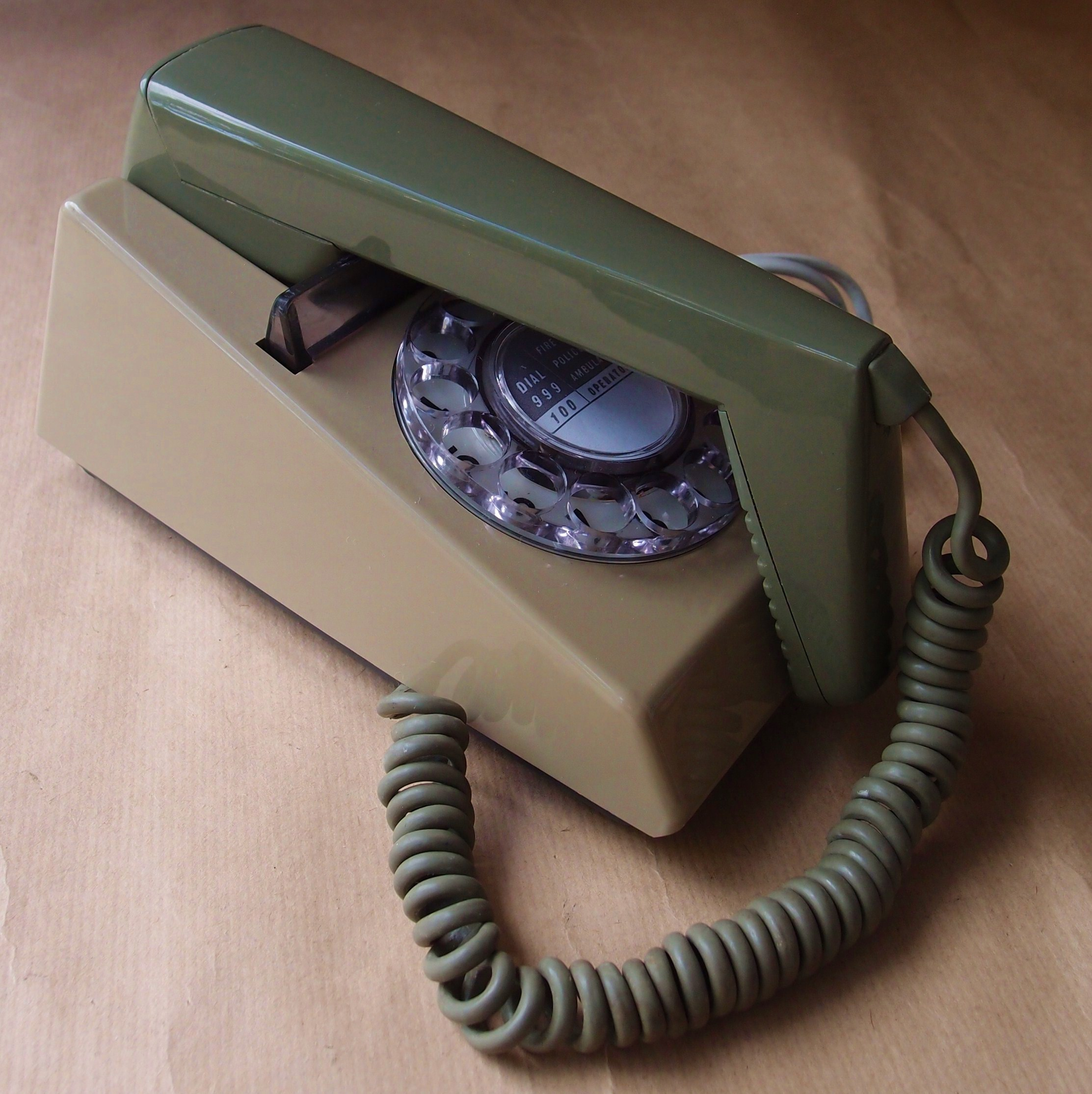
1969 1/722F MOD grey & green rotary dial Trimphone telephone

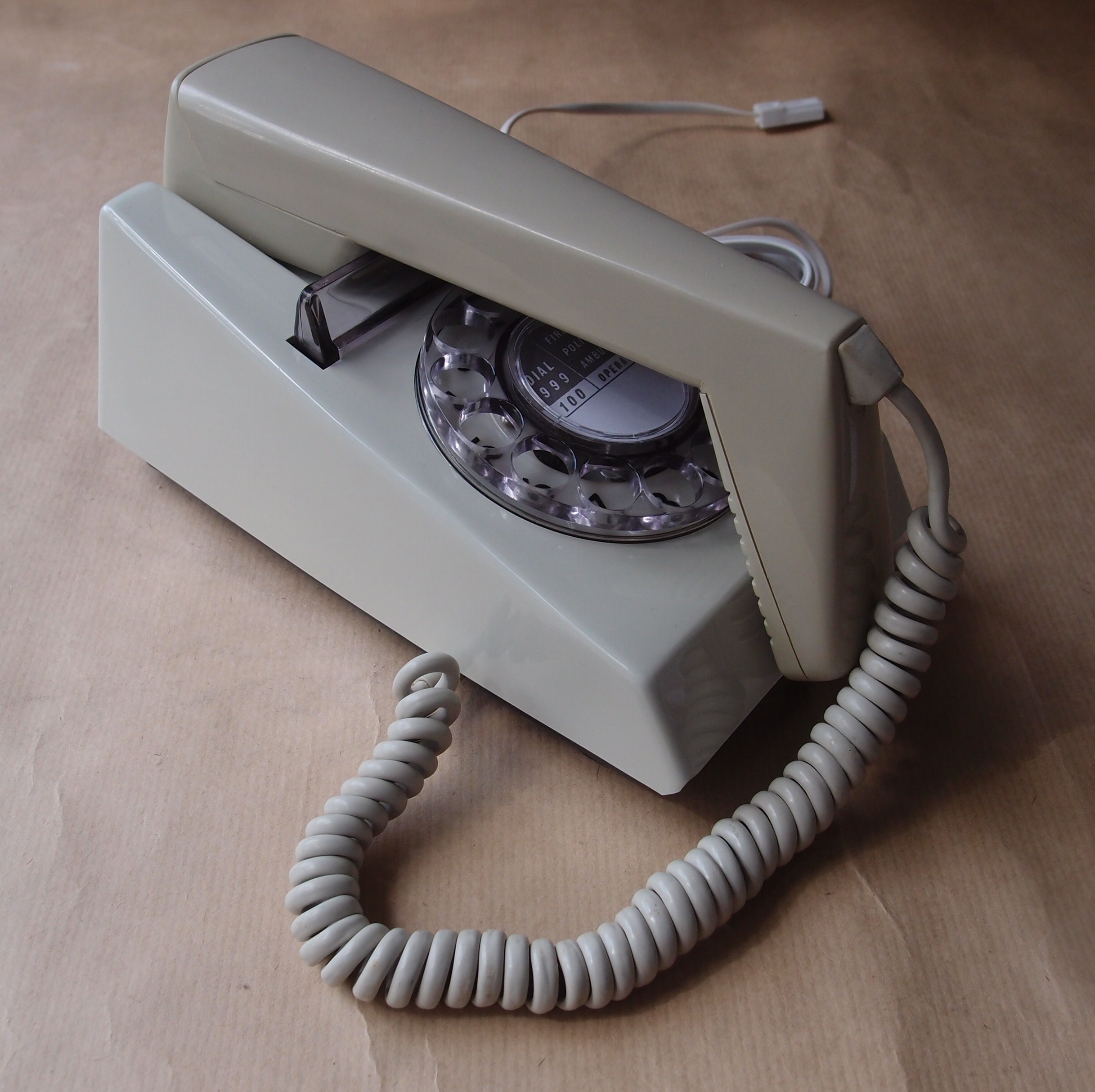
1971 1/722F grey & white rotary dial Trimphone telephone

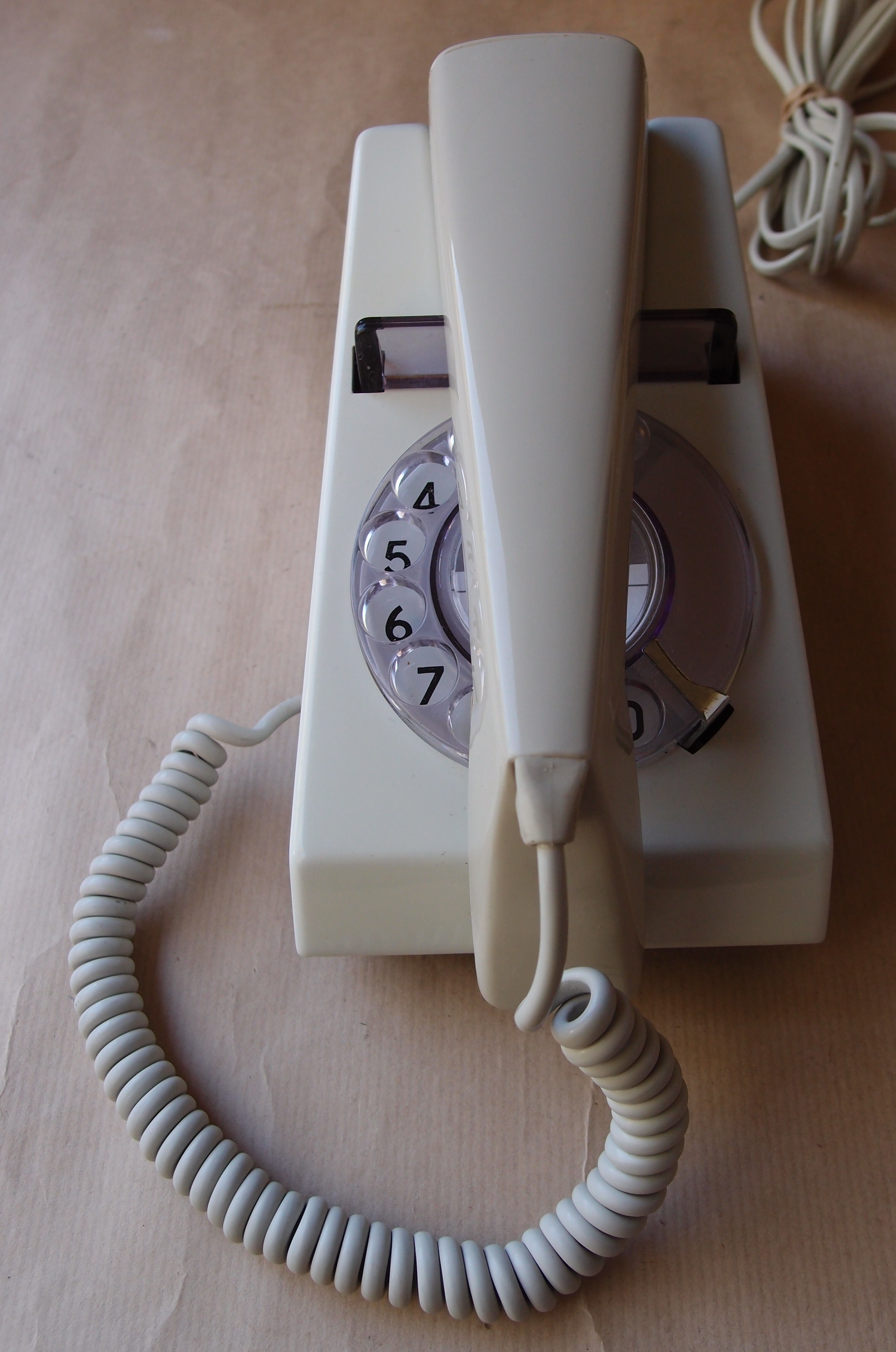
1971 2/722F grey & white Trimphone telephone - one of the first of this type

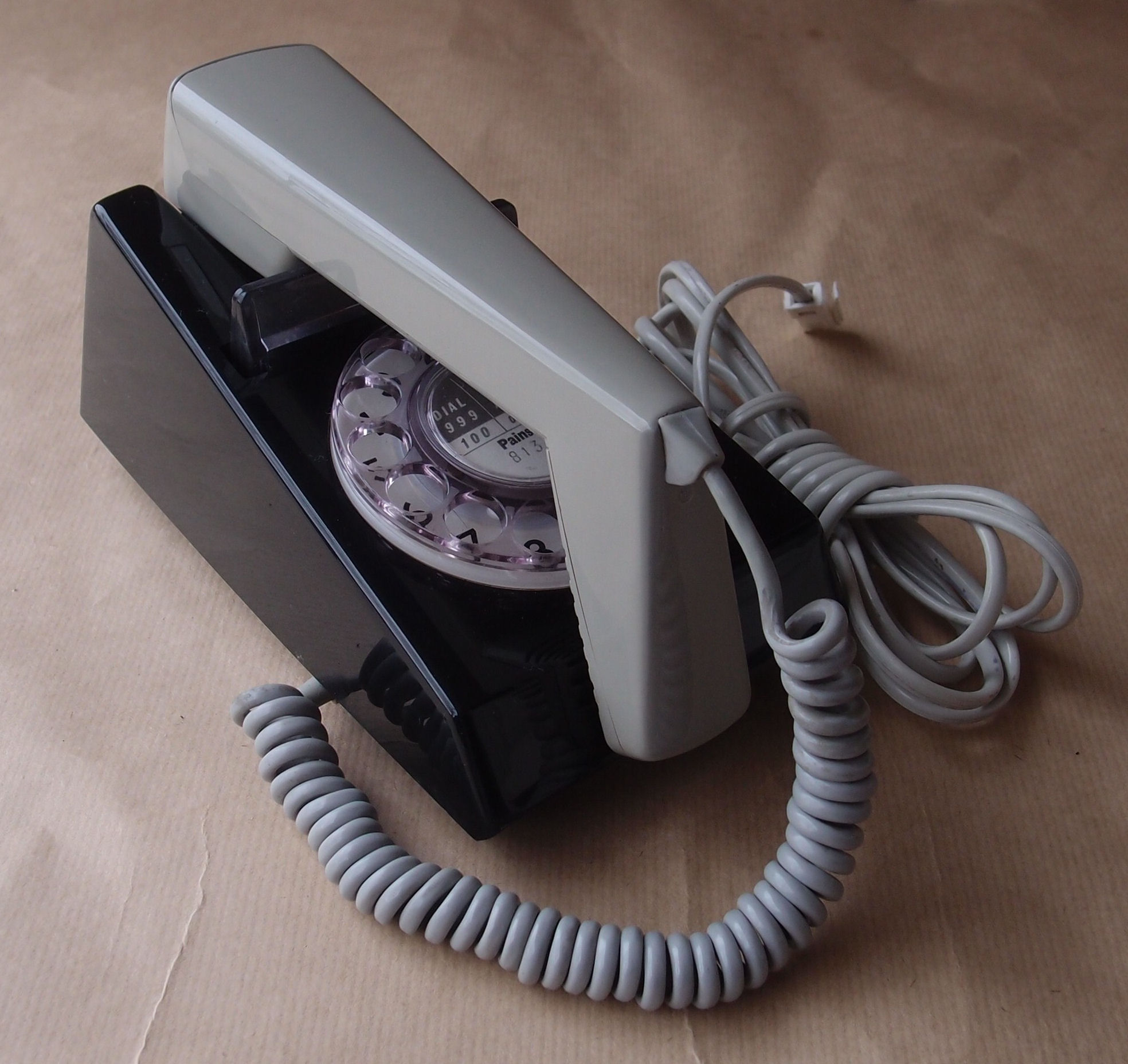
1982 8722G Snowdon Collection black & grey rotary dial Trimphone telephone

Images of various push button 766 Trimphones:

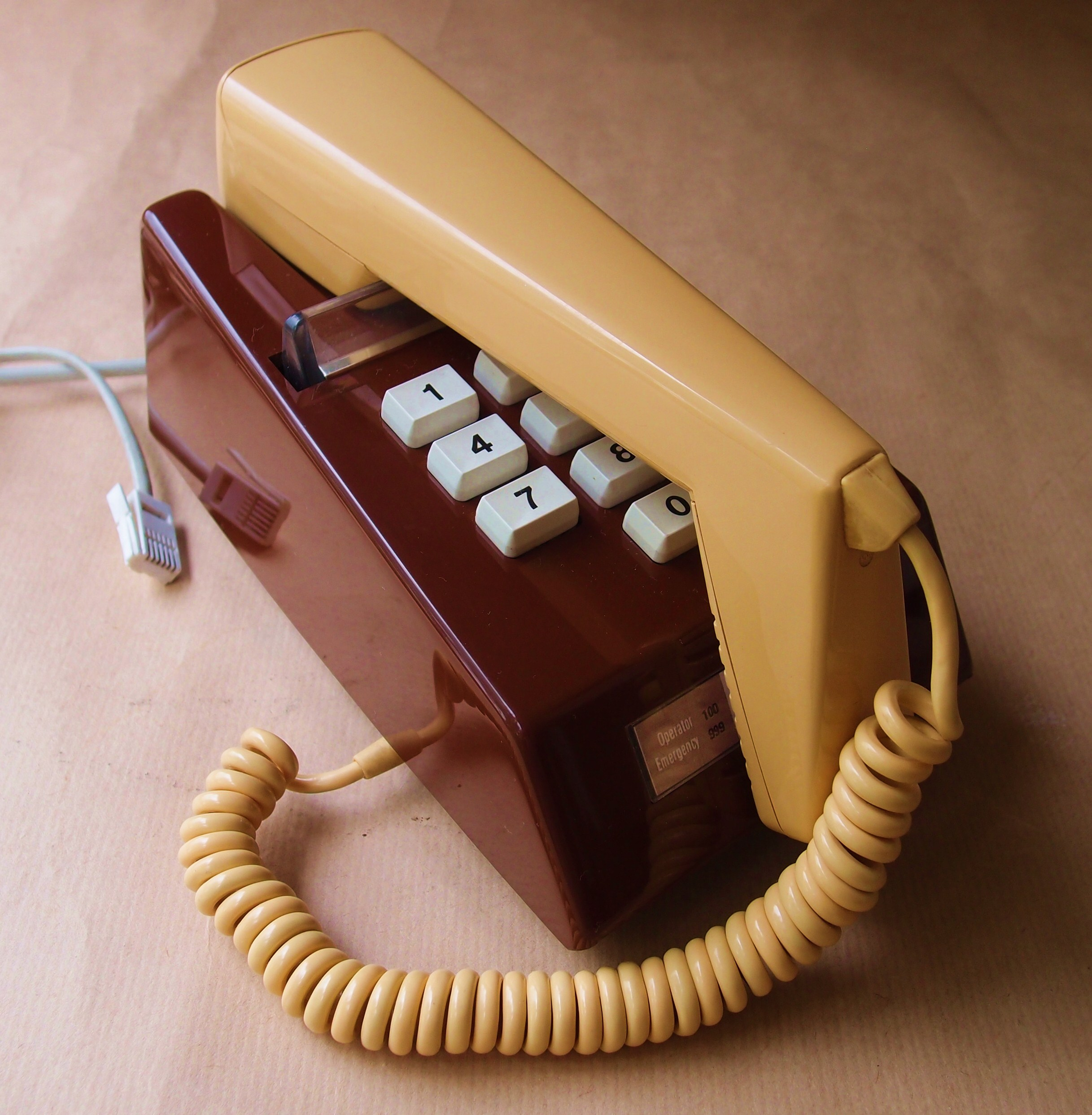
1982 8766 Snowdon Collection push button Trimphone in brown & cream

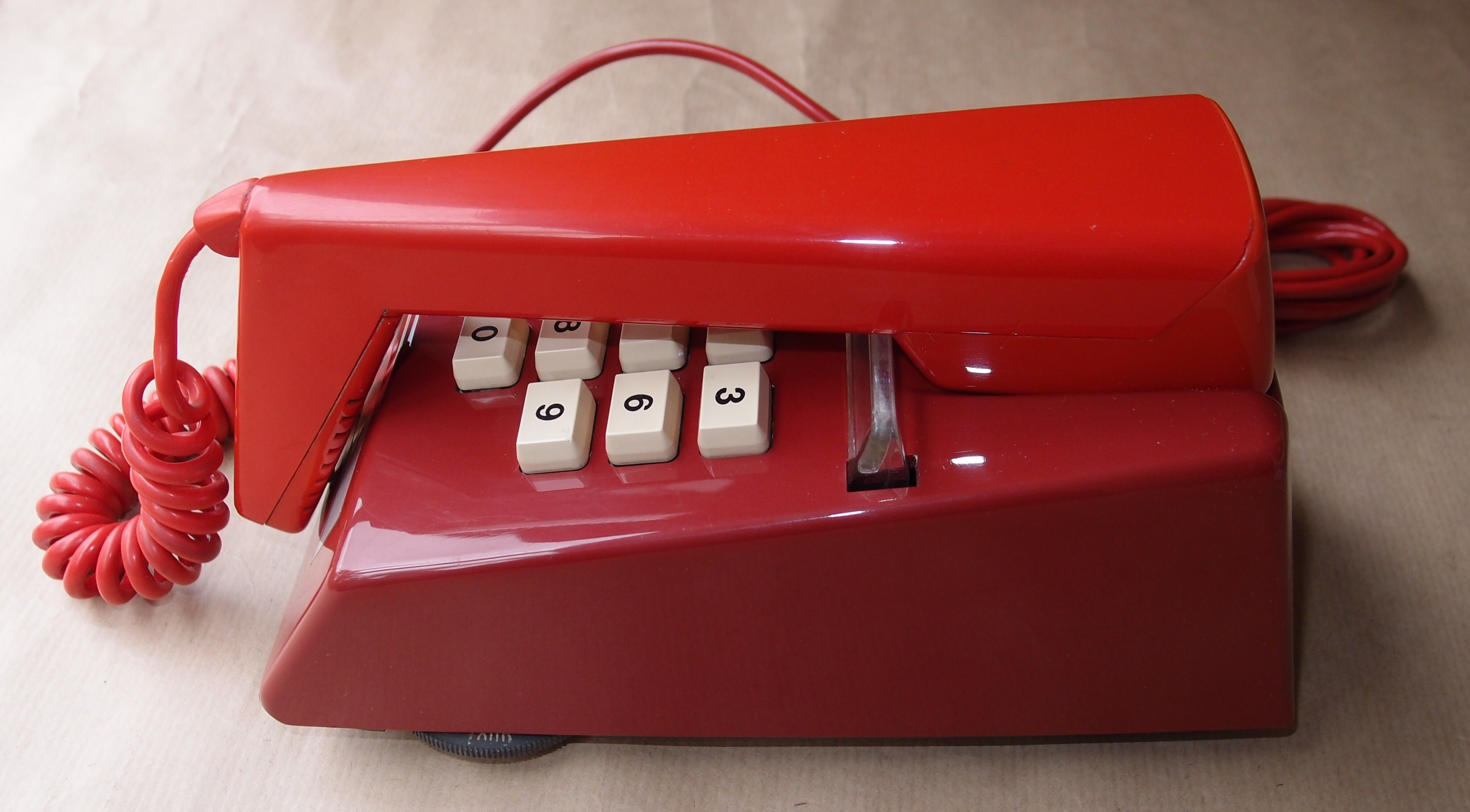
1982 8766 Snowdon Collection push button Trimphone in two tone red

== See also ==
- Ericofon – A Swedish telephone that was similarly fashionable in its day.
- Grillo – Another innovative telephone, from Italy. Its design anticipated the cellular "flip phone".
- Trimline – The Trimline telephone from the United States incorporated a dial into the handset, but still had a separate cradle containing the ringer.
- GPO Telephones – UK telephone monopoly (until 1982).
