= Motorola Razr =

Series of mobile phones by Motorola Mobility

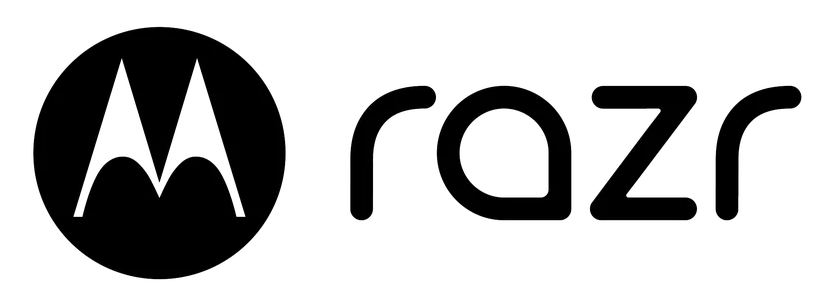
- Current logo

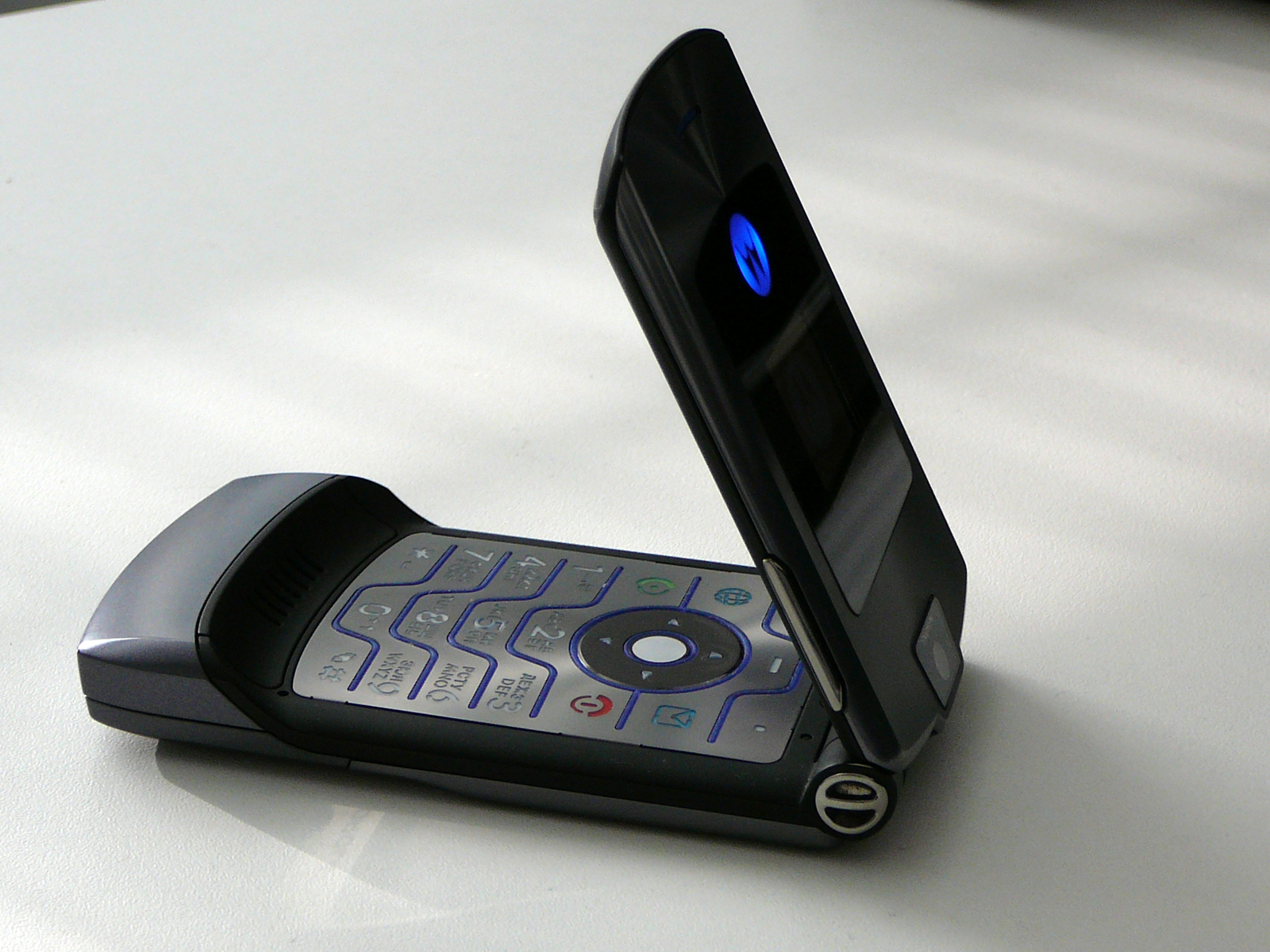
- The Razr V3i was sold during the height of the popularity of the Razr series.
- Developer: Motorola (2004–2011), Motorola Mobility (2011–present)
- Type: Mobile phone
- Released: Motorola Razr V3: 2004; 22 years ago Motorola Razr2: 2007; 19 years ago Motorola Droid Razr: 2011; 15 years ago Motorola Razr: 2020; 6 years ago
- Lifespan: 2004–2015, 2019–present
- Operating system: Various
- Predecessor: Motorola StarTAC; Motorola V series
- Related: Motorola KRZR, Motorola PEBL, Motorola Moto

The Motorola Razr (pronounced /ˈreɪzər/ like "razor"), also stylized motorola razr, is a brand of mobile devices manufactured by Motorola Mobility (previously Motorola, now a division of Lenovo), currently consisting of foldable smartphones.

The Razr name was introduced with the V3 model (then styled RAZR or MOTORAZR) in 2004, which became extremely popular. The line was succeeded by the Motorola Razr2 flip phones in 2007. The Razr later evolved into a line of non-clamshell devices in 2011, Droid Razr (known simply as the "Motorola RAZR" on non-Verizon networks), bearing design similarities to the originals. Razr was revived again in 2019, this time evolving into a line of all-screen clamshell foldables that continues to this day.

== First generation - Razr V3 (2004-2007) ==
MOTORAZR logo used for the first RAZR series

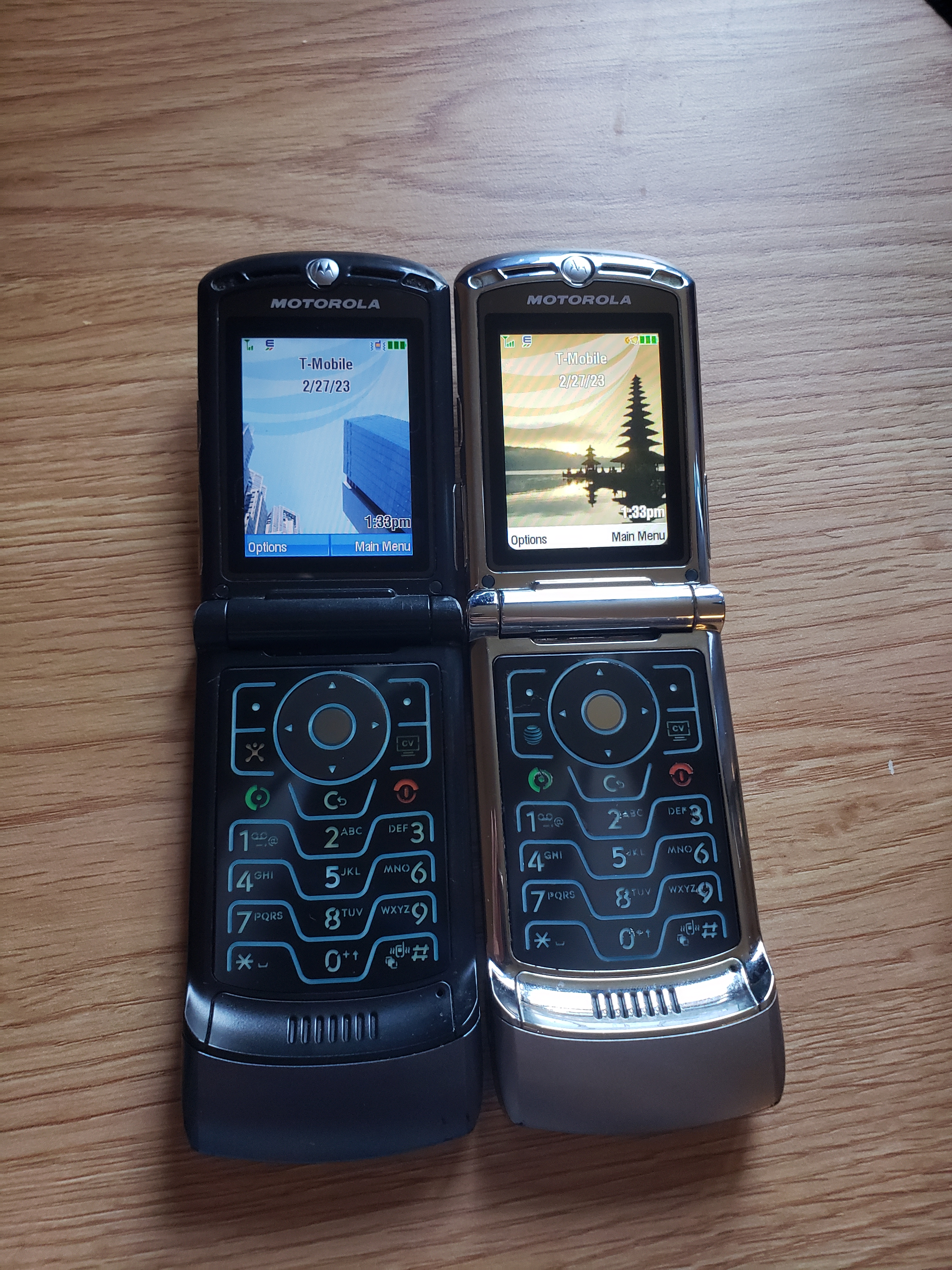
Two RAZR V3xx phones (2006)

The Razr V3 was introduced in 2004 and became wildly popular. Motorola released several upgraded versions, including the Razr V3x in 2005 (which featured 3G connectivity), the Razr V3i, and the Razr v3xx in 2006, along with various variants. Motorola also released the Motorola RAZR maxx V6.

== Second generation - Razr2 (2007-2009) ==
The Razr2 was the successor to the Razr series. The Razr2 was 2 mm thinner than its predecessor but slightly wider. Some versions featured Motorola's MotoMagx operational platform, based on the MontaVista Linux OS. The Razr2 was available on every US carrier, and EVDO, GSM, and HSDPA versions were released by late 2007. The Razr2 line consisted of 4 models: V8, V9, V9m, and V9x.

The phone improved picture quality, speed, and multimedia capabilities over the original Razr. It also featured an external screen with touch-sensitive buttons, which allowed users to use some of the phone's features without opening it, and Motorola's CrystalTalk technology to improve call quality and help reduce background noise. Different color variants were released, including a Luxury Edition and a Ferrari Edition.

However, Razr2 sales were not as strong as those of the original V3 series, as consumers moved to competing products. Because Motorola relied so long upon the Razr and its derivatives and was slow to develop new products in the growing market for feature-rich touchscreen and 3G phones, the Razr appeal declined, leading Motorola to drop behind Samsung eventually and LG in market share for mobile phones. Motorola's strategy of grabbing market share by selling tens of millions of low-cost Razrs cut into margins and resulted in heavy losses in the cellular division. The cell phone division became part of Motorola Mobility in 2011 as a result of the Motorola split.

== Third generation - Droid Razr (2011-2013) ==
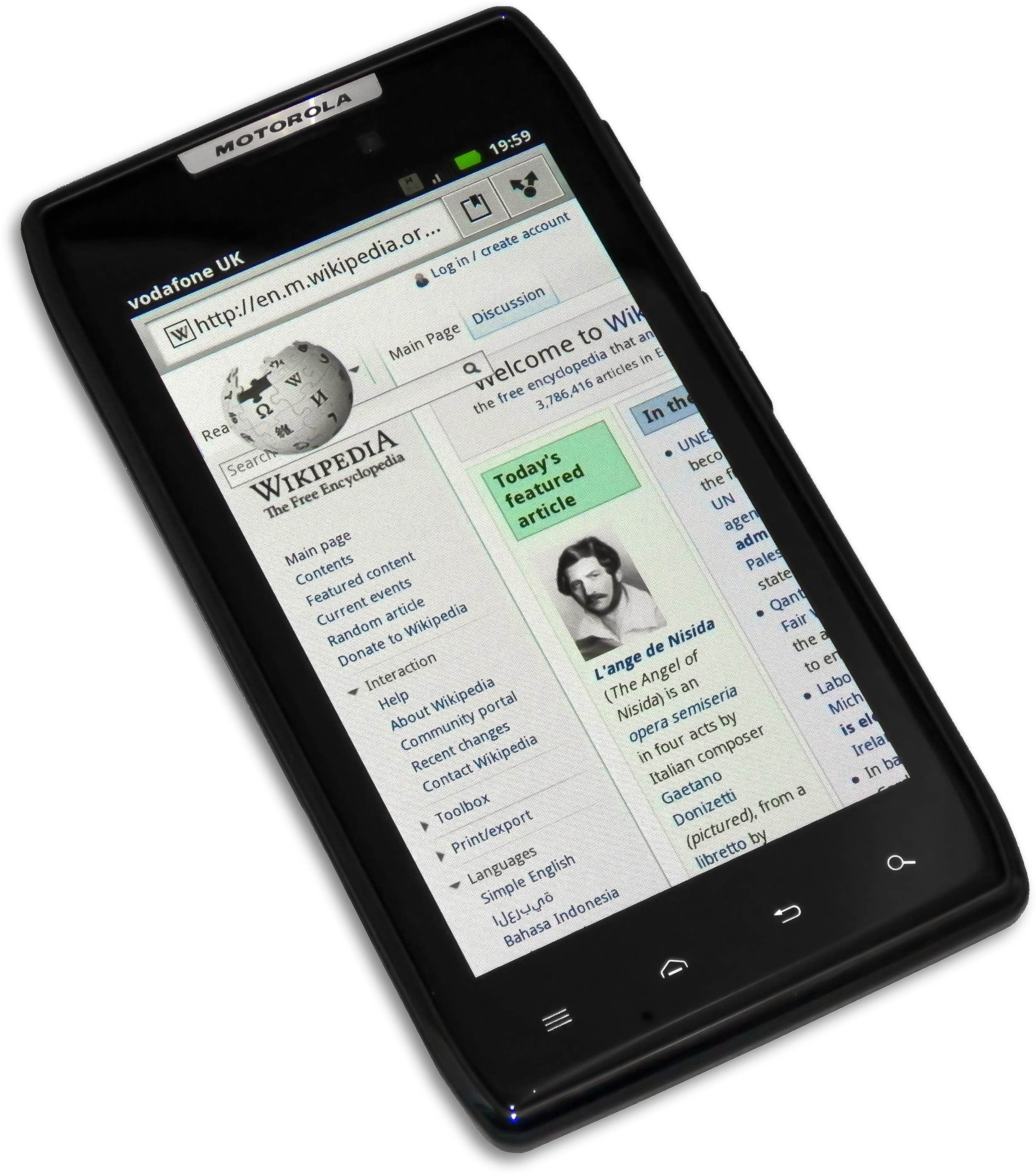
Motorola RAZR (XT910)

The Razr brand returned in 2011 with the introduction of the Motorola Droid Razr smartphone (the "Droid" name only used by Verizon in the USA). The line shared its trademark thinness and stylized tapered corners with the original. The line included:

- Droid Razr, flagship successor of the Droid Bionic
  - Droid Razr Maxx, variant with a larger battery
- Motorola Razr V, a cheaper Droid Razr released in Canada
- Droid Razr HD, new flagship introduced in 2012
  - Droid Razr Maxx HD, variant with a larger battery
- Droid Razr M, same internals as Droid Razr HD but in a smaller body
  - Motorola RAZR i, variant with an Intel Atom-powered chip and no 4G
- Motorola Razr D1 and D3, entry-level products released in Brazil in 2013

The Droid Razr HD and Droid Razr M were succeeded by the Droid MAXX and Droid Mini, respectively.

== Fourth generation - Razr foldable smartphones (2019-present) ==
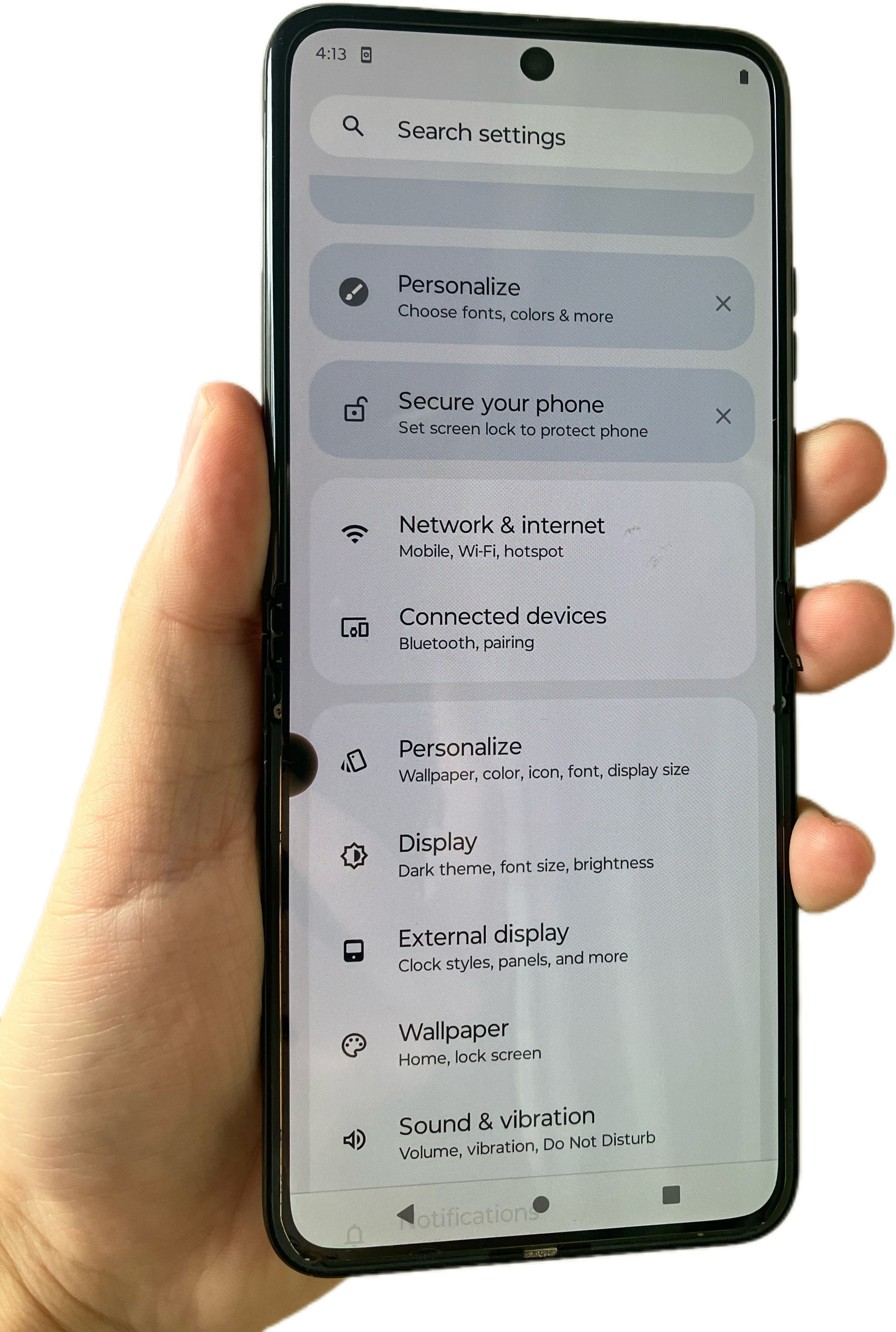
Motorola Razr 40 / Razr (2023)

The Razr was revived again in 2020 with the release of the Razr foldable smartphone (flip phone) with a flexible folding interior display, styled after the clamshell form factor of the original models. Announced in November 2019, the new Razr has a design reminiscent of the classic Razr V3. A full successor did not come out until 2022 and since then Motorola has annually updated this series of new Razr foldables. The line includes:

=== Clamshell-style foldables ===
| Generation | Announced | Model name | Model name in the US and Canada | Exterior material/finish | Exterior display |
|---|---|---|---|---|---|
| Razr 2020 | November 2019 | Motorola Razr (2020) | | Glass and aluminium | 2.7" AMOLED |
| Razr 2020 | September 2020 | Motorola Razr 5G | | Glass and aluminium | 2.7" AMOLED |
| Razr 2022 | August 2022 | Motorola Razr (2022) | | Glass and aluminium | 2.7" AMOLED |
| Razr 40 | June 2023 | Motorola Razr 40 | Motorola Razr | Synthetic leather and aluminum | 1.5" AMOLED |
| Razr 40 | June 2023 | Motorola Razr 40 Ultra | Motorola Razr+ | Glass or synthetic leather | 3.6" pOLED |
| Razr 50 | June 2024 | Motorola Razr 50 | Motorola Razr 2024 | Synthetic leather and aluminum | 3.6" pOLED |
| Razr 50 | June 2024 | Motorola Razr 50 Ultra | Motorola Razr+ 2024 | Synthetic leather and aluminum | 4.0" LTPO flexible AMOLED |
| Razr 60 | April 2025 | Motorola Razr 60 | Motorola Razr 2025 | Matte plastic and aluminum | 3.6" pOLED |
| Razr 60 | April 2025 | Motorola Razr 60 Plus | Motorola Razr Plus 2025 | Textured plastic and aluminum | 3.6" pOLED |
| Razr 60 | April 2025 | Motorola Razr 60 Ultra | Motorola Razr Ultra 2025 | Synthetic microfiber and aluminum | 4.0" LTPO flexible AMOLED |
| Razr 70 | April 2026 | Motorola Razr 70 | Motorola Razr 2026 | Ceramic-coated glass and aluminum | 3.8" pOLED |
| Razr 70 | April 2026 | Motorola Razr 70 Plus | Motorola Razr Plus 2026 | Synthetic leather and aluminum | 3.8" pOLED |
| Razr 70 | April 2026 | Motorola Razr 70 Ultra | Motorola Razr Ultra 2026 | Wood or synthetic microfiber | 4.0" LTPO flexible AMOLED |

=== Book-style foldables ===
In March 2026, the Motorola Razr Fold was announced, which marked Motorola's first book-style foldable rather than clamshell-style foldable as the rest of the Razr line.

== See also ==
- Motorola StarTAC
- Samsung Galaxy Z series
- Star Trek Communicator (1964)
- Grillo telephone (1965)
