= Droid Razr =

Android smartphone developed by Motorola Mobility

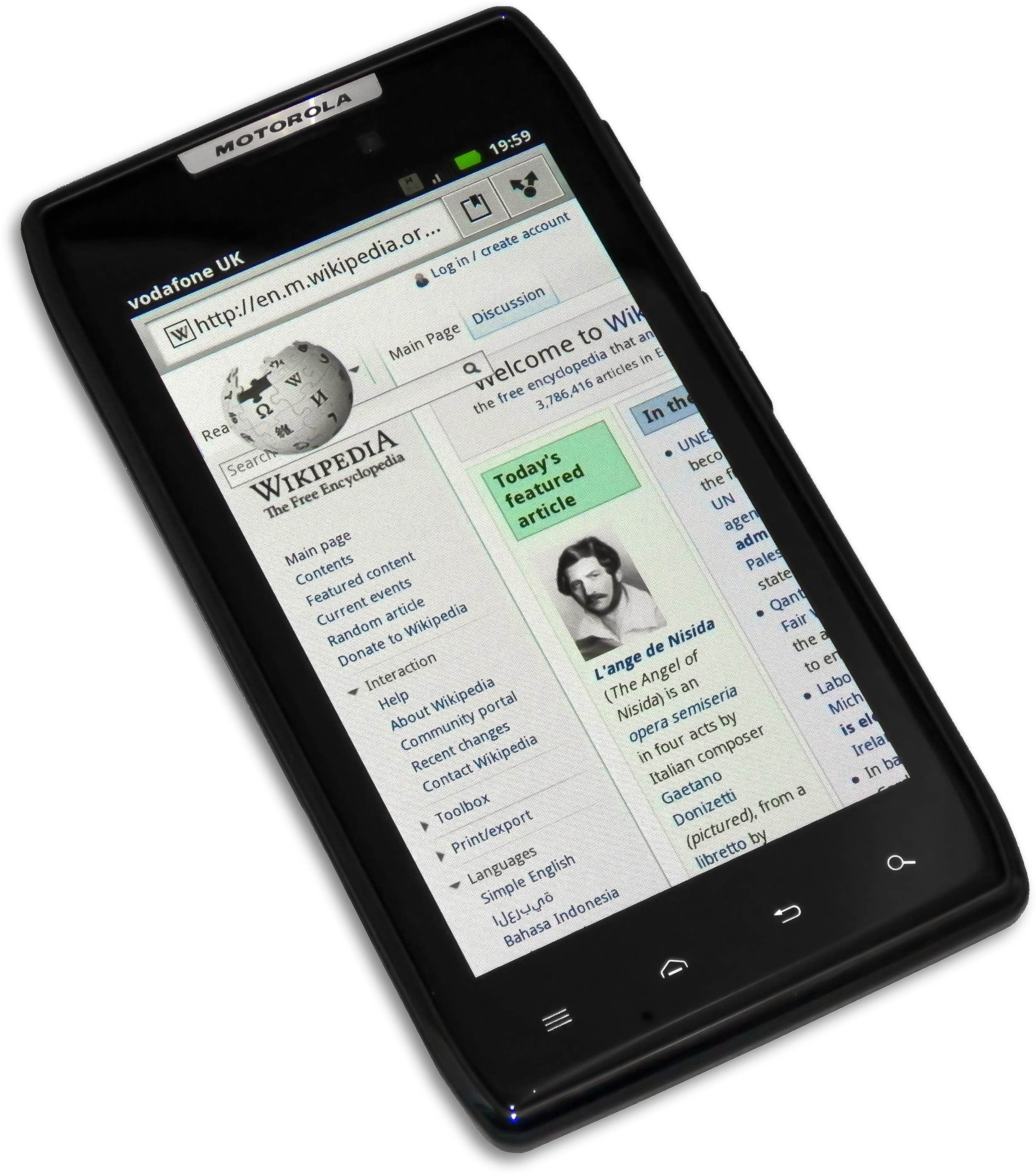
- Motorola Droid RAZR
- Brand: Motorola
- Manufacturer: Motorola
- Type: Smartphone
- Series: Motorola Razr, Droid
- First released: November 11, 2011; 14 years ago
- Predecessor: Motorola DROID BIONIC
- Successor: Droid Razr HD
- Related: Droid Razr M Droid Razr i Droid Razr HD; Droid 4
- Compatible networks: Droid Razr/Razr Maxx: dual-band CDMA2000; EV-DO Rev. A 800 1900 MHz; LTE 750 MHz quad-band GSM, UMTS 850 900 1900 2100 MHz Razr/Razr Maxx: quad-band GSM, UMTS 850 900 1900 2100 MHz
- Form factor: Slate
- Dimensions: 130.7 mm (5.15 in) H 68.9 mm (2.71 in) W 7.1 mm (0.28 in) D (MAXX: 8.99 mm (0.354 in) D)
- Weight: 127 g (4.5 oz) (MAXX: 145 g (5.1 oz) )
- Operating system: Release: 2.3.5 Gingerbread; Current: 4.0.4 Ice Cream Sandwich; 4.1.2 Jelly Bean
- System-on-chip: TI OMAP4430
- CPU: 1.2 GHz dual-core ARM Cortex-A9
- GPU: PowerVR SGX 540 @ 300 MHz
- Memory: 1 GB RAM
- Storage: 16 GB Flash (8 ROM / 8 Internal Storage)
- Removable storage: microSD comes with 16 GB card; Supports up to 64 GB SDXC
- Battery: 1,780 mAh; 3,300 mAh (Droid Razr Maxx) Internal rechargeable li-ion
- Rear camera: 8 MP still, 1080p video
- Front camera: 1.3 MP with 720p HD video capture
- Display: Super AMOLED Advanced PenTile 4.3 inch 540×960 px qHD at 256 ppi
- Connectivity: Wi-Fi 802.11a/b/g/n Bluetooth 4.0; 4G Mobile Hotspot aGPS (assisted) eCompass sGPS (simultaneous) GLONASS
- Codename: Spyder
- SAR: Head: 1.45 W/kg; Body: 0.71 W/kg
- Other: Talk Time: Up to 21.5 hours Standby Time: Up to approx. 15.8 days (Razr Maxx)

The Verizon Droid Razr (GSM/UMTS version: Motorola Razr; both versions styled RAZR) is an Android-based, 4G LTE-capable smartphone designed by Motorola that launched on Verizon Wireless on November 11, 2011. It was announced on October 18, 2011 in New York City.

At launch, the Razr was the thinnest smartphone in the world at only 7.1 mm thick on most of the device (it does, however, have a "bump" on top that is approximately 11.1 mm thick.) and includes a 4.3-inch (110 mm) super active-matrix organic light emitting diode (AMOLED) advanced PenTile display, covered in a Gorilla glass screen and a Kevlar back plate. It is powered by an OMAP 4430 SoC with dual 1.2 GHz ARM Cortex-A9 processor cores. Its 8-megapixel rear-facing camera can record 1080p HD videos. It comes with 1 GB of RAM and runs Android version 4.1.2. The Razr Maxx is a variant with a higher capacity battery at 3300 mAh an 85% increase in capacity over the 1780 mAh battery in the original RAZR. Due to the battery's larger physical size, the Razr Maxx's overall thickness is larger, at 9 mm.

The Razr's successor, the Droid Razr HD, was announced on 5 September 2012.

== Availability ==
The phone was launched in the United States on November 11, 2011, at 11:11 am.

The GSM/UMTS version was launched in India on 21 November 2011 at an MRP of ₹35,000. Motorola also stated a best buy price in selected retail stores of ₹33,990 for Razr XT910.

In Australia, Motorola launched it with the network operator Optus in Sydney, on 27 October 2011, though not the 4G LTE variant.

In Europe it was launched first in Bulgaria, debuting on December 12, 2011 from VIVACOM.

=== Japanese models ===
The IS12M was released on March 1, 2012, following its announcement on January 16, 2012. It is part of the IS series from KDDI and Okinawa Cellular Telephone, operating under the au brand, and supports CDMA 1X WIN. Its manufacturing model number is MOI12, and its manufacturer model number is XT909.

== Hardware ==
Motorola Droid Razr comes in the form factor of a slate with a diamond-cut aluminum chassis. The display is a 4.3 inch qHD (540 × 960) Super AMOLED Advanced PenTile[2] capacitive touchscreen that is covered by scratch-resistant Corning Gorilla Glass with an oleophobic fingerprint-resistant coating.

The back cover is made with DuPont Kevlar fiber surrounded by a plastic structure. The internals of the Droid RAZR are packed the smartphone construction technique Component Lamination, which physically bonds each layer of components to each other to provide a stronger body. The whole phone is covered by an invisible layer of splash-proof nano coating, which makes the phone water-resistant to occasional liquid splashes.

The Droid Razr features four touch-capacitive buttons with the respective functions of menu, home, back and search. It uses a dual microphone system for noise reduction.

A glitch where the time of the phone resets when it powers off had been observed in about two thousand phones worldwide.

== Software ==
The phone comes installed with Android version 2.3.5 Gingerbread. It uses a modified user interface called Motoblur that focuses on social networking. The main features of Motoblur in the Droid Razr are:

- Unified contacts. The contacts from all services are unified and duplicates are removed. This is often a source of errors as it has troubles distinguishing between unique contacts and copies.
- Google apps. By default all the Google Apps present in the Stock Android are included, with a modified UI and with Motorola services embedded.
- Smartactions. A Motorola app designed to automate tasks based on a wide range of triggers such as; time, location, battery charge, Wi-Fi network, etc.
- Webtop

The Droid Razr is upgradeable to version 4.1.2 Jelly Bean. The release of the update began on March 8, 2013 for Verizon Wireless Users. The official Over the Air (OTA) update was released soon after.

The Droid Razr had official support from the LineageOS project, the latest available version being 14.1, which is based on Android 7.1.2.

== Webtop ==
Similar to the Motorola Atrix 4G, it has the integrated "Webtop" application from Motorola. The Webtop application is launched when the phone is connected to the external display through the Laptop dock or HD multimedia dock. In Webtop mode, offering a similar user interface of a typical Ubuntu desktop, the phone can run several applications on an external display such as the Firefox web browser, SNS clients and 'mobile view' applications enabling total access of Atrix and its screen. In September 2011, Motorola released the source code of the Webtop application at SourceForge.

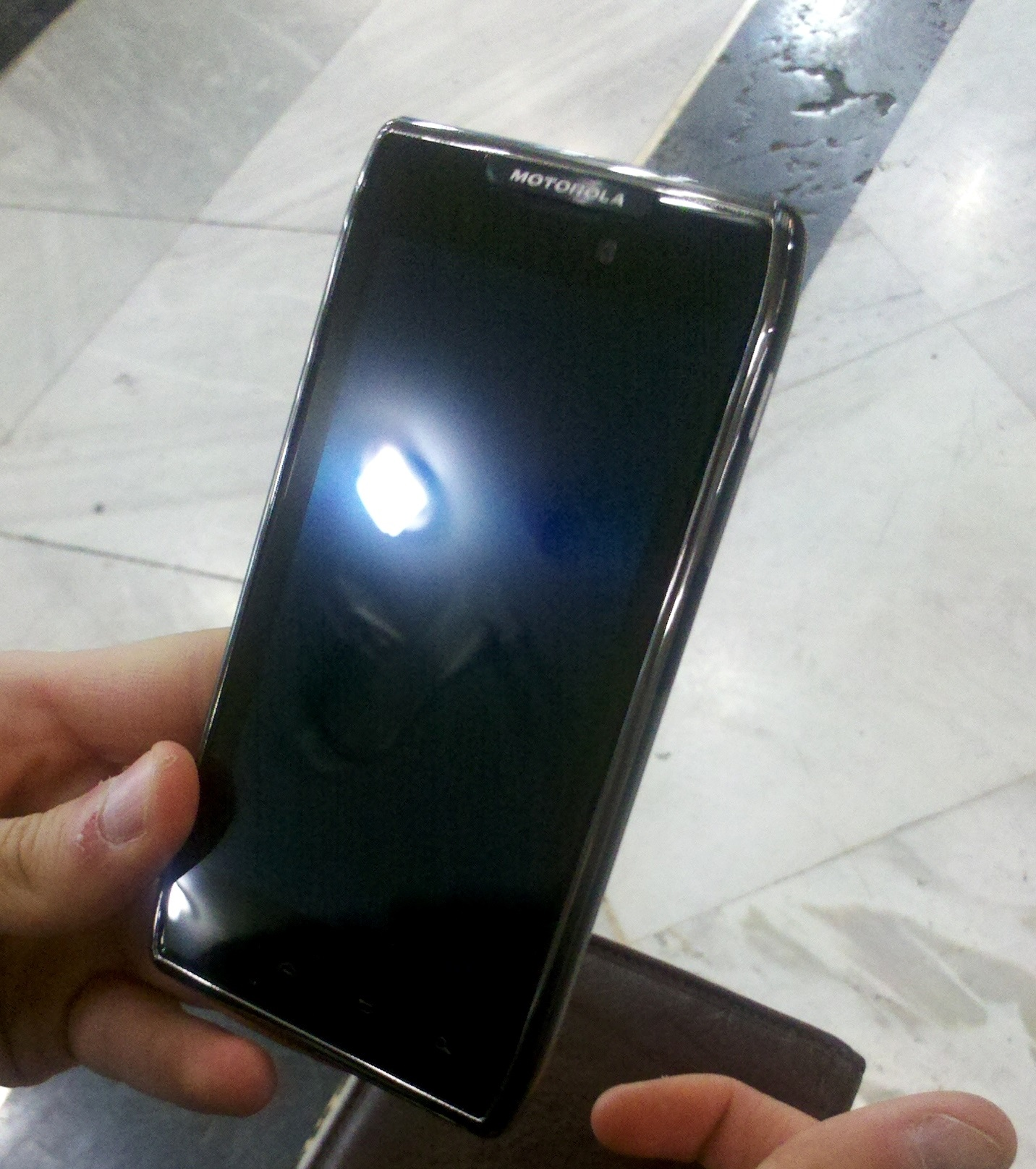
Motorola Droid Razr Maxx

=== Webtop 3.0 ===
With the Ice Cream Sandwich upgrade, Webtop is now called Webtop 3.0 and no longer consists of a separate Linux OS. Instead, when the phone is connected to an external monitor via HDMI (Laptop dock or multimedia dock is no longer required) and Webtop is chosen, the phone switches to the tablet UI in ICS and is able to run all the existing applications on the phone.

== Successors ==
=== Razr V ===
The Razr V is considered a generational upgrade of the original Droid Razr. The Razr V has improvements over the original such as Android 4.0 Ice Cream Sandwich and an easier to grasp form-factor, but there are also some cost-cutting measures in order to reduce the price, since the original Droid Razr was positioned as a flagship smartphone. In Canada, the Razr V launched on Bell Mobility and Virgin Mobile and Wind Mobile. However, the Razr V is still priced above that of a feature phone and it is not much cheaper than flagship (high-end) smartphones with better specs, such as Motorola's own Razr M and Razr HD.

=== Motorola Razr M and Motorola Razr i ===
See Motorola Razr M
See Motorola Razr i

=== Droid Razr HD and Droid Razr Maxx HD ===
See Droid Razr HD

== Unlocked bootloader ==
There is a Droid Razr variant that features the same characteristics as the Droid Razr with the difference of having an unlockable bootloader. All Razrs now can be unlocked, provided they are not the old OMAP processor. This device, the Motorola RAZR developer edition, is currently sold in Europe.

The developer edition features the capability of unlocking its bootloader by a tool found in the Motorola Mobility website. An unlocked bootloader gives developers the ability to load a custom operating system onto the phone without the need to use alternative bypasses such as Safestrap, it also provides easy root access without the need to use specific root exploits such as the Verizon variant (XT912) and the international variant (XT910).

== See also ==
- Droid 4
- Motorola Xyboard
- Google Nexus
- Galaxy Nexus
