= Droid Razr M =

Android smartphone developed by Motorola Mobility

Motorola Razr M/XT905/XT906/XT907
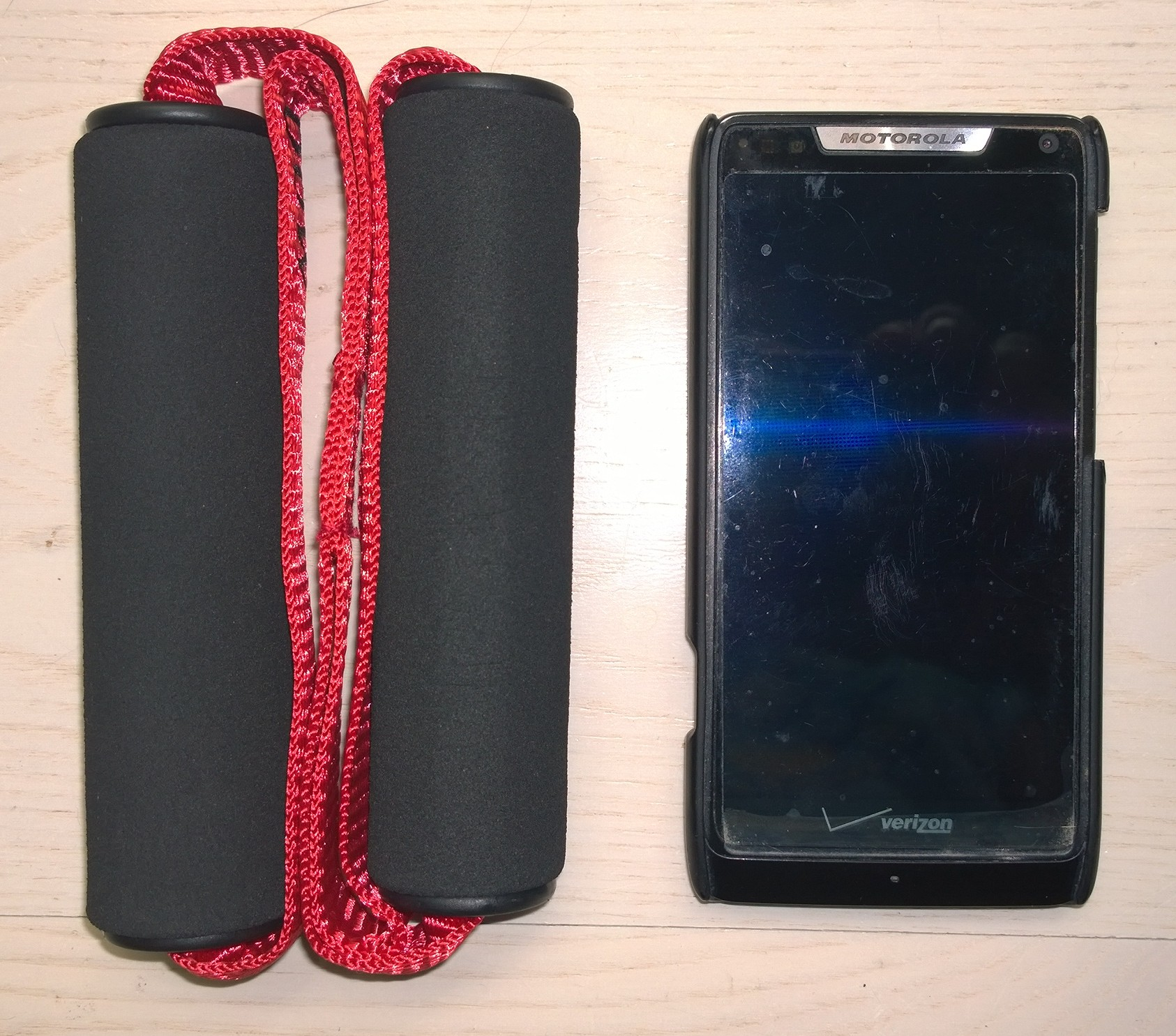
- Brand: Droid Razr
- Manufacturer: Motorola Mobility
- Type: Smartphone
- Series: Motorola Razr; Droid
- Predecessor: Droid Razr
- Successor: Droid Mini
- Related: Droid Razr HD
- Compatible networks: 3G UMTS/HSPA+ 4G LTE
- Form factor: Slate
- Dimensions: 122.5 mm (4.82 in) H 60.9 mm (2.40 in) W 8.3 mm (0.33 in) D
- Weight: 4.44 oz (126 g)
- Operating system: Android 4.1 Jelly Bean
- System-on-chip: 1.5 GHz Dual-core Qualcomm Snapdragon S4 MSM8960 Intel Atom Z2460 Razr i
- GPU: Adreno 225
- Memory: 1 GB RAM
- Storage: 8 GB flash memory
- Removable storage: microSD supports up to 32 GB
- Battery: 2000mAh
- Rear camera: 8MP, Sony Exmor IMX145 List: 8.0 Megapixels; HD video (1080p) at 30 FPS
- Front camera: 1.3 megapixels
- Display: 4.3″(10.9cm) edge-to-edge 960x540qHD (256 ppi) Super AMOLED Advanced display
- Connectivity: GLONASS List: NFC
- Other: Gorilla Glass 2
- Website: Motorola Mobility LLC - DROID RAZR M /Official Website

The Droid Razr M (Motorola XT905/XT906/XT907) is an Android-based, 4G LTE-capable smartphone designed by Motorola as a smaller successor to the Droid Razr. It was advertised as "The full screen phone" with thin edges, though it lacked a robust resolution. It came with a light skin of Android (operating system) for Verizon Wireless (XT907), SoftBank Mobile (201M), and Telstra as well as an unbranded retail version for the Australian market (both XT905). The Electrify M (XT901) for U.S. Cellular is a CDMA handheld with a different housing, but otherwise same specification as the Razr M.

== History ==
The lower-end Droid Razr M was announced alongside the Droid Razr HD and Razr Maxx HD on 5 September 2012. The Razr HD and M models ship with Android 4.0 (Ice Cream Sandwich). On October 26, 2012, SoftBank Group released the "201M" model in Japan featuring a "SoftBank 4G" compatibility.

The Android 4.1 (Jelly Bean) upgrade for the Razr M started rolling out on Nov 9, 2012 and the upgrade to Android 4.4 (KitKat) on May 12, 2014.

== RAZR i ==
The RAZR i (XT890) is an almost identical edition except it has an Intel Atom Z2460 processor. This means it has more processing power, but less imaging power; however, it lacks LTE support.

== See also ==
- Droid Razr
- Droid Razr HD
- Motorola Xyboard
- Google Nexus
- Galaxy Nexus
