= Ericofon =

Telephone designed by Swedish company Ericsson

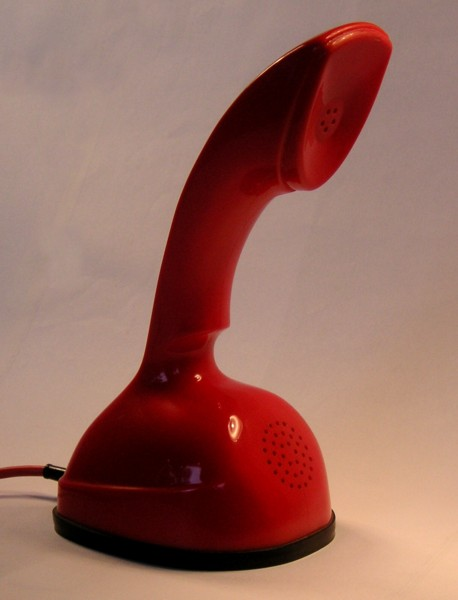
Ericofon

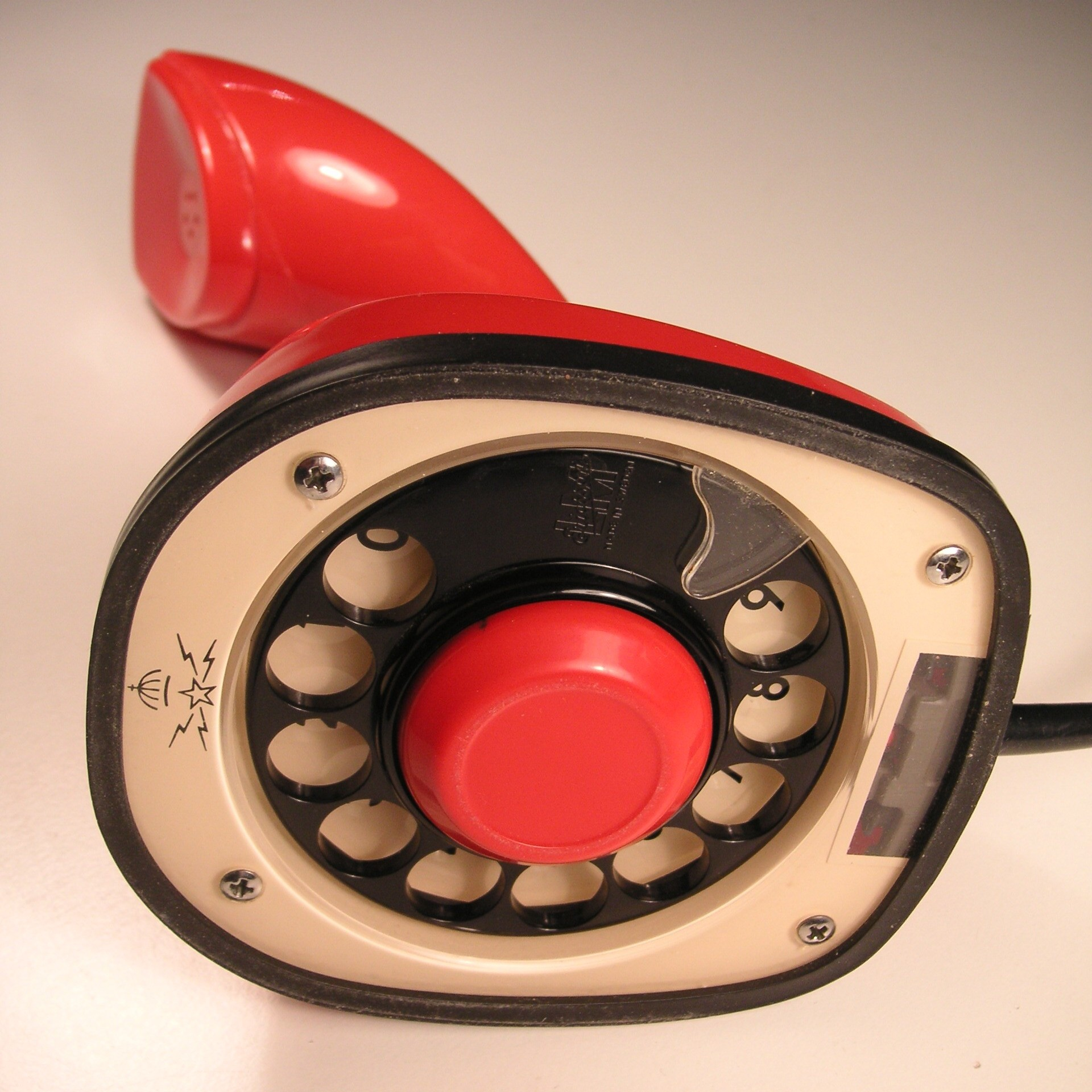
Ericofon, bottom view

The Ericofon is a one-piece plastic telephone created by the Ericsson Company of Sweden and marketed through the second half of the 20th century. It was the first commercially marketed telephone to incorporate the dial and handset into a single unit. Because of its styling and its influence on future telephone design, the Ericofon is considered one of the most significant industrial designs of the 20th century by Phaidon. It is in the collection of the Museum of Modern Art in New York City. In Sweden, the Ericofon is known as the cobra telephone for its resemblance to the hooded snake of the same name.

== History ==
The Ericofon was designed in the late 1940s by a design team including Gösta Thames, Ralph Lysell, and Hugo Blomberg. The two major components of the telephone, the handset and the dial, are combined in a single unit. This one-piece design anticipated the evolution of the typical cordless phone and cell phone by several decades. Serial production began in 1954. Early models were sold only to institutions; in 1956, however, production for the open market began in Europe and Australia.

As the Bell System did not permit the operation of third-party equipment on their network, the Ericofon could only be used by independent telephone companies in the United States. North Electric in Galion, Ohio, manufactured the Ericofon for the North American independent market.

== Colors ==
When it was introduced on the U.S. market, the Ericofon was available in 18 colors. However, after transfer of production to North Electric, the number of colors was reduced to eight. A small number of phones with clear and metallic finishes were produced for special promotions. The most popular and widely produced colors were bright red and bright white. Other colors included various pastel shades of blue, green, and pink. The phone was never produced in black.

== Ericotone ==
Most Ericofons had mechanical rotary dials, typical of all phones made in the era. While Ericofons produced by Ericsson used miniature buzzers as ringers, North Electric introduced the electronic "Ericotone" ringer. The Ericotone ringer used a simple, one-transistor oscillator circuit to produce a distinctive "chirping" sound. Colloquially, Ericofons were sometimes referred to as "tweeter" phones. This was one of the earliest uses of a transistor in a telephone; telephones with mechanical bell ringers and rotary dials did not need transistors.

== Touch-tone ==
North Electric introduced a touch-tone version of the Ericofon in the United States in 1967. Production of this variant was much lower than that of the rotary-dial Ericofons. A design flaw in the hook switch mechanism would cause the touch-tone version of the phone to come apart if it was set down too forcibly or accidentally dropped and the phone then became unusable. It was almost impossible for the average consumers to restore the hook switch mechanism to correct operating condition if it were so damaged. North Electric ceased production of the Ericofon for North America in 1972.

Ericsson introduced a push-button version of the Ericofon, the model 700, for the company's 100th anniversary in 1976. The model 700 had a squarer design than earlier models. It was not a touch-tone phone. Instead, its electronics generated electrical pulses as its buttons were pressed, simulating the pulses produced by a rotary dial. Ericsson continued to produce rotary-dial Ericofons until about 1980.

== Recent production ==
Wild and Wolf produces an Ericofon-lookalike called "Scandiphone". The modern touch-tone phone is available in several colors and can be bought from web stores. The switch hook was redesigned to be stable. The keypad of the Scandiphones was not a standard touch-tone arrangement but rather appeared in a circle to mimic a rotary dial. A few other companies made Ericofon lookalikes with a more traditional-appearing keypad with the redesigned switch hook. Some of these lookalike phones may have used actual Ericofon cases purchased from excess stock in their phones.

== Media appearances ==
The Ericofon has been seen in several feature films and TV shows, mostly in the 1960s and 1970s.

- An Ericofon appears prominently in The Twilight Zone episode "Third from the Sun", first broadcast on January 8, 1960; and is also in the episode "One More Pallbearer".
- Maddalena (Anouk Aimée) uses an Ericofon to speak with Marcello (Marcello Mastroianni) in La Dolce Vita (1960).
- A white Ericofon can be seen on the office desk of the supervillain in the movie Banco à Bangkok pour OSS 117 (1964).
- An Ericofon is used by actor Lee Philips in the Dick Van Dyke Show episode “The Man from Emperor” (1964).
- An Ericofon appears briefly in the headquarters of the enemy in the first episode "Eleven Days to Zero" (1964) of the TV series Voyage to the Bottom of the Sea.
- In the movie The World of Henry Orient (1964), Peter Sellers uses an Ericofon in his bedroom.
- Ericofons were used for several years in the detectives' office in the Australian TV series Homicide, with the phone listed by name in episode credits, and L.M Ericsson as the supplier.
- Red, white, and beige Ericofons appear throughout the underground research headquarters in "Crack in the World" (1965).
- I'll Take Sweden (1965) Starring Bob Hope and Frankie Avalon.
- June Lockhart, Marta Kristen and Mark Goddard each posed with an Ericofon in publicity shots while they were on the TV series Lost in Space (1965-1968).
- An Ericofon is featured in the opening scene in In Like Flint (1967).
- In the movie Two for The Road (1967), architect Mark Wallace (Albert Finney) receives a long-distance call at a housewarming party on an Ericofon.
- In the 1967 film Casino Royale, Le Chiffre (Orson Welles) receives a phone call from SMERSH on an Ericofon.
- Tony Curtis uses an Ericofon in his doomed house in Don't Make Waves (1967)
- In the 1969–1972 television series The Courtship of Eddie's Father, the Corbett household has an Ericofon.
- In "Doomsday" (1969), the seventeenth episode of the third season of Mission: Impossible, Jim Phelps (Peter Graves) uses a white Ericofon. In the following episode, "Live Bait", an Ericofon is the desk phone of Helmut Kellermann (Anthony Zerbe), the episode's main antagonist.
- An Ericofon is used to ask that a recovery capsule be sent to orbit in the third episode of 1970 Doctor Who serial "The Ambassadors of Death."
- Sammy Davis Jr. speaks to Kim Lee on a blue Ericofon at Pepperworth Castle while three more (two ivory and one red) are on the shelf behind him in One More Time, the 1970 film sequel to Salt And Pepper (1968).
- George Sanders (Sir Masius) takes a call from the Ambassador on a pink Ericofon during a poolside scene in spy-fi film The Girl from Rio (1969).
- A red Ericofon is used in a top-security U.S. tracking station in the episode "The Ninety-Second War: Part II" (1972) of the TV series Hawaii Five-O.
- An Ericofon is seen in the operation room of the secret service in the French movie Le grand blond avec une chaussure noire (1972).
- An Ericofon can be seen on a table in a scene from the 1973 film Theatre of Blood.
- Many Ericofons are used in the French adult comedy Young Casanova (1974).
- Ericofons are used in the Norwegian adult comedy Kosmetikkrevolusjonen (1977).
- There is a red Ericofon on Higgins' desk, in the episode "China Doll" (1980) of the TV series Magnum, P.I.
- A yellow Ericofon is placed on a table in the living room in the 1980 movie Sunday Lovers.
- Dominique Lavanant uses a red Ericofon in La boum, a 1980 French movie starring Sophie Marceau.
- Doris Roberts is seen speaking into a white Ericofon in the opening credits of Remington Steele (1982-1987).
- An Ericofon is used by Stella in the 1986 Icelandic movie Stella í orlofi.
- The character Myra Gale Brown (played by Winona Ryder) uses an Ericofon in a few scenes of Great Balls Of Fire! (1989).
- The character played by Cyndi Lauper in Off and Running uses an Ericofon at the futuristic motel run by David Keith's character.
- The character Teddy Forzman in the TV show The Adventures of Pete & Pete (1993–1996) uses an Ericofon in the third-season episode "The Trouble with Teddy."
- The character Memphis Rocket in the TV show Julia Jekyll and Harriet Hyde (1995–1998) has an orange Ericofon on the desk in his office during series one and two.
- Ericofons were featured in the 1997 movie Men in Black. They were the desk phones at workstations at headquarters.
- A modified Ericofon appeared as a prop alien telephone in the first-season episode "I, E.T." of the TV series Farscape (1999–2003).
- A character in the 1999 film But I'm a Cheerleader uses a green Ericofon.
- In the French TV movie L'affaire Ben Barka (2007), a white Ericofon is used in an office of the Paris-Orly Airport. The action takes place in 1965.
- In Mad Men (2007–2012), Roger Sterling uses an Ericofon in his new office. The action is set in the 1960s.
- In the Argentinian movie El Secreto De Sus Ojos from 2009 an Ericofon is used. The scene is dated in the mid seventies.
- In the episode "There Is Another Sky" (2010) of the TV series Caprica, Joseph Adama receives a call on an Ericofon.
- In the Dutch movie "The kidnapping of Freddy Heineken" (2011), a red Ericofon was used. The story plays in 1983.
- In the 2015 film The Man from U.N.C.L.E., Victoria Vinciguerra is briefly seen speaking on an aqua mist colored Ericofon.
- In the opening scene of the 1958 science-fiction movie Queen of Outer Space, Ericofons are seen on desks in a military headquarters.
- In the first episode of 2017 Spanish spin-off series set in the 1960s, Velvet Colección, Clara uses a green Ericofon.
- Four Ericofons, one of which is red, are used as stage props for the YouTube channel "The Korean War by Indy Neidell" series on the Korean War. From the series' beginning on June 25, 2024, Narrator/historic researcher Indy Neidell is often seen speaking into one or another at the start of an episode as if in the period.

== See also ==
- Trimphone: Another telephone from the same era.
- Trimline: AT&T's answer to the Ericofon, the Trimline phone incorporated a dial into the handset but had a separate cradle containing the ringer.
- Grillo: Another innovative telephone, from Italy. Its design anticipated the cellular "flip phone".
