= Motorola Razr 50 =

Smartphone model

Motorola Razr 50/50s
- Brand: Motorola
- Manufacturer: Motorola
- Type: Smartphone
- Series: Motorola Razr
- First released: June 25, 2024
- Predecessor: Motorola Razr 40
- Related: Motorola Razr 50 Ultra
- Form factor: Clamshell
- Operating system: Android 14
- System-on-chip: MediaTek Dimensity 7300X
- Memory: 8GB, 12GB RAM
- Storage: 256GB, 512GB
- Battery: 4,200 mAh, 33W charging
- Rear camera: 50MP main, 13MP ultrawide
- Display: 6.9" FHD+ pOLED, 10–120Hz refresh rate
- Connectivity: 5G, Wi-Fi, Bluetooth, NFC

The Motorola Razr 50 is a foldable smartphone developed by Motorola Mobility. Launched in 2024, it is part of the Motorola Razr series, known for its foldable design.

On September 24, 2024, Motorola unveiled the Motorola Razr 50s, a variant of the Motorola Razr 50 for Japanese carrier SoftBank.

== Design ==
The Motorola Razr 50 features a clamshell foldable design, With a rubber pad on the back, utilizing a 6.9-inch pOLED display that supports a variable refresh rate from 10 to 120 Hz.

== Specifications ==
=== Hardware ===
The Razr 50 is powered by a MediaTek Dimensity 7300X chipset, accompanied by options of 8GB or 12GB of RAM and 256GB or 512GB of internal storage. It houses a 4,200mAh battery, supporting 33W fast charging, to cater to extended usage.

=== Camera ===
This model includes a dual-camera setup on the back with a 50MP main sensor and a 13MP ultrawide lens, catering to versatile photography needs.

== See also ==
- Smartphone
- Android (operating system)
