= Motorola RAZR i =

Smartphone designed by Motorola Mobility

Motorola RAZR i/XT890
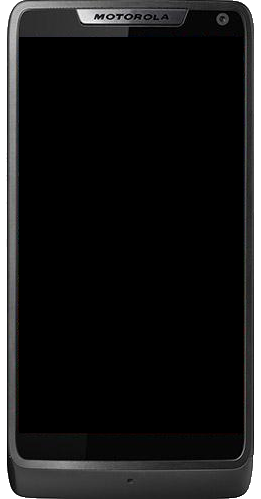
- An Image of the Motorola RAZR i/XT890
- Brand: Droid Razr
- Manufacturer: Motorola Mobility
- Type: Smartphone
- Series: Motorola Razr
- First released: 18 September 2012
- Related: Droid RAZR M
- Compatible networks: 2G GSM/GPRS/EDGE – 850, 900, 1800, 1900 MHz B1, B8 Rx Diversity; 3G UMTS/HSPA+/W-CDMA – 850, 900, 1700, 1900, 2100 MHz
- Form factor: Slate
- Dimensions: 4.82 in × 2.39 in × 0.33 in (122.43 mm × 60.71 mm × 8.38 mm)
- Weight: 4.44 oz (126 g)
- Operating system: Android 4.4.2 KitKat
- System-on-chip: Intel Atom Z2480 Medfield
- CPU: 2 GHz single-core Saltwell with HT
- GPU: PowerVR SGX 540 @ 400 MHz
- Memory: 1 GB RAM
- Storage: 8 GB flash memory
- Removable storage: microSD supports up to 32 GB
- Battery: 2000mAh
- Rear camera: 8 megapixels HD video
- Front camera: VGA (0.3 MP)
- Display: 4.3″(10.9cm) edge-to-edge qHD Super AMOLED Advanced touchscreen, 540×960 pixels (256 dpi), 16M colors
- Connectivity: NFC, Bluetooth, Wi-Fi
- Data inputs: Multi-touch capacitive touchscreen
- Other: Corning Gorilla Glass 2, DuPont Kevlar fibre

The Motorola RAZR i (XT890) is a smartphone designed by Motorola Mobility. It was officially announced on 18 September 2012 in London, UK.

The RAZR i is the first smartphone by Motorola to feature an Intel Atom "Medfield" processor/SOC of the x86/IA-32 architecture, running a x86 port of the Android operating system. It is also the first smartphone with a CPU clocked at 2.0 GHz in its stock configuration. Externally, it looks identical to its sibling Motorola RAZR M launched two weeks earlier in the US, with which it also shares many of its specs. The RAZR i is an almost identical edition except it has an Intel Atom Z2460 processor., which gives it more processing power and imaging power; although it lacks LTE support. Initially it was reported that it does not fully support many high-end apps and games designed for ARM processors until these apps or games are ported and recompiled for Intel compatibility. However, Intel developed a binary emulator called Houdini that is present on the RAZR i, to allow ARM code to run on x86 architecture. A test showed that the RAZR i was able to run most ARM Android apps thanks to the background emulation, but that a few apps would still not function.

A special China-only version of the smartphone, the RAZR i MT788 was announced in November, 2012.

The GPU in the RAZR i's Intel Atom Z2460 processor is a PowerVR SGX540, a faster-clocked version of the same GPU as in the Samsung Galaxy Nexus and many older smartphones such as the original Samsung Galaxy S. While the RAZR i's raw CPU processing power can be excellent for tasks such as web browsing, its GPU can be considerably slower than the RAZR M, which uses a Snapdragon S4 CPU featuring an Adreno 225 GPU. This may be alleviated somewhat by the Atom Z2460 being capable of providing much greater memory bandwidth, which has traditionally been a severe performance-constraining factor in ARM-based chips.

Despite being the first product from a "multi-year, multi-device" partnership between Motorola and Intel, no other Intel-powered Motorola smartphone was ever released afterwards.

== Specifications ==
=== Software ===
- Operating system: Android 4.4.2 KitKat

=== Chipset ===
- SoC: Intel Atom Z2460 Medfield
- CPU Architecture: x86 (IA-32)
- Processor: 32nm, 2000 MHz Saltwell with hyper-threading (2 threads), single Penwell core, 568 Kb total cache (MMX, SSE, SSE2, SSE3, SSSE3, EM64T, NX/XD, HT, BPT)
- Memory: 1024 MB LPDDR2-800 RAM / 8192 MB ROM
- Available user storage space: ~5 GB
- Storage expansion: microSD, microSDHC up to 32 GB

=== Display ===
- Display size: 4.3 inches
- Resolution: 540 x 960 pixels
- Pixel density: 256 ppi
- Technology: Super AMOLED Advanced
- Colors: 16777216
- Touchscreen: Capacitive, Multi-touch
- Special Features: Light sensor, Proximity sensor, Scratch-resistant glass, splash resistant coating

=== Camera ===
- Rear camera: 8 megapixels
- Front-facing camera: 0.3 megapixels VGA
- Flash: LED
- Features: back-illuminated sensor (BSI), auto focus, burst mode, digital zoom, geo tagging, high-dynamic-range mode (HDR)
- Camcorder: 1920x1080 (1080p HD) (30 fps)
- Features: video calling

=== Compatible networks ===
- GSM: 850, 900, 1800, 1900 MHz
- UMTS:850, 900, 1900, 2100 MHz

=== Connectivity and communication ===
- Data: DC-HSDPA, 42 Mbit/s; HSDPA, 21 Mbit/s; HSUPA, 5.76 Mbit/s/s, UMTS, EDGE, GPRS
- Positioning: GPS, A-GPS
- Communication: Wi-Fi, NFC, Bluetooth

=== Battery ===
- Capacity: 2000 mAh

== See also ==
- Motorola RAZR M
