= Biennale of Design =

Design exhibition in Ljubljana, Slovenia

The Biennale of Design (Slovene: bienale oblikovanja; BIO) is an international design exhibition which has been held continuously since 1964 in Ljubljana, Slovenia, as the first design biennial in Europe.

== History ==
The Ljubljana Biennial of Industrial Design (Slovene: Bienale industrijskega oblikovanja Ljubljana) was officially founded in the autumn of 1963 at the initiative of the Ljubljana City Council, the Chamber of Commerce of the Socialist Republic of Slovenia, and various professional associations. The exhibition was conceived as a biennial forum to compare Yugoslav and foreign achievements in industry. In addition to the Triennale di Milano, BIO was one of the most important European design events in the 1960s, and the first biennial of its kind in the world.

The purpose of the Biennale was to promote and facilitate the development of Yugoslav industrial production, to influence the exchange of well-designed industrial objects on national and international markets, and to raise the general level of design apperception and good taste through educational and information campaigns. For more than forty years, BIO exhibitions followed the same concept created for the first Biennial in 1964 (BIO 1), when objects were organized according to the following categories: furniture, lamps, textiles, hospitality, household appliances and appliances, optical objects, electrical engineering, machinery and telecommunications equipment, machinery, industrial products from the mechanical engineering industry, sports equipment, toys, architectural details, transport, packaging, and visual Communication.

The Biennial of Industrial Design has been held at the Ljubljana Museum of Architecture and Design (MAO) since the museum's founding in 1972.

In 2010, an accompanying exhibition titled "Alvar Aalto Houses – Timeless Expressions" was organised in collaboration with Alvar Aalto Foundation and museum, and the Embassy of Finland in Slovenia.

At the end of the first decade of the 21st century, the Biennale experienced gradual changes in its concept. BIO 21 (2008) dispensed with national selections and thus gave everyone the opportunity to submit their work. All works were reviewed by an international selection committee and, as always, the prizes were awarded by an international jury. In 2011, the Biennale of Industrial Design was renamed the Biennial of Design. BIO 23 (2012) was the first curated biennial, the subject of which being design relations.

In 2014, under the guidance of Belgian critic and curator Jan Boelen, it ceased to award actual design products, and instead begun to grant a "Best Collaboration Award" selected by an international jury and presented at the opening ceremony.

Its 2019 edition (BIO26) titled "Common Knowledge" and curated by Austrian design curator Thomas Geisler and assistant curator Aline Lara Rezende, focused on information crisis due to social media-propagated fake news and the design of online news publications.

The 27th edition of Ljubljana Biennale of Design (BIO27) titled Super Vernaculars opened in May 2022. It was curated by British design critic and writer Jane Withers and focused on how designers and architects are re-evaluating vernacular traditions and value systems to address contemporary design issues such as water scarcity, waste management, and protecting biodiversity.
