= Motorola Photon =

Motorola smartphone

Motorola Photon 4G
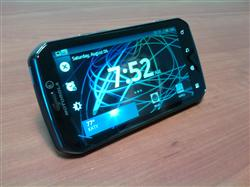
- The Motorola Photon 4G at rest
- Manufacturer: Motorola
- First released: US: July 31, 2011
- Availability by region: US: Q3-2011
- Successor: Motorola Photon Q
- Related: Motorola Atrix 4G Motorola Photon Q
- Compatible networks: WiMAX 2.5 GHz, CDMA 800/1900 MHz (EV-DO Rev. A), GSM 850/900/1800/1900 MHz, UMTS/WCDMA 850/1900/2100 MHz (HSPA+ at 14.4 Mbit/s)
- Form factor: Touchscreen smartphone
- Dimensions: 126.9 mm (5.00 in) H 66.9 mm (2.63 in) W 12.2 mm (0.48 in) D
- Weight: 158 g (5.6 oz)
- Operating system: Android 2.3.5 Gingerbread
- CPU: NVIDIA Tegra 2 dual-core 1 GHz (Cortex-A9 dual-core)
- GPU: GeForce ULP
- Memory: 1 GB LP DDR2 RAM
- Storage: 16 GB on board, supports up to 32 GB microSDHC, total 48 GB
- Battery: 1700 mAh Talk time WCDMA = 9.1 hrs GSM = 10.4 hrs Standby time WCDMA = 13.1 days GSM = 12.2 days
- Rear camera: 8 MP AF, digital zoom with LED Flash; Capture – 720p MPEG4 and H.264 at 30 frame/s (full 1080p may be supported via software upgrade post-launch)
- Front camera: VGA imager for video chat, self image capture
- Display: 4.3-inch 960×540 px qHD TFT LCD at 275 ppi, 16 M colors, Gorilla Glass
- Connectivity: audio jack 3.5 mm, Micro USB 2.0 HS, corporate sync, BOTA, Wi-Fi 2.4 GHz, 5 GHz 802.11 b/g/n, Bluetooth 2.1 EDR, Micro-HDMI
- Data inputs: Multi-touch capacitive touchscreen display, accelerometer, magnetometer, ambient light sensor, proximity sensor, fingerprint reader
- Hearing aid compatibility: M4/T4
- Other: Android WebKit with Adobe Flash Player, Mozilla Firefox 4.0.1 in Motorola Webtop mode, eCompass, aGPS with Google Maps, Google Street View, Google Latitude, Android Market

The Motorola Photon 4G was a high end Android-based mobile smartphone that was distributed exclusively by Sprint. A very similar model was available as the Motorola Electrify from U.S. Cellular.

== User interface ==
The Photon runs a customized interface similar to the standard Android interface with several additions. Motorola provides custom widgets to toggle settings for airplane mode, Bluetooth, wireless 4G access (WiMAX 2.5 GHz), and WiFi access as well as resizable widgets for functions such as the calendar, social networking, a world clock and more. The Photon's customized interface has seven home screens and four main onscreen buttons at the bottom of the screen. Of the bottom buttons the left three buttons may be customized to run a program of the user's choosing, while the right-most button opens the app drawer.

Capacitive touch buttons at the bottom of the screen are Menu, Home, Back and Search. Pressing and holding on the Home button brings up a "Recent Apps" view, while double tapping the Home button will either show a thumbnailed view of all seven home screens (default) or, at the user's preference, quick launch a specific function.

== Connectivity ==
The Photon is an international-capable phone ("world phone"), meaning that besides using Sprint's CDMA/EV-DO network and other CDMA networks accessible internationally and through domestic roaming; it accepts a GSM SIM card with quadband GSM and triband UMTS/WCDMA/HSPA+ capabilities. The phone also, like most Android phones, features WiFi access, Bluetooth 2.1, GPS, 3.5mm headset jack, and a micro-USB port for charging and data sync with a PC. An HDMI port allows for access to HDMI-mirroring and separate functions.

== Business and Enterprise features ==
The Photon supports several important business features. It supports access to Microsoft Exchange Server mail servers, including the support of several Exchange ActiveSync profiles. Second, full encryption of the internal and external storage is supported. This last feature requires the creation of a password that is required when booting the phone.

Motorola provides several additional software packages for PCs and Mac, such as Motorola Media Link (to manage photos, music and video) and the Motorola Phone Portal (manage phone and contents from a web browser over a network link).

== Webtop ==
Similarly to the Motorola Atrix 4G, it has the integrated Ubuntu-based 'Webtop' application from Motorola. The Webtop application is launched when the phone is connected to the external display through Laptop dock or HD multimedia dock. In Webtop mode, offering similar user interface of typical Ubuntu desktop, the phone can run several applications on external display such as Firefox web browser, SNS clients and 'mobile view' application enabling total access of the Photon and its screen. In September 2011, Motorola released the source code of Webtop application at SourceForge.

== Detailed specifications ==
- Also known as Motorola MB855
- NVIDIA Tegra 2 (dual-core 1 GHz ARM Cortex-A9 + GeForce ULP)
- World phone capable of running on multiple types of networks (WiMAX/CDMA/GSM/UMTS)
- Android 2.3 "Gingerbread"
- 1 GB LP DDR2 RAM
- 16 GB internal memory, expandable by microSD 32 GB, total of 48 GB
- 4.3-inch PenTile qHD display (540×960) with Gorilla Glass
- 8.0 MP with dual LED flash, 4x digital zoom and autofocus, 1080p video capture at 30 frame/s
- VGA front-facing camera for video calls
- TriColor LED notification light
- 1650 mAh user-changeable battery
- Built-in kickstand
- Motorola Webtop interface
- HDMI mirroring
- 126.9 by 66.9 by 12.2 millimetres (5.00 in × 2.63 in × 0.48 in)
- 158 grams (5.6 oz)

== Android updates ==
In 2011, Motorola joined the Android Upgrade Alliance, promising to release operating system updates to all its phones for 18 months following initial release. However, in October 2012, Motorola announced in a forum post that several phones, including the Photon 4G, will not receive updates to Android 4.0 Ice Cream Sandwich, instead offering a rebate program for users to trade up to newer devices. Punit Soni, who runs software product management for Motorola Mobility, stated "I think some of them [loyal customers] have gotten a raw deal, We understand strongly and apologize for it."

== See also ==
- Motorola Xoom
- Motorola Droid Bionic
- Motorola Cliq 2
- Galaxy Nexus

Other phones with Tegra 2 SoC:

- LG Optimus 2X
- Motorola Atrix
- Samsung Galaxy R
- Droid X2
