= Spice (disambiguation) =

Spices are plant substances used for flavoring as a food additive.

Spice or SPICE may also refer to:

== Music ==
- Spice (British band), a 1960s rock band
- Spice (Canadian band), a Canadian pop and folk band
- Spice (American band), an American rock supergroup
- Spice (musician), Jamaican dancehall artist Grace Latoya Hamilton (born 1982)
- Ice Spice, American rapper Isis Naija Gaston (born 2000)
- Richie Spice, Jamaican reggae artist Richell Bonner (born 1971)
- Spice, a percussionist for the band Dread Zeppelin
- Spice (album), a 1996 album by the girl group Spice Girls
- "Spice" (Perfume song), 2011
- "Spice", a song by Psychic Fever from Exile Tribe, 2023

== Organizations ==
- Spice Engineering, a British racing team
- Spice Telecom, a former Indian telecommunications company
- Spice TV, Africa's first dedicated English-language specialty channel for fashion
- Spice Network, a group of adult television channels
- Susan Polgar Institute of Chess Excellence

== People ==
- Gordon Spice (born 1940), British former racing driver
- Jason Spice (born 1974), New Zealand international rugby union player and first-class cricketer
- Michael Spice (1931–1983), British actor
- nickname of Anthony Adams (born 1980), American former National Football League player, television host, actor and comedian

== Science and technology ==
=== Communications, circuitry and electronics ===
- Simple Protocol for Independent Computing Environments (SPICE), a remote-connection sharing protocol
- SPICE, an electronic circuit simulator
- SPICE (observation geometry system), a NASA space mission geometry software system
- Software Process Improvement and Capability Determination, ISO 15504, a process-assessment framework
- Small Projects in a Controlled Environment, a reduced version of PRINCE2 for managing small projects
- Motorola Spice, a smartphone developed by Motorola
- Space Internetworking Center, a Greek research center focused on space communications

=== Other science and technology ===
- Stratospheric Particle Injection for Climate Engineering, a UK solar geoengineering research project
- Spice (oceanography)
- Bautek Spice, a German hang glider
- SPICE, an Israeli bomb guidance kit
- SPICE, Super-fast Parallel In-memory Calculation Engine in Amazon QuickSight

== Other uses ==
- Setia SPICE, George Town, Penang, Malaysia
- SPICE station, a proposed light rail transit station in George Town, Penang
- SPICE or SPICES (simplicity, peace, integrity, community, equality, stewardship), an acronym representing the principal testimonies in Quaker practical theology
- Melange (fictional drug) or "the spice", a drug in the Dune novels by Frank Herbert
- Spice, a drug in the Star Wars universe
- Spice, a slang term for synthetic cannabinoids (also known as synthetic marijuana)

== See also ==
- Spice 1, American rapper Robert Lee Greene Jr. (born 1970)
- Pungency, that is culinary spice, heat, etc.
