= Motoblur =

User interface

- Motoblur UI as seen on a Motorola Charm
- Developer: Motorola Mobility
- OS family: Android
- Source model: Closed source
- Official website: Motoblur

Motoblur (often stylized as MOTOBLUR) is a discontinued Android user interface and push-based service focused on social networking, developed by Motorola. It first appeared on the Motorola Cliq/Motorola Dext in 2009 and last shipped on 2011 model Androids.

It aimed at functional similarity to Palm's Synergy, including such features as Remote Wipe. Motoblur included a variety of widgets which combined various social networking portals such as Facebook, MySpace, and Twitter as well as other services (news or weather reports) all in one place. It also combined multiple email accounts and contact communication sources into singular notification views, being the first handset software to do so. Feeds and data were regularly pushed to these widgets.

First generation Motoblur-based phones required a new user to create a Motoblur account, denying access to the main screen until the account was established. User account information was stored on Motorola's redundant servers for access from web browsers and future phones. Newer devices allowed users to defer Blur services until a later registration and had more filtering options and better battery management to optimize the user experience.

In late 2010 Motorola announced that Motoblur would not be their development focus in the future, as Android made custom skins largely redundant. The Atrix, Droid 2 and Droid X do feature the UI skin. Subsequent Motorola Mobility smartphones (under Google and later Lenovo) from 2013 onwards runs near-stock version of Android instead of Motoblur, often branded as "Hello UI" in more recent Moto, Edge and Razr lineups.

== Reception ==
In 2011 PC World criticised Motoblur for poor performance.

== Devices that used Motoblur ==
Motoblur in its final inception was on these devices: Electrify/Photon 4G, Atrix 4G, Atrix HD, CLIQ/DEXT, Backflip, Devour, Flipout, Charm, Spice, Droid Pro, Filpside, DEFY, DEFY+, Bravo, Droid X, Droid 3, Droid 2, Droid Bionic, and Droid RAZR. The version found on the Droid X, Droid Pro, Droid 2, Droid Bionic, Droid 3, Electrify/Photon 4G, and DEFY was intended to be less intrusive than previous versions.
