= Motorola Photon Q =

Smartphone manufactured by Motorola

Motorola Photon Q 4G LTE
- Manufacturer: Motorola
- First released: August 2012; 13 years ago
- Predecessor: Motorola Photon; Motorola Atrix HD
- Successor: Droid MAXX/Ultra
- Related: Motorola Atrix 4G Motorola Photon Motorola Droid 4
- Form factor: Slate, slider
- Operating system: Android 4.1.2 Jelly Bean upgradable to Android 7.1 Nougat via LineageOS 14.1
- CPU: 1.5 GHz dual-core Snapdragon S4 (MSM8960) or 1.6 GHz dual core Snapdragon 400
- GPU: Adreno 305 or Adreno 320
- Memory: 1 GB
- Storage: 8 GB on board and MicroSD slot

The Motorola Photon Q 4G LTE (XT897) is a smartphone manufactured by Motorola which runs on Sprint's 4G LTE network. The "Photon Q" has a 4.3-inch touchscreen and a 1.5 GHz dual-core processor. It runs the Android operating system and includes a built-in, sliding keyboard similar to the one on the Motorola Droid 4.

As of 2018 it is still the most modern Android phone with a landscape slide-out QWERTY keyboard. As such, there is still demand for this phone, including those in the Android developer community. Enthusiasts and free developers have shown that it is possible to desolder the on-board SIM IC and connect a SIM socket/card to use this phone in other networks or countries.

== Software ==
The Photon Q launched with Android 4.0, Ice Cream Sandwich, and was considered a flagship/halo device for the operating system, thanks to its 1.5 GHz Snapdragon S4 Plus. On April 25, 2013, the Photon Q was upgraded to the 4.1.2 Jelly Bean version of Android. However, it was excluded from future Android upgrades, and will remain with 4.1.2 Jelly Bean. Motorola has not provided any public-facing explanation for why Android 4.4, KitKat was not released for the device - or any future Android releases. The Photon Q did not receive Motorola's benchmarked two-year target for software upgrades, which was later dropped, again without any public explanation.

=== Community software ===
LineageOS Version 14.1 (tracking Android 7.1 Nougat) was updated until February 2019 at which time LineageOS 14.1 was discontinued for all devices.

Team Win Recovery Project Currently supported (as of May 2018) with 3.0.2-0 as the latest version available for download from the official TWRP website.

SailfishOS 3.0 Available through a community port, latest (as of July 2019) is 3.1.0.9.

== Hardware ==
The processor of the Moto Photon Q is a 1.5 GHz Snapdragon S4 Plus dual core CPU. It includes 1GB of RAM, and notable for its time, a micro-HDMI port. The Snapdragon S4 family of processors were jointly supported by Qualcomm and Google through the Android 6.0, Marshmallow release cycles. The Photon Q shares most of its platform underpinnings with the Motorola Droid RAZR (XT925), CDMA RAZR HD (XT926), Atrix HD (MB886), and Droid RAZR M (XT907), albeit shipping with Sprint adaptations.

The device is compatible with Motorola lapdock devices. While Motorola's Webtop desktop shell was not supported, the device works with Lapdock 100 and Lapdock 500 in "mirror mode" with the final ice cream sandwich update, however support and functionality were discontinued with the Jellybean update. Additionally, it functions as an Android laptop solution when paired with LineageOS or another modern community ROM with multi-window support.
