= Motodext =

Smartphone

- Manufacturer: Motorola
- Type: Slider Smartphone
- Operating system: Motoblur
- CPU: Qualcomm 32-bit RISC ARM 528 MHz
- Memory: 256 MB ram
- Storage: micro sd up to 32 gb
- Display: 320 × 480 px, 3.1 in (79 mm), 2:3 aspect ratio, 262,144-color LCD
- Input: Multi-touch display, headset controls, 3-axis accelerometer
- Camera: 5.0 megapixels
- Connectivity: Wi-Fi (802.11b/g), Bluetooth 2.0+EDR, USB 2.0 Quad band GSM 850 900 1800 1900 GPRS/EDGEHSDPA 850, 1900, 2100 also supports: 7.2 Mbps HSDPA

The Motodext is a Google Android-based Internet-connected, multimedia GSM smartphone designed and marketed by Motorola. It has a physical keyboard, the touch screen renders a virtual keyboard when necessary. It is Motorola's first android-based device that has a new user interface called Motoblur which was introduced with the phone. This phone will be marketed as Motocliq for US and Motodext for the rest of the world.

== See also ==
- Motoblur
- Motocliq
