= PVL =

The initialism PVL may refer to:

- The paleontological collection of the Fundación-Instituto Miguel Lillo, Universidad Nacional de Tucumán
- Parameter Value Language, the data markup language, used by NASA
- Panton–Valentine leukocidin, a factor in bacterial virulence
- The Pascack Valley Line, a commuter rail line operated by NJ Transit
- Pascoe Vale railway station, Melbourne
- Periventricular leukomalacia, the death of brain tissue, caused by lack of oxygen
- Peter Van Loan, a Canadian politician
- Pike County Airport in Pikeville, Kentucky, IATA Code
- Postal Officers' Union, Finland
- Premier Volleyball League, a professional volleyball league in the Philippines
- The Primary Chronicle (Church Slavonic: Повѣсть времѧньныхъ лѣтъ, romanized: Pověstĭ vremęnĭnyxŭ lětŭ, "Tale of Bygone Years"), a historically important Rus' chronicle
- Prime Volleyball League, a professional volleyball league in India
- Program Validation Limited, a British company that developed SPARK
- Proliferative verrucous leukoplakia, a condition in the oral mucosa
