= Motorola Calgary =

2009 Android smartphone by Motorola

- Manufacturer: Motorola
- Type: Slider smartphone
- Dimensions: 115.8 mm (4.56 in) (h); 60 mm (2.4 in) (w); 13.7 mm (0.54 in) (d)
- Weight: 169 g (6.0 oz)
- Operating system: Android
- CPU: TI OMAP 3430: Arm Cortex A8 550 mHz 430MHz TMS320 C64x DSP + ISP (Image Signal Processor)
- GPU: PowerVR SGX 530
- Memory: RAM: 256MB, ROM: 512MB
- Storage: Onboard Flash memory: 512MB/Expandable up to 32 GB.
- Battery: 1400 mAh; Internal rechargeable removable lithium-ion polymer battery
- Rear camera: 3.0 megapixel with auto focus and flash
- Display: 854 x 480 px, 3.2 in (81 mm), WVGA, 265 pixels per inch (ppi)
- Connectivity: USB Micro-B; Wi-Fi (802.11b/g), Bluetooth 2.1+EDR, Dual band CDMA2000/EV-DO Rev. A 800 1900 MHz
- Data inputs: Multi-touch capacitive touchscreen display, QWERTY keyboard
- Hearing aid compatibility: M3/T3

The Motorola Calgary is an Android-based smartphone by Motorola to be initially distributed by Verizon Wireless in the United States. Features of the phone include Wi-Fi networking, a 3-megapixel low light capable digital camera, a standard 3.5 mm headphone jack, interchangeable battery, 3.2-inch touchscreen, MicroSDHC support, QWERTY keyboard, and Texas Instruments OMAP 3430 processor. The Motorola Calgary runs version 1.6, codenamed doughnut, of Google's Android operating system. The phone does, however, run the re-branded MOTOBLUR version of Android, instead of providing the Google Experience skin and application stack. The phone could possibly be a more affordable alternative to the Motorola Droid. Recent photos have leaked, having the phone differ largely form the original render, now seen in the colors black and silver, still running MOTOBlur. It is also assumed that Verizon will release it under the name DROID Devour, as their current Android device naming is out into place.

== See also ==
- List of Android devices
- Galaxy Nexus
