= IPDA =

IPDA may refer to:

- Isophorone diamine, a chemical compound
- International Public Debate Association, a US national debate league
- International Planetary Data Alliance, a planetary research data organization
- Inferior pancreaticoduodenal artery, a blood vessel
