= Motorola Flipout =

Android-based smartphone

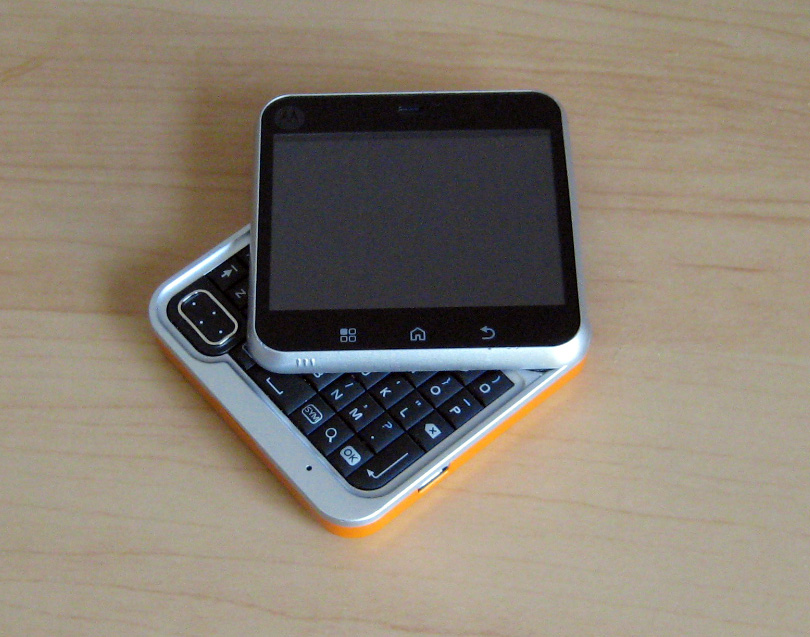
- Manufacturer: Motorola
- Type: Flip smartphone
- First released: June 2010
- Availability by region: 17 October 2010 (United States); 16 June 2010 (United Kingdom); 26 January 2012 (Botswana)
- Form factor: Swivel smartphone
- Dimensions: 67 mm (2.6 in) (h); 67 mm (2.6 in) (w); 17 mm (0.67 in) (d)
- Weight: 120 g (4.2 oz)
- Operating system: Android 2.1 (can be upgraded to unofficial CyanogenMod 7.1 (Android 2.3.7 "Gingerbread")
- CPU: 720 MHz Texas Instruments OMAP3410 processor
- Memory: 512 MB ROM, 512 MB RAM
- Removable storage: Supports up to 32 GB microSD
- Battery: 1170 mAh; Internal rechargeable removable lithium-ion battery
- Rear camera: 3.2-megapixel
- Display: 320 x 240 px, 2.8 in (71 mm), QVGA, 256k color LCD
- Connectivity: Wi-Fi (802.11b/g), Bluetooth 2.1, MicroUSB, A-GPS; Quad band GSM 850 900 1800 1900 MHz GPRS/EDGE; Dual band UMTS 850 1900 MHz (US), UMTS 900 2100 MHz (UK) HSDPA/HSUPA (7.2/2 Mbit/s)
- Data inputs: capacitive touchscreen display, QWERTY keyboard

The Motorola Flipout (model no. MB511, also styled FLIPOUT) is a swivel-style smartphone designed by Motorola, announced on June 2, 2010. Its square-shaped body has two parts that rotate near the bottom-right corner to reveal a five-row QWERTY keyboard below the screen. The Flipout has a 2.8 inch touchscreen display (QVGA 320×240 pixels) and runs on Android 2.1 (Eclair) with the Motoblur interface.

The Flipout came in a wide variety of colors such as "Poppy Red", "Brilliant Blue″, "Licorice Black", "White", and "Saffron", although availability depended on region.

== Applications ==
Users may customize the phone by installing apps through the Android Market; however, some carriers (AT&T) do not give users the option to install non-market apps onto the Flipout (a policy they have continued with all of their Android phones and which was already in effect with the Backflip). Users can circumvent this limitation by manually installing 3rd party apps using the tools included with the SDK while the device is connected to a desktop.

== System upgrades ==
=== Android 2.3 ===
Since Motorola won't provide further updates for the Flipout, CyanogenMod 7.2 (Android 2.3.7) is used to update the device beyond official releases. Work was carried out at Xda-developers to update the Flipout to Android Gingerbread.

=== Root access ===
The Flipout was successfully "rooted" (manipulated to provide Superuser access). This allowed installing and launching custom software, and root access on the phone using a Terminal emulator. Later on, the Flipout was rooted using APK applications such as Superuser Permissions.

== Specifications ==
The Flipout replaces the bigger Backflip. The specifications according to the Motorola website as of October 2010 are:

- Model MB511
- Screen size: 3.1-in.
- Screen resolution: QVGA (320 x 240 pixels)
- Weight: 4.2 oz (120 g)
- Size: 53.0 × 108.0 × 15.3 mm
- Input devices: QWERTY keyboard, touchscreen
- Battery: 1170 mAh Lithium-Ion 3.7 V Motorola BT60
- Processor: 720 mHz
- RAM: 512 MB
- ROM: 512 MB
- Memory: up to 32 GB microSD
- Wi-FI: 802.11b/g
- Bluetooth: 2.1 + EDR and A2DP
- GPS receiver, accelerometer
- Dual microphone with noise cancellation
- 3.1 megapixels

== Gallery ==
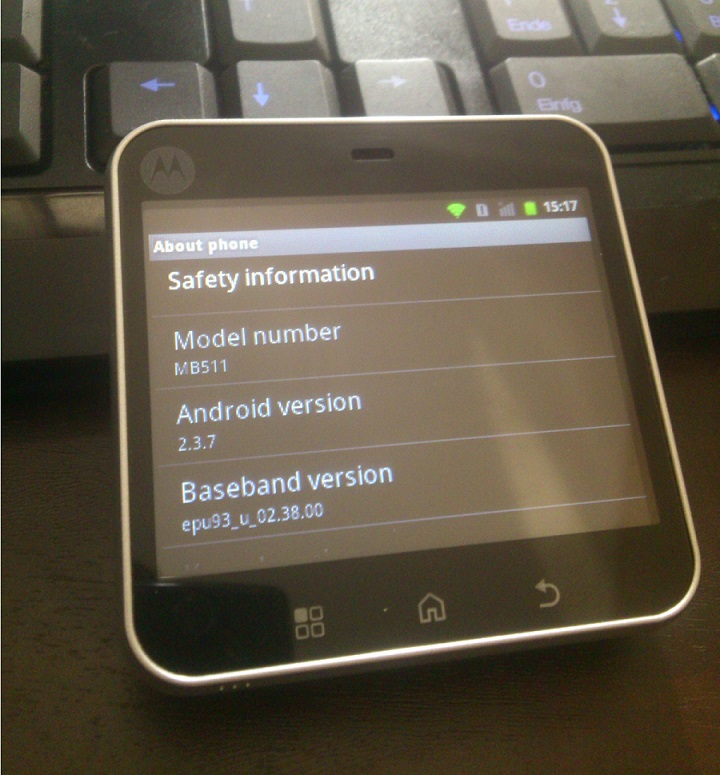
Motorola MB511 running CyanogenMod 7.2

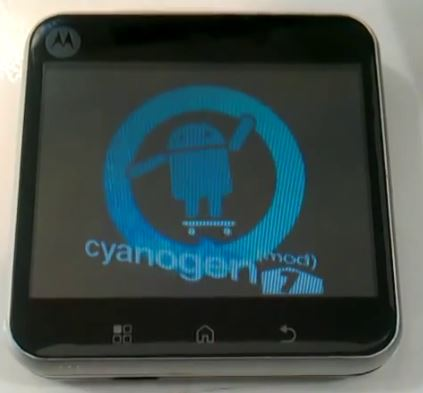
Motorola MB511 running CyanogenMod 7.2

== See also ==
- List of Android smartphones
- Motorola
