= Backflip (disambiguation) =

Backflip may refer to:

- Backflip (acrobatic)
- Backflip (figure skating)
- "Backflip" (song), a song by Raven-Symoné from her album This Is My Time
- Backflip Studios, a video game publisher
- Motorola Backflip, a mobile phone
- Backflip!!, Japanese sports anime television series
