= Motorola Charm =

Android smartphone developed by Motorola Mobility

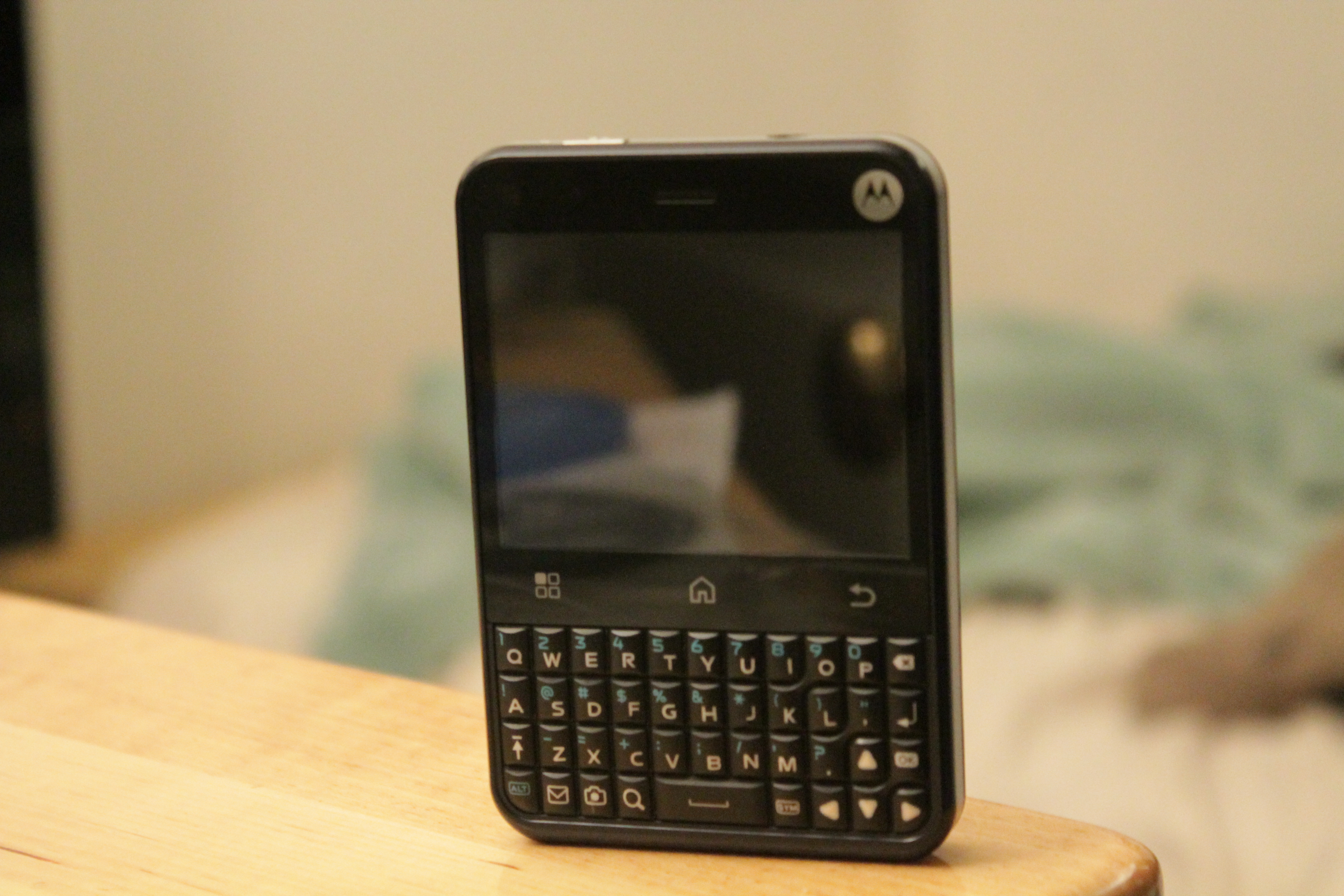
- Manufacturer: Motorola
- Type: Bar smartphone
- Compatible networks: GSM 850/900/1800/1900, EDGE; UMTS 900/1700/2100
- Dimensions: 67.2 mm (2.65 in) H 98.4 mm (3.87 in) W 11.4 mm (0.45 in) D
- Weight: 110 g (3.9 oz)
- Operating system: Android 2.1 Eclair
- CPU: 720 MHz TI OMAP 3410 processor
- Memory: RAM: 256 MB, ROM: 512 MB
- Storage: Flash memory: 256 MB, 199 free microSD slot: supports up to 32 GB
- Removable storage: microSD (TransFlash), up to 32 GB, 2 GB included
- Battery: Standard battery, Li-ion 1170 mAh, stand-by: up to 320 h, talk time: up to 405 minutes
- Rear camera: 3 megapixel with auto focus, geotagging
- Display: 320 x 240 px (0.15 megapixels), 2.8 in (71 mm), TFT LCD, QVGA
- Connectivity: Wi-Fi (802.11b/g/n), Bluetooth 2.0+EDR, ExtUSB, A-GPS
- Data inputs: Capacitive touchscreen, QWERTY keyboard, virtual keyboard

The Motorola Charm is a smartphone manufactured by Motorola. It was released exclusively to U.S. carrier T-Mobile, and Canadian carrier Telus. The Motorola Charm is the second Motorola Android phone to feature the updated Motoblur UI for Android 2.1.

The Charm's key features are its front-facing QWERTY keyboard, 2.8-inch 320 x 240 touchscreen, 3-megapixel camera with digital zoom, touchpad on rear of phone, and Android HTML WebKit/Flash Lite web browser.

== See also ==
- List of Android smartphones
- Motoblur
