= Committee on Space Research =

Organization

- Abbreviation: COSPAR
- Formation: October 3, 1958; 68 years ago
- Type: International non-governmental organization
- Location: Paris, France
- Region served: Worldwide
- Official language: English, French
- President: Pascale Ehrenfreund
- Executive Director: Dr. Jean-Claude Worms
- Parent organization: International Council for Science
- Website: cosparhq.cnes.fr

The Committee on Space Research (COSPAR) is an international scientific organization established in October 1958 by the International Council of Scientific Unions for global cooperation and coordination in space research and exploration. It is headquartered in Paris, France.

Among COSPAR's objectives are the promotion of scientific research in space on an international level, with emphasis on the free exchange of results, information, and opinions, and providing a forum, open to all scientists, for the discussion of problems that may affect space research. These objectives are achieved through the organization of symposia, publication, and other means.

COSPAR has created a number of research programmes on different topics, a few in cooperation with other scientific Unions. The long-term project COSPAR international reference atmosphere started in 1960; since then it has produced several editions of the high-atmosphere code CIRA. The code "IRI" of the URSI-COSPAR working group on the International Reference Ionosphere was first edited in 1978 and is updated annually.

== General Assembly ==
From 1958 to 1979, the COSPAR called for the General Assembly (also called the Scientific Assembly) annually. Starting in 1980, the General Assembly is held every two years. These are conferences currently gathering around 3,000 participating space researchers from all over the world, such as Algeria, Argentina, Australia, Austria, Belgium, Brazil, Canada, Chile, China, Denmark, Egypt, Finland, France, Germany, India, Iran, Iraq, Israel, Italy, Japan, Kazakhstan, South Korea, Malaysia, Mexico, Morocco, the Netherlands, Pakistan, Poland, Russia, Saudi Arabia, Singapore, South Africa, Spain, Sweden, Thailand, Turkey, Ukraine, the United Arab Emirates, the United Kingdom and the United States. The assemblies are listed in the table below; as of two previous leap years, two General Assemblies were cancelled. The 41st General Assembly in Istanbul was cancelled due to the 2016 Turkish coup d'état attempt, while the 43rd General Assembly in Sydney was also cancelled due to the COVID-19 pandemic.

General Assembly	Year	Place	Country
58th	2050	TBD	
57th	2048	TBD	
56th	2046	TBD	
55th	2044	TBD	
54th	2042	TBD	
53rd	2040	TBD	
52nd	2038	TBD	
51st	2036	TBD	
50th	2034	TBD	
49th	2032	TBD	
48th	2030	TBD	
47th	2028	Dubai	United Arab Emirates
46th	2026	Florence	Italy
45th	2024	Busan	South Korea
44th	2022	Athens	Greece
43rd	2020	Sydney (cancelled)	Australia
42nd	2018	Pasadena	United States
41st	2016	Istanbul (cancelled)	Turkey
40th	2014	Moscow	Russia
39th	2012	Mysore	India
38th	2010	Bremen	Germany
37th	2008	Montreal	Canada
36th	2006	Beijing	China
35th	2004	Paris	France
34th	2002	Houston	United States
33rd	2000	Warsaw	Poland
32nd	1998	Nagoya	Japan
31st	1996	Birmingham	United Kingdom
30th	1994	Hamburg	Germany
29th	1992	Washington, D.C.	United States
28th	1990	The Hague	Netherlands
27th	1988	Espoo	Finland
26th	1986	Toulouse	France
25th	1984	Graz	Austria
24th	1982	Ottawa	Canada
23rd	1980	Budapest	Hungary
22nd	1979	Bangalore	India
21st	1978	Innsbruck	Austria
20th	1977	Tel Aviv	Israel
19th	1976	Philadelphia	United States
18th	1975	Varna	Bulgaria
17th	1974	São Paulo	Brazil
16th	1973	Konstanz	Germany
15th	1972	Madrid	Spain
14th	1971	Seattle	United States
13th	1970	Leningrad	Soviet Union
12th	1969	Prague	Czechoslovakia
11th	1968	Tokyo	Japan
10th	1967	London	United Kingdom
9th	1966	Vienna	Austria
8th	1965	Mar del Plata	Argentina
7th	1964	Florence	Italy
6th	1963	Warsaw	Poland
5th	1962	Washington, D.C.	United States
4th	1961	Florence	Italy
3rd	1960	Nice	France
2nd	1959	The Hague	Netherlands
1st	1958	London	United Kingdom

== Scientific Structure ==
=== Scientific Commissions ===
Scientific Commission A
Space Studies of the Earth's Surface, Meteorology and Climate

- Task Group on GEO
- Subcommission A1 on Atmosphere, Meteorology and Climate
- Subcommission A2 on Ocean Dynamics, Productivity and the Cryosphere
- Subcommission A3 on Land Processes and Morphology

Scientific Commission B
Space Studies of the Earth-Moon System, Planets, and Small Bodies of the Solar System

- Sub-Commission B1 on Small Bodies
- Sub-Commission B2 on International Coordination of Space Techniques for Geodesy (a joint Sub-Commission with IUGG/IAG Commission I on Reference Frames)
- Sub-Commission B3 on The Moon
- Sub-Commission B4 on Terrestrial Planets
- Sub-Commission B5 on Outer Planets and Satellites
- Sub-Commission B6/E4 on Exoplanets Detection, Characterization and Modelling

Scientific Commission C
Space Studies of the Upper Atmospheres of the Earth and Planets Including Reference Atmospheres

- Sub-Commission C1 on The Earth's Upper Atmosphere and Ionosphere
- Sub-Commission C2 on The Earth's Middle Atmosphere and Lower Ionosphere
- Sub-Commission C3 on Planetary Atmospheres and Aeronomy
  - Task Group on Reference Atmospheres of Planets and Satellites (RAPS)
  - URSI/COSPAR Task Group on the International Reference Ionosphere (IRI)
  - COSPAR/URSI Task Group on Reference Atmospheres, including ISO WG4 (CIRA)
- Sub-Commission C5/D4 on Theory and Observations of Active Experiments

Scientific Commission D
Space Plasmas in the Solar System, Including Planetary Magnetospheres

- Sub-Commission D1 on The Heliosphere
- Sub-Commission D2/E3 on The Transition from the Sun to the Heliosphere
- Sub-Commission D3 on Magnetospheres
- Sub-Commission C5/D4 on Theory and Observations of Active Experiments

Scientific Commission E
Research in Astrophysics from Space

- Sub-Commission E1 on Galactic and Extragalactic Astrophysics
- Sub-Commission E2 on The Sun as a Star
- Sub-Commission D2/E3 on The Transition from the Sun to the Heliosphere
- Sub-Commission B6/E4 on Exoplanets Detection, Characterization and Modelling

Scientific Commission F
Life Sciences as Related to Space

- Sub-Commission F1 on Gravitational and Space Biology
- Sub-Commission F2 on Radiation Environment, Biology and Health
- Sub-Commission F3 on Astrobiology
- Sub-Commission F4 on Natural and Artificial Ecosystems
- Sub-Commission F5 on Gravitational Physiology in Space

Scientific Commission G
Materials Sciences in Space

Scientific Commission H
Fundamental Physics in Space

=== Panels ===
- Technical Panel on Satellite Dynamics (PSD)
- Panel on Technical Problems Related to Scientific Ballooning (PSB)
- Panel on Potentially Environmentally Detrimental Activities in Space (PEDAS)
- Panel on Radiation Belt Environment Modelling (PRBEM)
- Panel on Space Weather (PSW)
- Panel on Planetary Protection (PPP)
- Panel on Capacity Building (PCB)
- Panel on Capacity Building Fellowship Program and Alumni (PCB FP)
- Panel on Education (PE)
- Panel on Exploration (PEX)
- Panel on Interstellar Research (PIR)
- Task Group on Establishing an international Constellation of Small Satellites (TGCSS)
  - Sub-Group on Radiation Belts (TGCSS-SGRB)
- Panel on Social Sciences and Humanities (PSSH)
- Panel on Innovative Solutions (PoIS)
- Task Group on Establishing an International Geospace Systems Program (TGIGSP)

== Planetary Protection Policy ==
Responding to concerns raised in the scientific community that spaceflight missions to the Moon and other celestial bodies might compromise their future scientific exploration, in 1958 the International Council of Scientific Unions (ICSU) established an ad-hoc Committee on Contamination by Extraterrestrial Exploration (CETEX) to provide advice on these issues. A year later, the mandate was transferred to the newly founded Committee on Space Research (COSPAR), which as an interdisciplinary scientific committee of the ICSU (now the International Science Council - ISC) was considered to be the appropriate place to continue the work of CETEX. Since that time, COSPAR has provided an international forum to discuss such matters under the terms “planetary quarantine” and later “planetary protection”, and has formulated a COSPAR planetary protection policy with associated implementation requirements as an international standard to protect against interplanetary biological and organic contamination, and after 1967 as a guide to compliance with Article IX of the United Nations Outer Space Treaty in that area.

The COSPAR Planetary Protection Policy, and its associated requirements, is not legally binding under international law, but it is an internationally agreed standard with implementation guidelines for compliance with Article IX of the Outer Space Treaty. States Parties to the Outer Space Treaty are responsible for national space activities under Article VI of this Treaty, including the activities of governmental and non-governmental entities. It is the State that ultimately will be held responsible for wrongful acts committed by its jurisdictional subjects.

Updating the COSPAR Planetary Protection Policy, either as a response to new discoveries or based on specific requests, is a process that involves appointed members of the COSPAR Panel on Planetary Protection who represent, on the one hand, their national or international authority responsible for compliance with the United Nations Outer Space Treaty of 1967, and, on the other hand, COSPAR Scientific Commissions B – Space Studies of the Earth-Moon System, Planets and Small Bodies of the Solar Systems, and F - Life Sciences as Related to Space. After reaching a consensus among the involved parties, the proposed recommendation for updating the Policy is formulated by the COSPAR Panel on Planetary Protection and submitted to the COSPAR Bureau for review and approval.

The new structure of the Panel and its work was described in recent publications.

The recently updated COSPAR Policy on Planetary Protection was published in the August 2020 issue of COSPAR's journal Space Research Today. It contains some updates with respect to the previously approved version based on recommendations formulated by the Panel and approved by the COSPAR Bureau.

== Member countries ==
As of today, the Committee on Space Research features more than 50 countries as its member countries:

- Algeria
- Argentina
- Armenia
- Australia
- Austria
- Belgium
- Brazil
- Bulgaria
- Canada
- Chile
- China
- Czech Republic
- Denmark
- Egypt
- Finland
- France
- Germany
- Greece
- Hungary
- India
- Indonesia
- Iran
- Iraq
- Israel
- Italy
- Japan
- Kazakhstan
- South Korea
- Malaysia
- Mexico
- Morocco
- Netherlands
- Nigeria
- Norway
- Pakistan
- Poland
- Portugal
- Romania
- Russia
- Saudi Arabia
- Singapore
- Slovakia
- South Africa
- Spain
- Sweden
- Switzerland
- Taiwan
- Thailand
- Turkey
- Ukraine
- United Arab Emirates
- United Kingdom
- United States

== See also ==
- Space research
- Planetary protection, for other bodies and Earth
- International Planetary Data Alliance
- List of government space agencies
