= Motorola Atrix 2 =

Android smartphone developed by Motorola Mobility

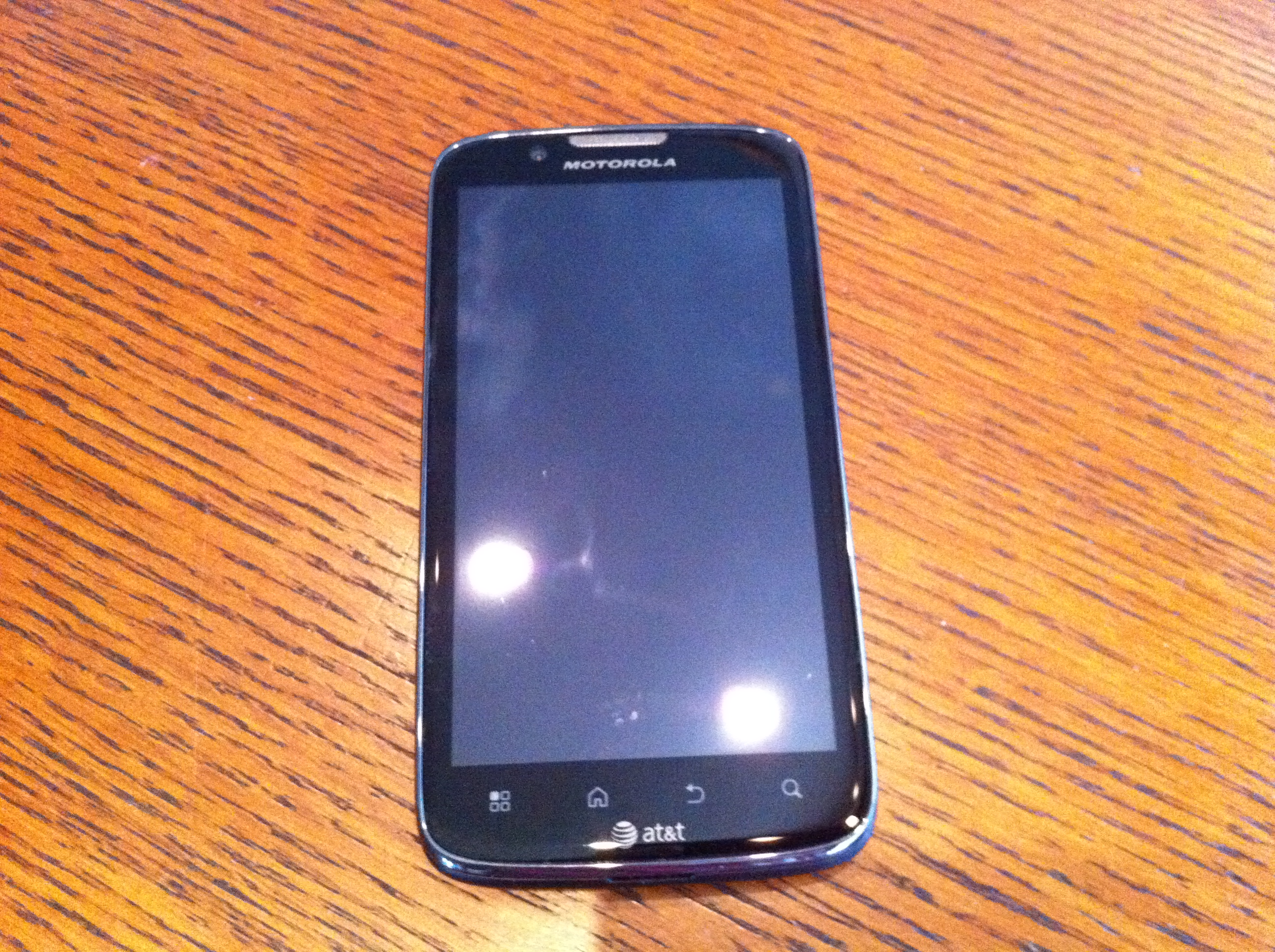
- Brand: Motorola
- Series: Atrix
- First released: October 16, 2011
- Predecessor: Motorola Atrix 4G
- Successor: Motorola Atrix HD
- Related: Droid Bionic
- Compatible networks: AT&T
- Form factor: Touchscreen smartphone
- Operating system: Android 2.3 initial release, upgradable to 4.0.4
- System-on-chip: TI OMAP4430
- CPU: Dual-core 1.2 GHz Cortex-A9
- GPU: PowerVR SGX540
- Memory: 1 GB
- Storage: 8 GB
- Removable storage: 2 GB, expandable to 32 GB
- Battery: 1785 mAh
- Rear camera: 8 MP (3264x2448) with Flash
- Front camera: VGA
- Display: 960 × 540
- Connectivity: HSDPA+, HSUPA, WiFi 802.11b/g/n, Bluetooth 2.1+EDR

The Motorola Atrix 2 is a high-end Android-based smartphone by Motorola. Originally announced on October 11, 2011, it is the successor to the Atrix 4G. This phone was succeeded by the Motorola Atrix HD.

== Features ==
The Motorola Atrix 2 has a one-gigahertz dual-core Texas Instruments OMAP processor with 1 GB of RAM and 8 GB of internal storage. It has a 4.3" display with a resolution of 960 x 540. Unlike its predecessor, the Atrix 2 does not use the PenTile matrix. The phone runs Android 2.3 . On October 9, 2012, an OTA update to Android 4.0.4 was released in the United States. The phone supports AT&T's HSPA+ network.

== Webtop ==
Similarly to the Atrix 4G, the Atrix 2 features Motorola's Webtop software, which allows the use of an Ubuntu-based desktop environment to browse the internet using Firefox, manage files, and access applications on the phone itself through a Mobile View window.

Upon the upgrade to Android 4.0, the Webtop mode was changed to use Android's built-in interface for tablets instead of a separate operating system environment, allowing direct use of apps already present on the device (which sometimes offer layouts optimized for larger displays).

== See also ==
- Motorola Atrix 4G
- Droid Bionic, a similar phone by Motorola
- List of Android smartphones
