= Samsung Galaxy R =

Android smartphone by Samsung

Samsung Galaxy R GT-I9103
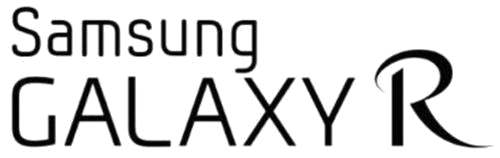
- Manufacturer: Samsung Electronics
- Type: Touchscreen smartphone
- Successor: Samsung Galaxy R Style
- Related: Samsung Galaxy S II
- Dimensions: 125.3 mm (4.93 in) H 66.1 mm (2.60 in) W 9.5 mm (0.37 in) D
- Weight: 135 g (4.8 oz)
- Operating system: Original: Android 2.3.5 "Gingerbread" with TouchWiz UI 4.0; Current: Android 4.0.4 "Ice Cream Sandwich"; Unofficial: Android 4.4 "KitKat" via OmniROM
- CPU: 1 GHz dual-core Nvidia Tegra 250 AP20H SoC processor Ventana
- GPU: GeForce ultra-low power (ULP)
- Memory: 1 GB RAM
- Storage: 8 GB flash memory
- Removable storage: microSD (up to 32 GB)
- Battery: Li-Ion 1650 mAh
- Rear camera: 5 MP with auto focus, 720p 30 fps HD video recording and stills. Single LED flash.
- Front camera: 1.3 MP for video chatting, video recording (VGA), and stills
- Display: 800×480 px, 10.8 cm (4.27 in) at 218 ppi WVGA Super CLEAR (LCD)
- Connectivity: 3.5 mm TRRS; Wi-Fi (802.11a/b/g/n); Wi-Fi Direct; Bluetooth 3.0; Micro USB 2.0; DLNA;
- Data inputs: Multi-touch touch screen, headset controls, proximity and ambient light sensors, 3-axis gyroscope, magnetometer, accelerometer, aGPS, and stereo FM-radio
- SAR: Head: 0.26 W/kg 1 g Body: 0.42 W/kg 1 g Hotspot: 0.417 W/kg 1 g
- Other: Exchange ActiveSync, integrated messaging Social Hub, Readers Hub, Music Hub, and Game Hub

The Samsung Galaxy R (Royal) (GT-I9103) is an Android smartphone sold by Samsung. It was a variant of the Samsung Galaxy S II. The Galaxy R launched in Europe, and then Asia. By August 2011, it was available in Sweden. The Galaxy R was launched in September 2011 in Taiwan.

== Hardware ==
=== Processor ===
Nvidia's Tegra 2 System on a chip (SoC) uses Nvidia's own GeForce ultra-low power (ULP) for its GPU.

Nvidia's Tegra 2 supports the Tegra Zone application and service which is intended to give Android users an enhanced gaming experience by allowing users to download games that have been well optimized for Tegra 2 powered devices. This has been marketed as "console-quality gaming" by Nvidia. Tegra 2 also features support for hardware acceleration for Flash and JavaScript within websites, and is one of the first SoCs to be natively supported by Android 3.0 "Honeycomb".

=== Memory ===
The Galaxy R features 1 GB of dedicated RAM and 8 GB of internal mass storage. Within the battery compartment there is an external dedicated microSDHC card slot.

=== Display ===
The Samsung Galaxy R uses a 108.5-millimetre (4.27 in) WVGA Super CLEAR LCD (SC-LCD) capacitive touchscreen. It has a 4.2" 16 million color screen, without using the Pentile matrix.

=== Camera ===
On the back of the device is a 5-megapixel camera with single LED flash that can record videos in high-definition 720p. There is also a fixed-focus front-facing 1.3-megapixel camera for video calling, taking photos as well as general video recording. The video recording has been criticized for the lack of focus.

=== Connectivity ===
- GPRS: Class 33
- EDGE: Class 33
- HSDPA: 21 Mbit/s
- HSUPA (5.76 Mbit/s)
- WLAN: Wi-Fi (802.11 b/g/n)
- Wi-Fi Direct
- Wi-Fi hotspot
- DLNA
- Bluetooth (v3.0 with A2DP)
- EDR
- USB (microUSB v2.0)

== Software ==
=== Android 2.3 and 4.0 ===
The Galaxy R ships with Android 2.3.4 "Gingerbread" installed. An Android 4.0 "Ice Cream Sandwich" update for the Galaxy R was released in August 2012.

=== After-market development ===
Android Jelly Bean 4.1, 4.2 and 4.3

Official CyanogenMod CM 10.1 (Android 4.2) and PAC man ROM (Android 4.2) firmware releases are available for Galaxy R.

Unofficial CM 10 (Android 4.1) and CM 10.2 (Android 4.3) is available for download at xda-developers.com. Many other unofficial custom ROMs: Paranoid Android, AOSP, MIUI, JellyBAM, Carbon ROM, Vanilla Rootbox, JellyBeer, Avatar, Resurrection Remix, LiquidSmooth, to name a few, are also available for download.

Android KitKat 4.4

Official OmniROM 4.4 was released for the Samsung Galaxy R and is available for download in the OmniROM website.

Unofficial builds of CyanogenMod CM 11 and CarbonRom 4.4 are also available for download.

=== User interface ===
The phone employs the latest proprietary Samsung TouchWiz 4.0 user interface.

=== Bundled applications ===
Four new Samsung 'Hub' applications were revealed at the 2011 Mobile World Congress for the Galaxy S II and the Galaxy R includes the same:

Social Hub
Which integrates popular social networking services like Facebook and Twitter into one place rather than in separate applications.
Readers Hub
This hub provides the ability to access, read and download online newspapers, ebooks and magazines from a worldwide selection.
Music Hub
An application store for downloading and purchasing music tracks on the device. Samsung has teamed up with 7digital to offer this service.
Game Hub
An application store for downloading and purchasing games. Samsung has teamed up with partners including Gameloft to offer this service.
Other applications
More applications include Kies 2.0, Kies Air, AllShare (for DLNA), Voice Recognition, Google Voice Translation, Google Maps with Latitude, Places, Navigation (beta) and Lost Phone Management, Adobe Flash 10.2, Polaris Office application and 'QuickType' by SWYPE.

=== Media support ===
The Galaxy R supports various audio formats including MP3, OGG, AAC, AAC+, eAAC+, AMR-NB, AMR-WB, WMA, WAV, MID, AC3, IMY, FLAC, XMF audio formats and video formats support for MPEG4, H.264, H.263, WMV, DivX, Xvid, VC-1. Recording & Playback in up to 720p HD video files. Unlike the Exynos 4210 found in the Galaxy S II, the Tegra 2 has been found to not support 'high-profile' encoded h.264 video. A recent kernel for ICS (developed by a xda developer) also enabled the mobile to support HDMI output support via micro USB to MHL cable.

== See also ==
Other phones with Tegra 2 SoC:

- LG Optimus 2X
- Motorola Atrix
- Motorola Photon
- Droid X2
