= Samsung Galaxy R Style =

Discontinued Samsung Android phone

- Brand: Samsung
- Manufacturer: Samsung Electronics
- Type: Touchscreen Smartphone
- First released: May 31, 2012
- Predecessor: Samsung Galaxy R
- Successor: Samsung Galaxy Grand
- Compatible networks: Wi-Fi a/b/g/n (2.4/5.0 GHz); A-GPS, NFC, DLNA, Bluetooth 4.0; 850/900 MHz / 1.8/1.9 GHz GSM, GPRS, EDGE, UMTS, WCDMA, HSDPA, HSUPA, LTE
- Weight: 127 g (4 oz)
- Operating system: Original: Android 4.0 "Ice Cream Sandwich"; Current: Android 4.1.2 "Jelly Bean"
- System-on-chip: Qualcomm Snapdragon S4 MSM8960
- CPU: Dual-core Krait @ 1.5 GHz
- GPU: Adreno 225 @ 400 MHz
- Memory: 1 GB RAM
- Storage: 16 GB
- Removable storage: microSD, up to 32GB
- Battery: Removable Li-Ion 2000 mAh battery
- Rear camera: 5 MP
- Front camera: 1.3 MP
- Display: 4.3 in AMOLED
- Connectivity: USB 2.0 / HDMI / MHL Micro 5 pin integrated terminal 3.5 mm American TRRS (4 pole)

Samsung Galaxy R Style is an Android smartphone developed by Samsung Electronics. Released in May 2012, it ran on Android 4.0.3 "Ice Cream Sandwich".

== Specifications ==
=== Software ===
Samsung Galaxy R Style came with Android 4.0.3 "Ice Cream Sandwich", but could later be upgraded to 4.1.2 "Jelly Bean".

=== Hardware ===
Samsung Galaxy R Style has a 4.3 inch display. The rear and front facing cameras are 5 and 1.3 MP, respectively. It comes with a Dual-core 1.5 GHz Krait CPU and an Adreno GPU. It has a removable 2000 mAh Lithium-ion battery. Internal storage for the device was 16 GB, and could be expanded via microSD, providing up to an additional 32 GB of storage. It also had 1 GB of RAM.

== History ==
Samsung Galaxy R Style was announced in early 2012 and released on 31st of the same year in South Korea. It has since been discontinued.

== See also ==
- Samsung Galaxy
