= Planetary Science Archive =

Central repository for all scientific & engineering data

The Planetary Science Archive is the central repository for all scientific and engineering data returned by the European Space Agency's Solar System missions, such as Giotto, Huygens, Mars Express, Rosetta, SMART-1, and Venus Express, as well as several ground-based cometary observations. It uses NASA's Planetary Data System standards as a baseline for the formatting and structure of all data contained within the archive. The data sets are peer reviewed and undergo an additional internal validation procedure.

All data on the Planetary Science Archive are free to download and use. The principal investigator(s) as well as the European Space Agency Planetary Science Archive have to be acknowledged when making a publication using the downloaded data.
