= Planetary Data System =

Data archive for NASA solar system missions

Planetary Data System (PDS)
- Abbreviation: PDS
- Type: Distributed data system
- Location: United States
- Parent organization: NASA Headquarters' Planetary Sciences Division

The Planetary Data System (PDS) is a distributed data system that NASA uses to archive data collected by Solar System missions.

The PDS is an active archive that makes available well documented, peer-reviewed planetary data to the research community. The data comes from orbital, landed and robotic missions and ground-based support data associated with those missions. It is managed by NASA Headquarters' Planetary Sciences Division.

== PDS archiving philosophy ==
The main objective of the PDS is to maintain a planetary data archive that will withstand the test of time such that future generations of scientists can access, understand and use preexisting planetary data. The PDS tries to ensure compatibility of the archive by adhering to strict standards of storage media, archiving formats, and required documentation.

=== Storage media ===
One critical component of the PDS archive is the storage media. The data must be stored effectively and efficiently with no degradation of the data over the archive's lifespan. Therefore, the physical media must have large capacity and must remain readable over many years. PDS is migrating toward electronic storage as its "standard" media.

=== Archiving formats ===
The format of the data is also important. In general, transparent, non-proprietary formats are best. When a proprietary format is submitted to the archive (such as a Microsoft Word document) an accompanying plain text file is also required. It is assumed that the scientists of the future will at least be able to make sense of regular ASCII bytes even if the proprietary software and support ceases to exist. PDS allows figures and illustrations to be included in the archive as individual images. PDS adheres to many other standards including, but not limited to, special directory and file naming conventions and label requirements. Each file in the PDS archive is accompanied by a searchable label (attached or detached) that describes the file content.

=== Archiving documents ===
The archive must be complete and be able to stand alone. There is no guarantee that the people who originally worked with and submitted the data to the archive will be available in the future to field questions regarding the data, its calibration or the mission. Therefore, the archive must include good descriptive documentation of how the spacecraft and its instruments worked, how the data were collected and calibrated, and what the data mean. The quality of the documentation is examined during a mission independent PDS peer review.

== Nodes ==
The PDS is composed of 8 nodes, 6 science discipline nodes and 2 support nodes. In addition, there are several subnodes and data nodes whose exact status tends to change over time.

=== Science discipline nodes ===
- Atmospheres Node – handles non-imaging atmospheric data (New Mexico State University)
- Geosciences Node – handles data of the surfaces and interiors of terrestrial planetary bodies (Washington University in St. Louis)
- Cartography and Imaging Science Node – archives many of the larger planetary image data collections (Astrogeology Research Program of the United States Geological Survey, and Jet Propulsion Laboratory)
- Planetary Plasma Interaction (PPI) Node – handles data consisting of the interaction between the solar wind and planetary winds with planetary magnetospheres, ionospheres and surfaces (University of California, Los Angeles)
- Ring-Moon Systems Node – handles archiving, cataloging, and distributing planetary data of ring systems, moons, and planets (SETI Institute)
- Small Bodies Node (SBN) – handles asteroid, comet and planetary dust data (University of Maryland, College Park)
  - Comet Subnode (University of Maryland, College Park)
  - Asteroid/Interplanetary Dust Subnode (Planetary Science Institute)

=== Support nodes ===
- Engineering Node – provides systems engineering support to the PDS (Jet Propulsion Laboratory)
- Navigation and Ancillary Information Facility (NAIF) Node – maintains the SPICE information system (Jet Propulsion Laboratory)

== Organizational structure ==
The PDS is divided into a number of science discipline "nodes" which are individually curated by planetary scientists.

The PDS Management Council serves as the technical policy board of the PDS, and provides findings for NASA with respect to planetary science data management, ensures coordination among the nodes, guarantees responsiveness to customer needs, and monitors the appropriate uses of evolving information technologies that may make PDS tasks both more efficient and more cost effective. It is formed by the principal investigators of the science discipline nodes, along with the leaders of the Technical Support Nodes, the Project Manager, and Deputy Project Manager.

The Solar System Exploration Data Services Office at the Goddard Space Flight Center handles PDS Project Management.

== Roadmap 2017–2026 ==
NASA and the PDS recently engaged in development of a Roadmap for the period 2017 to 2026. The purpose of the roadmap effort was to outline a strategy for moving forward in planetary data archiving under the auspices of a rapidly growing data volume (nearly 1 petabyte at present), new computing capabilities, tools, and facilities, and a growing community of planetary science investigators.

== See also ==
- ESA Planetary Science Archive
- International Planetary Data Alliance (IPDA)
- NASA Astrophysics Data System (ADS)
- NASA Spacecraft Planet Instrument C-matrix Events (SPICE)
- NASA/IPAC Extragalactic Database (NED)
- Parameter Value Language (markup language)
- SIMBAD
