= Motorola Xoom =

Android tablet developed by Motorola Mobility

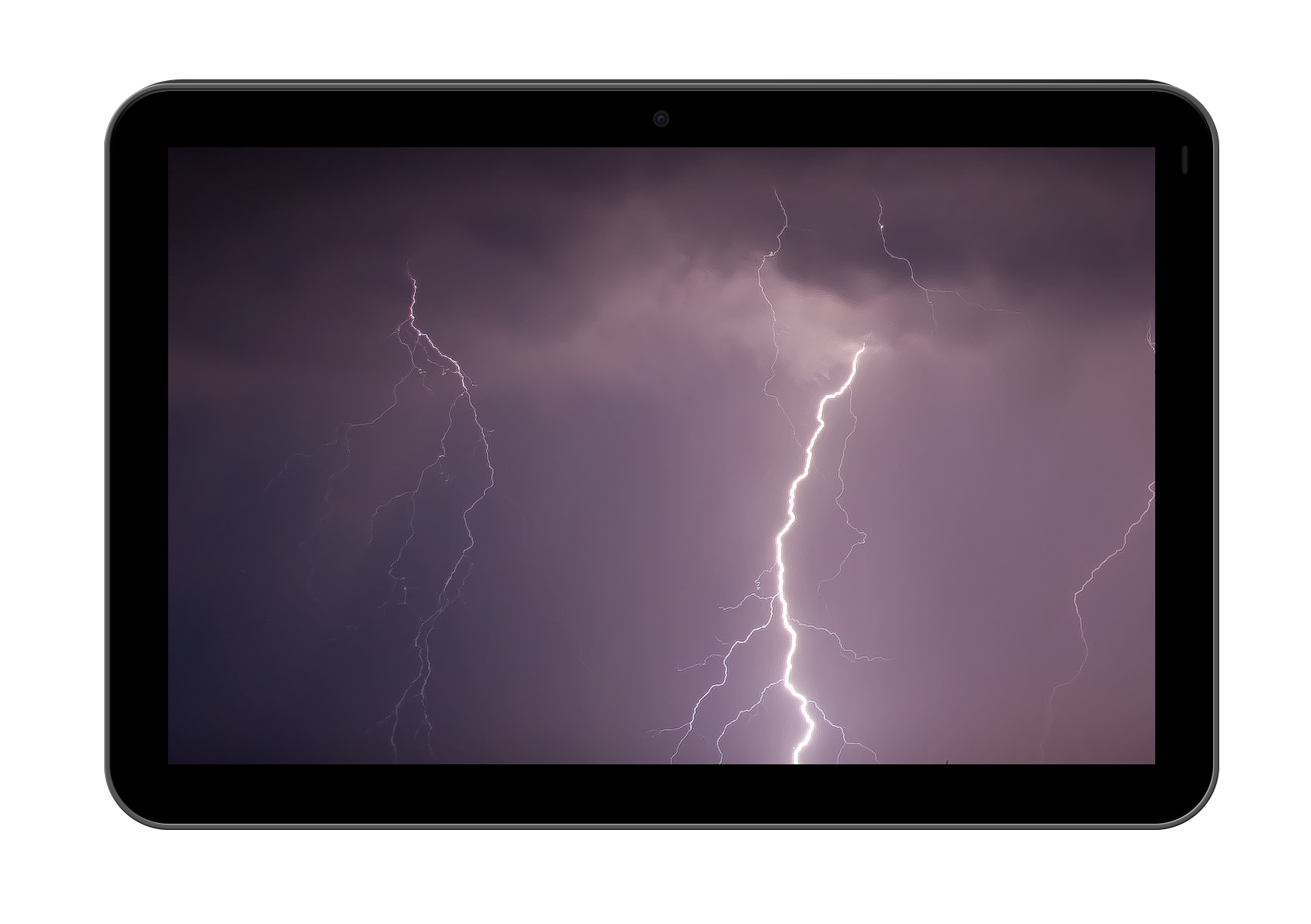
- Manufacturer: Motorola Mobility
- Type: Tablet
- Released: February 24, 2011
- Introductory price: $799 GSM and CDMA $499, £399 Wi-Fi only $299 Australian
- Operating system: Android 3.0 Honeycomb; Upgradable to Android 4.1.2 "Jelly Bean"
- CPU: Nvidia Tegra 2 T20, 1 GHz dual-core processor
- Memory: 1 GB DDR2 SDRAM
- Storage: Internal memory: 32 GB; External slot: SDHC microSD card after SW update
- Display: 1280×800 px, aspect ratio 16:10, 10.1 in (260 mm) diagonal, ~46 in^{2} (~300 cm^{2}), 160 ppi, Gorilla Glass
- Graphics: Tegra 2 T20, ULP GeForce 333 MHz o/c to 400 MHz
- Sound: Stereo
- Input: Multi-touch capacitive touchscreen display; Ambient light sensors; Microphone; Barometer; Magnetometer-compass; S-GPS; 3-axis accelerometer, gyroscope
- Camera: Back: 5.0 MP with 8× digital zoom, autofocus, 720p video capture, 30 fps, dual LED flash Front: 2.0 MP camera
- Connectivity: Bluetooth 2.1 + EDR, Class 2; micro-HDMI 1.4 (type D), 720p (out); Micro-USB 2.0; Wi-Fi 802.11a/b/g/n; CDMA version: EVDO Rev. A LTE GSM version: GSM/EDGE Class 12 UMTS/HSDPA
- Power: 6500 mAh
- Dimensions: 249.1 mm (9.81 in) H 167.8 mm (6.61 in) W 12.9 mm (0.51 in) D
- Weight: 708 g (25.0 oz) Wi-Fi; 730 g (26 oz) 3G/4G
- Successor: Motorola Xyboard
- Website: www.motorola.com/xoom

The Motorola Xoom is an Android-based tablet computer by Motorola, introduced at CES 2011 on January 5, 2011. It was the first tablet to be sold with Android Honeycomb. The Motorola Xoom went through the FCC on February 10, 2011 only 14 days before release. The 3G version was released on February 24, 2011, and the Wi-Fi version was released March 27, 2011. It was announced concurrently with three other products: the Motorola Atrix 4G, the Motorola Droid Bionic, and the Motorola Cliq 2. CNET named it the "Best of the CES" 2011.

Its successor, the Motorola Xyboard, Xoom 2 in the UK, was announced in October 2011, and released in November.

== Features ==
The Xoom supports up to 720p video playback. It features a 2 MP front-facing camera for video chatting over Wi-Fi or cellular Internet and a rear-facing 5 MP camera that records 720p video. The Xoom has a 1280×800-pixel, 10.1-inch widescreen display and 3D graphics acceleration, as well as HDMI-out. It features the Gorilla Glass resistant coating.

It includes a variety of sensors, including a gyroscope, magnetometer, accelerometer, and a barometer. The Xoom uses an Nvidia Tegra 2 SoC T20 chip.

The Xoom reportedly has trouble trying to communicate with the Windows XP operating system via USB cable unless Windows Media Player is updated past version 10. This issue is not present in Windows 7.

=== Media ===
The Motorola Xoom supports the following formats:

- Audio: AAC, AAC+, AMR NB, AMRWB, MP3, and XMF
- Video: H.263, H.264 (Baseline Profile), MPEG4, and VP8

=== Software ===
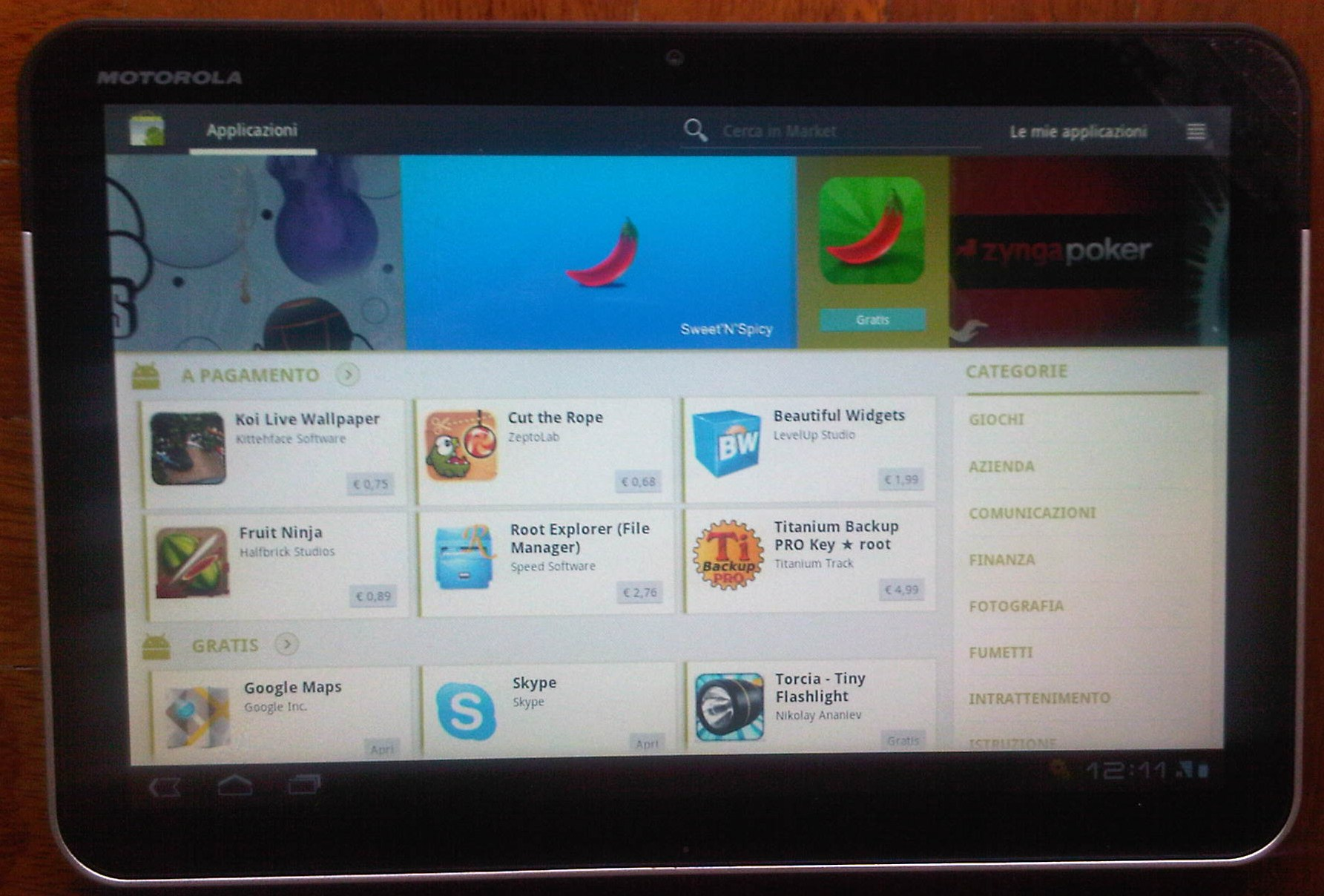
Italian Motorola Xoom with Android Market

The Motorola Xoom was the first device to run Google's tablet specific OS, Android 3.0 Honeycomb, which introduced new features including a redesigned, tablet-optimized user interface, a 3D desktop purportedly taken from BumpTop (which Google acquired in April 2010), improved task-switching, a newly redesigned notification system, Google Maps 5 in 3D and browser enhancements including tabbed browsing, form auto-fill and bookmark syncing.

The Canadian Wi-Fi Xoom currently has the 4.0.3 update (and will not get any future updates) and the UK Wi-Fi Xoom had the 3.2 update as of July 2012. On February 23, Motorola Mobility announced that the Motorola Xoom would break its policy of locking down its devices by providing the gadget with an "unlockable/relockable bootloader that will enable developers to access hardware for development."

After Google released the source code to Android 4.0 "Ice Cream Sandwich", Motorola announced that a number of its formerly released mobile devices would get the update, including the Xoom. The Android 4.0.3 update for the Wi-Fi Xoom was released in the US on January 18, 2012. The corresponding update to the Verizon-branded Xoom was released on June 4, 2012.

On June 27, 2012 at the Google I/O conference, it was announced that the Xoom would be one of the first devices to receive an upgrade to Android 4.1 "Jelly Bean", along with the Nexus S and Galaxy Nexus, beginning by the middle of July 2012. The corresponding update to the Verizon Wireless-branded Xoom 4G was released in August 2013.

=== Accessories ===
The Motorola Xoom supports docking stations for charging and as a stand for viewing video. It also features Bluetooth keyboard support.

Available accessories include the Motorola Xoom portfolio case, dock, HD stereo dock and wireless keyboard.

It was announced that the microSD Card slot would be enabled with the Android 3.2 update. The tablet did not support Flash on its initial release. Before release, no official statement indicated whether the microSD slot would support SDHC or SDXC cards. Early on Motorola also touted the ability to upgrade to 4G as a major selling point versus other tablets. However, it was revealed through a leaked internal memo in late July 2011, that the upgrade would not be available until at least September 2011. Many early adopters to the Xoom tablet were upset that the upgrade will not be available more than 6 months after Xoom's debut.

On September 29, 2011 Verizon Wireless began the 4G upgrade process. This upgrade takes approximately six days. Starting October 11, 2011, Verizon began selling the Xoom with 4G pre-installed.

== Super Bowl commercial ==
Motorola aired a television spot during Super Bowl XLV (45) in 2011 that was designed as a satire of Apple's landmark Super Bowl ad "1984". Titled "Empower the People", it depicted a dystopia in which all of humanity wears white hoodies and are plugged into iPods, a jab at how Apple products had achieved cult-like status and practically ubiquitous market penetration.

The following week, a minor controversy erupted when Los Angeles filmmaker Mike Sarrow claimed that he had, in fact, originated the commercial's idea first. In 2009, he shot a short film portraying a dystopian world where everyone is plugged into iPods to the point that all human conversation has ceased. The controversy was reported on numerous tech news websites, including CNET and Engadget, though no concrete evidence of intellectual property was presented, merely some suspicious similarities, including a nearly identical ending shot. The filmmaker chose not to pursue Motorola legally, using the similarity only as publicity for his work.

== Reception ==
The device's hardware received praise from reviewers; Engadget, PC World and CNET all said that the Xoom's performance was as good as, or superior to, competing products. The user experience with the installed software was mixed. Android 3.0 was praised for "coming together in a far more cohesive manner than any previous iteration of the software," according to Engadget, and being "the most polished Google software effort to date," according to PC World, as many other Android tablets used Android 2.3 which was designed for smartphones while Android 3.0 was intended for tablets. CNET said that in some areas the software seemed overly complex, and Engadget said that "a lot of the new software feels like it isn't quite out of beta."

The Xoom's initial pricing attracted criticism since it was more expensive than its equivalent iPad 2 model. Both Engadget and PC World cited the price as a drawback, and CNET said that with the launch pricing, "the Xoom's appeal will be limited to early adopters and Android loyalists."

== Sales ==
Xoom was estimated by Deutsche Bank analysts to have sold about 100,000 units during the first 6 weeks of availability. On April 28, 2011, Motorola announced during Q1 2011 earnings conference calls that over 250,000 units of Xoom were shipped to retail channels during the quarter. In July 2011, Motorola lowered the price tag for Xoom Wi-Fi from $600 to $500 and then Xoom 3G from $800 to $600. Motorola revealed through its Q2 2011 earnings report that it shipped 440,000 Xoom units during the prior 3 months. Unit shipment subsequently dropped to 100,000 units in Q3 2011 and rebounded slightly to 200,000 units in Q4 2011. According to a financial statement released on May 1, 2012, Motorola shipped approximately 100,000 units in Q1 2012.

== See also ==
- Comparison of tablet computers
- Android version history
