= Motorola Atrix 4G =

Android smartphone developed by Motorola Mobility

- The Motorola Atrix 4G, with capacitive buttons across the bottom
- Manufacturer: Motorola Mobility
- First released: US: February 22, 2011 CAN: March 17, 2011; KOR: April 3, 2011 UK: May 4, 2011
- Availability by region: US: Q1-2011; CAN: Q1-2011; KOR: Q2-2011; UK: Q2-2011
- Successor: Atrix 2, Atrix HD, Atrix HD LTE
- Form factor: Touchscreen smartphone
- Dimensions: 117.75 mm (4.636 in) H 63.50 mm (2.500 in) W 10.95 mm (0.431 in) D
- Weight: 135 g (4.8 oz)
- Operating system: Android 2.3.4 and 2.3.6 Gingerbread
- System-on-chip: Nvidia Tegra 2
- CPU: 1 GHz dual-core ARM Cortex-A9
- GPU: GeForce ULP
- Memory: 1 GB LPDDR2 RAM
- Storage: 16 GB on board, supports up to 32 GB microSDHC, total 48 GB
- Battery: 1930 mAh Talk time WCDMA = 9 hrs GSM = 8.8 hrs Standby time WCDMA = 350 hrs GSM = 400 hrs
- Rear camera: 5 MP AF, digital zoom with LED Flash; Capture – 720p MPEG4 and H.264 at 30 frame/s (full 1080p to be supported via software upgrade post-launch)
- Front camera: 0.3 MP VGA imager for video chat, self image capture
- Display: 4.0-inch 960×540 px qHD TFT LCD at 275 ppi, 16 M colors, Gorilla Glass
- Connectivity: WiFi 2.4, 5 GHz 802.11 b/g/n Bluetooth 2.1 EDR; WCDMA 850/1900/2100 MHz; GSM 850/900/1800/1900 MHz; HSPA+ at 14.4 Mbit/s audio jack 3.5 mm Micro USB 2.0 HS
- Data inputs: Multi-touch capacitive touchscreen display, accelerometer, magnetometer, ambient light sensor, proximity sensor, fingerprint reader
- Other: Android WebKit with Adobe Flash Player, Mozilla Firefox 3.6.13 in Webtop Application, eCompass, aGPS with Google Maps, Google Street View, Google Latitude, Android Market
- Website: motorola.com at the Wayback Machine (archived 2011-05-01)

The Motorola Atrix 4G (also known as the MB860, ME860 in Asia, or MB861 in Korea) is an Android-based smartphone developed by Motorola, introduced at CES 2011 along with the Motorola Xoom, Motorola Droid Bionic, and Motorola Cliq 2 on January 5, 2011. It was made available in the first quarter of 2011, and was the first Motorola smartphone released after the original company's split into Motorola Mobility and Solutions.

The Atrix 4G uses a NVIDIA Tegra 2 processor, and was the first Android smartphone with 1 gigabyte of RAM, a fingerprint sensor, and a quarter-HD PenTile display with 24-bit graphics. It is also the second smartphone with a dual-core CPU after the LG Optimus 2X.

== Specification highlights ==
- Code name: Olympus
- NVIDIA Tegra 2 (dual-core 1 GHz Cortex A9 + GeForce ULP)
- HSPA+ at 14.4 Mbit/s down (Category 10 HSPDA), 5.76 Mbit/s up (Category 6 HSUPA) where available
- Android 2.2 (Upgradable on most carriers to 2.3 "Gingerbread", upgradable to 4.4.4 "Kitkat" with custom firmware)
- 1 GB LP-DDR2 RAM
- 16 GB Internal memory, expandable by microSDXC 64 GB, total of 80 GB
- 4-inch PenTile qHD display (540 × 960) with Gorilla Glass
- 5.0 MP with dual LED flash, 4× digital zoom and autofocus, 720p video capture at 30 frame/s
  (Full 1080p video capture will be officially supported via software upgrade sometime post-launch, unofficially available since May 15, 2011, via customized package)
- VGA front-facing camera for video calls
- Micro USB
- Micro HDMI (type D)
- 3.5 mm audio jack
- 2nd rear microphone for "uplink" noise reduction
- TriColor LED notification light
- Fingerprint scanner
- 1930 mAh removable Li-Po battery
- 117.75 × 63.50 × 10.95 millimetres (4.636 × 2.500 × 0.431 in)
- 135 grams (4.8 oz)

== Webtop ==
The Atrix 4G was one of the first Motorola devices to ship with its Webtop platform. When the phone is placed into its HD Multimedia Dock or Laptop Dock accessories, the user can access an Ubuntu-based desktop featuring access to the phone and its applications via the Mobile View application, integration of Android notifications into the desktop, multimedia playback through Entertainment Center, file management through Nautilus, and the Firefox web browser (along with support for Prism for the site-specific browsers used on Webtop mode).

In September 2011, Motorola released the source code of the Webtop software on SourceForge.

== Accessories ==
Atrix accessories announced as of October 2011 include:

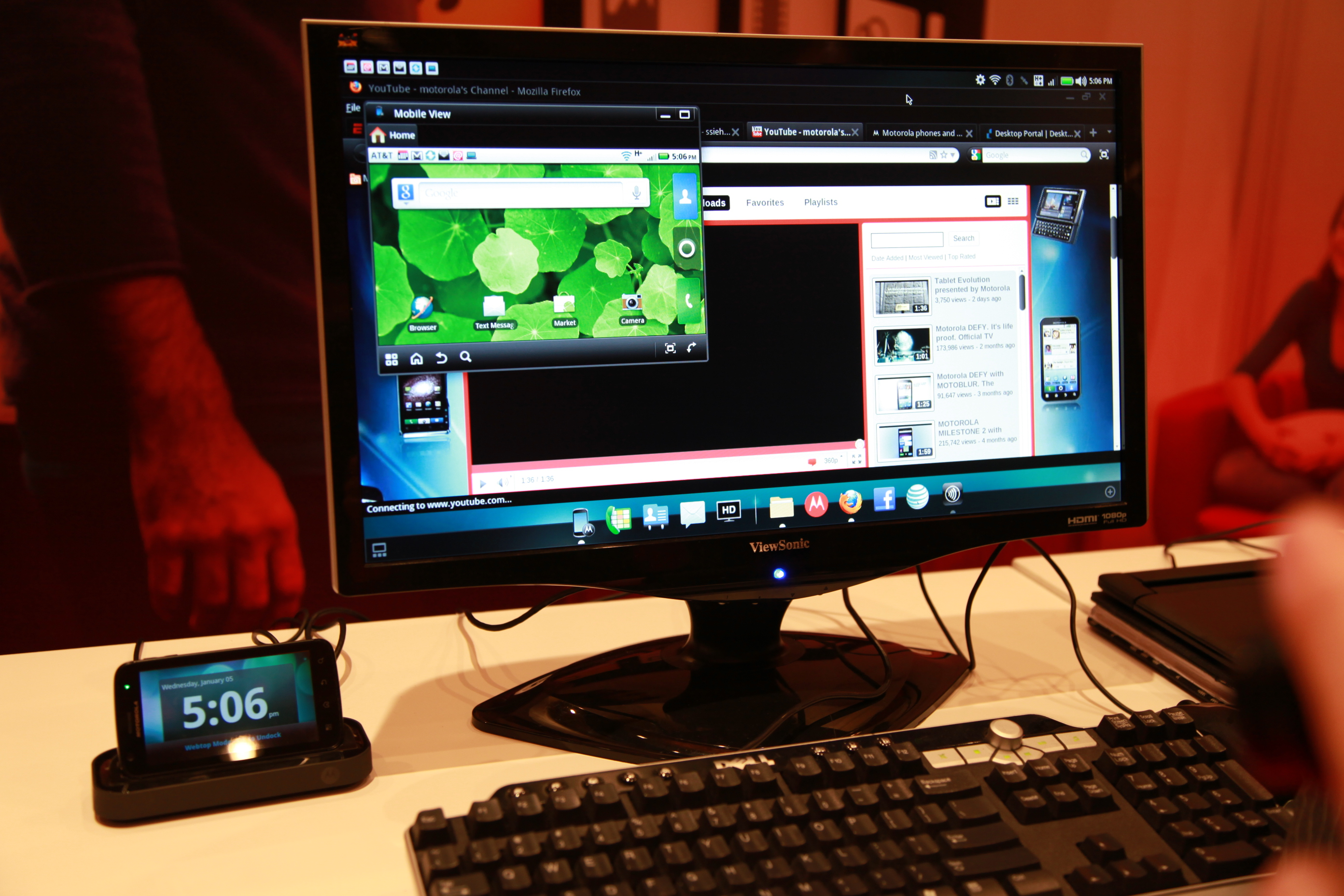
Motorola Atrix in its HD Multimedia dock and its Webtop software on the computer monitor

- Lapdock – Laptop dock
- HD multimedia dock – Desktop dock with HDMI, audio, USB ports, and IR remote control
- Navigation Dock – Vehicle dock
- PowerDock – Standard dock

== Software updates ==
- On April 30, 2011, AT&T issued an update to the Motorola Atrix 4G enabling HSUPA.
- On July 25, 2011, AT&T began rolling out the Android 2.3.4 update to the AT&T-branded Atrix 4G.
- On February 8, 2012, Motorola sent out Android 2.3.6 to 1000 phones for market testing. Only AT&T customers enjoy 2.3.6 version.
- On February 15, 2012, Motorola announced that an upgrade to Ice Cream Sandwich (ICS) would be available in Q3 2012.
- On September 28, 2012, Motorola announced that they would not upgrade the Atrix 4G to Ice Cream Sandwich (ICS) as they had promised, prompting customer outrage.

== Variants ==
In June 2011 Motorola and Sprint announced the release on July 31 of the Motorola Photon 4G, which has a 4.3-inch (110 mm) quarter-HD multi-touch display and a 1 GHz dual-core NVIDIA Tegra 2 processor. It has an 8-megapixel rear-facing camera with 720p recording capabilities, a VGA front-facing camera for video chat and self-portrait pictures, and the Sprint ID customization app.

== FCC approval ==
FCC ID: IHDP56LS1 Approved January 20, 2011

== Reception ==
The Atrix 4G received largely positive reviews from critics. Engadget gave the Atrix 4G a 9 out of 10, commenting on its sound quality and high-resolution display. CNET gave it a 4 out of 5 stars for its sleek design and 5 megapixel camera.

It won the CNET Best of CES 2011 Award in the Smartphone category, the CTIA Emerging Technology (E-Tech) award, and several other awards.

== Development ==
When the Atrix was shipped to AT&T, root access was available, but Motorola locked the bootloader by request of AT&T, meaning that custom versions of Android (ROMs) were not able to be installed. Only pseudo-roms (Not fully modified versions of Android) were available, since the kernel could not be overwritten.

Many customers wrote to Motorola, including on their Facebook page, and eventually a method to unlock the bootloader was released. People began to create custom ROMs for the phone, and eventually it gained official CyanogenMod 7 support. However, CyanogenMod support was more difficult to gain than for other phones because the Atrix shipped with uncommon features, such as WebTop support and a fingerprint reader.

After CyanogenMod 7 was finished, Motorola's support pages stated that the latest version (at the time) of Android, 4.0 Ice Cream Sandwich (ICS), would be released to the phone. This would be important for the development of CyanogenMod 9, since the existing kernel of the Atrix (based on Linux 2.6) was incompatible with Ice Cream Sandwich drivers. Though ROMs based on Ice Cream Sandwich could still be used, important features such as hardware acceleration did not work.

Motorola Mobility was then acquired by Google, and the online support page still claimed that the Atrix would receive ICS. However, eventually the page was updated stating that the Atrix would not receive the ICS update, meaning that development would be extremely difficult to move forward.

Eventually, developers were able to get a testing version of the incomplete AT&T ICS ROM, leading some to believe that ICS progress would move forward again. However, that build drained battery power rapidly and did not come with the kernel source, meaning that it could not be used for stable development purposes.

Some developers eventually developed a Jelly Bean ROM from the leak with minimal bugs.

Developers then decided to build their kernel based on the Nvidia Linux 3.1 kernel. According to kernel developer Krystian, "Motorola helped the team, and give them a little boost. We cannot say they played fair, but at least they help a little.". As for the kernel, it is being made "with ported code derived from a combination of sources."

In August 2014, a release of CyanogenMod 11 (based on Android 4.4 "KitKat") was made available.

== Successor ==
The Motorola Atrix 2 was released in late 2011 for AT&T. This was followed by the Motorola Atrix HD in 2012. A variant called Motorola Atrix TV was released in some markets including Brazil, featuring an antenna for digital television.

== See also ==
- Motorola Xoom
- Motorola Droid Bionic
- Motorola Cliq 2
- Galaxy Nexus

Other phones with Tegra 2 SoC:

- LG Optimus 2X
- Samsung Galaxy R
- Motorola Photon
- Droid X2
