= International Planetary Data Alliance =

Data management organization

- Abbreviation: IPDA
- Formation: 2006
- Type: INGO
- Region served: Worldwide
- Official language: English
- Website: IPDA Official website

The International Planetary Data Alliance (IPDA), founded in 2006, is a closely cooperating partnership to maintain the quality and performance of data (including data formats) from planetary research using instruments in space. Specific tasks include promoting the international exchange of high-quality scientific data, organized by a set of standards to facilitate data management. NASA's Planetary Data System is the de facto standard for archiving planetary data. Member organizations participate in both its Board and on specific projects related to building standards and interoperable systems.

In 2008, a Committee on Space Research (COSPAR) resolution made the IPDA an official body to set standards around the world regarding the archiving of planetary data.

== See also ==
- Agenzia Spaziale Italiana
- Centre National d'Études Spatiales
- European Space Agency
- German Aerospace Center
- Indian Space Research Organisation
- Japan Aerospace Exploration Agency
- National Aeronautics and Space Administration
- UK Space Agency
