= SPICE (observation geometry system) =

SPICE (Spacecraft Planet Instrument C-matrix Events) is a NASA ancillary information system used to compute geometric information used in planning and analyzing science observations obtained from robotic spacecraft. It is also used in planning missions and conducting numerous engineering functions needed to carry out those missions.

SPICE was developed at NASA's Navigation and Ancillary Information Facility (NAIF), located at the Jet Propulsion Laboratory. It has become the de facto standard for handling much of the so-called observation geometry information on NASA's planetary missions, and it is now widely used in support of science data analysis on planetary missions of other space agencies as well. Some SPICE capabilities are also used on a variety of astrophysics, solar physics and earth science missions.

== Data ==
SPICE data files are usually referred to as "kernels". These files provide information such as spacecraft trajectory and orientation; target body ephemeris, size and shape; instrument field-of-view size, shape and orientation; specifications for reference frames; and tabulations of time system conversion coefficients.

SPICE data are archived in a national archive center such as the NASA Planetary Data System archives.

=== Kernels ===
There are five major kernels and five other kernels.

- SPK: Space vehicle or target body trajectory (ephemeris)
- PcK: Target body size, shape and orientation
- IK: Instrument field-of-view size, shape and orientation
- CK: Orientation of space vehicle or any articulating structure on it
- EK: Events information
  - ESP: Science Plan
  - ESQ: Sequence of events
  - ENB: Experimenter’s Notebook
- Others:
  - FK: Reference frame specifications
  - LSK: Leapseconds tabulation
  - SCLK: Spacecraft clock coefficients
  - DSK: Digital shape models
  - MK: Meta-kernel

== Software ==
The SPICE system includes software referred to as The SPICE Toolkit, used for reading the SPICE data files and computing geometric parameters based on data from those files. These tools are provided as subroutine libraries in four programming languages: C, FORTRAN, IDL, MATLAB and Java Native Interface. Third parties offer Python and Ruby interfaces to the C-language Toolkit. The Toolkits also include a number of utility and application programs. The SPICE Toolkits are available for most popular computing platforms, operating systems and compilers. Extensive documentation accompanies each Toolkit.

WebGeocalc is a browser interface to a SPICE-based geometry engine running on the NAIF server designed to support users who choose not to write their own SPICE program. WebGeocalc reduces the technical barriers to writing a SPICE program, but it still requires considerable knowledge about SPICE data and solar system geometry. In addition, it doesn't offer the full range of computations available when using Toolkit software in your own program.

The NAIF Group also offers a 3-D mission visualization program named SPICE-Enhanced Cosmographia. This program runs in the OSX, Windows and Linux environments. Visual representations of mission SPICE data are controlled using an assortment of menus and GUI controls. A scripting interface is also available.

== Tutorials and programming lessons ==
A set of tutorials is available to help users understand the SPICE data and software. Some "open book" programming lessons useful in learning how to program using Toolkit subroutines are also available.

== Availability ==
The SPICE data, Toolkit software, tutorials and programming lessons are all freely available from the NAIF website. There are no licensing or export restrictions. Prospective users are cautioned that it takes some effort to learn to use this software: it is primarily provided for professionals in the space exploration business. Prospective users should carefully read the "Rules" page available at the NAIF website.
