= Parameter Value Language =

In computer programming, Parameter Value Language (PVL) is a markup language similar to XML. It is commonly employed for entries in the Planetary Database System used by NASA to store mission data, among other uses.

There are at least two "dialects" – USGS Isis Cube Label and NASA PDS 3 Label.
