= Motorola Atrix =

Motorola Atrix is a brand name for Motorola phones. These phones include:

- Motorola Atrix 4G
- Motorola Atrix 2
- Motorola Atrix HD
