= Droid Bionic =

Android smartphone developed by Motorola Mobility

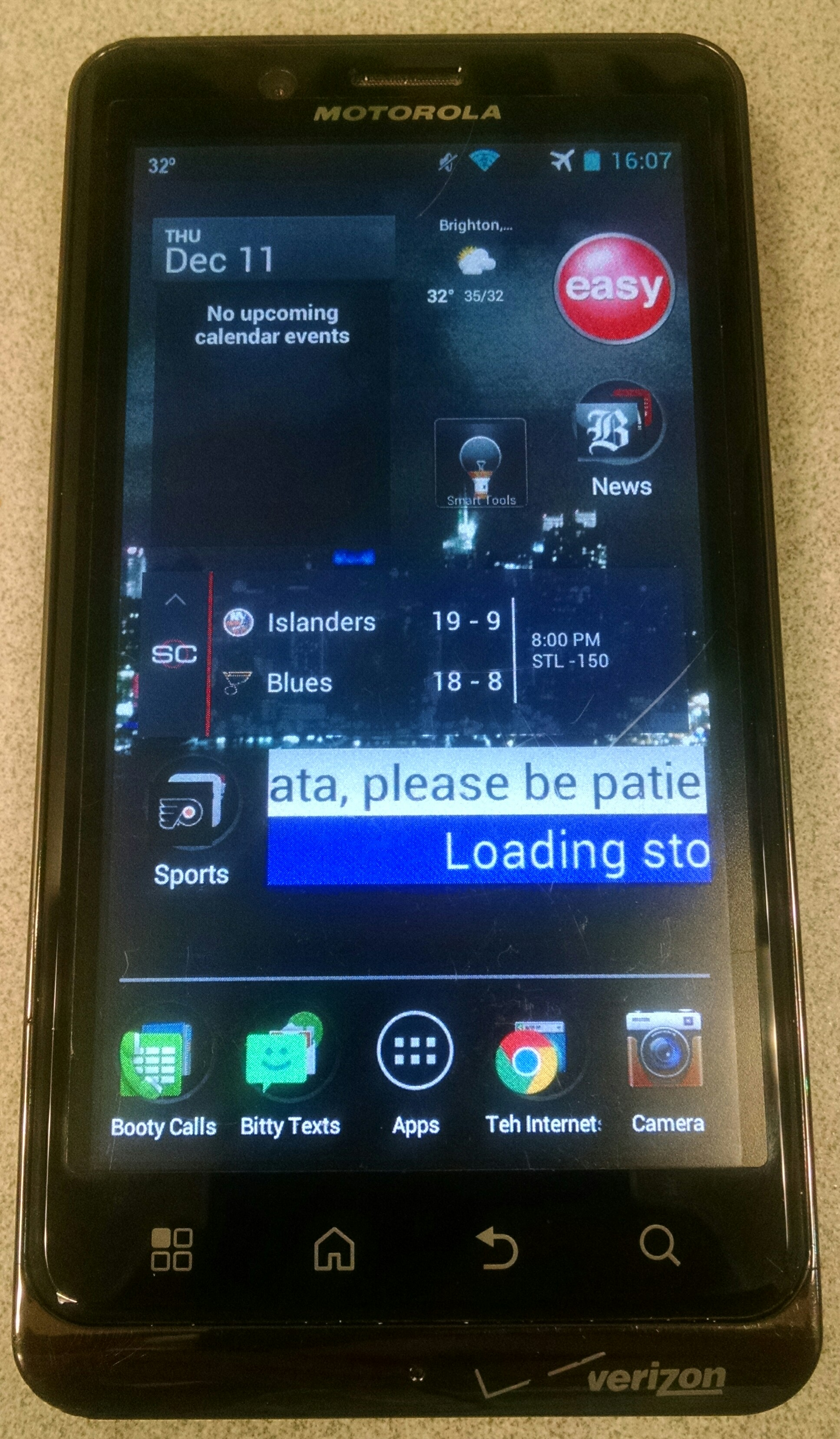
- Manufacturer: Motorola
- Series: Droid
- Availability by region: 8 September 2011
- Predecessor: Motorola DROID X2
- Successor: Motorola DROID RAZR
- Compatible networks: CDMA 800/1900 MHz EVDO Rev. A, 700 MHz 4G LTE, 802.11b/g/n,
- Dimensions: 127.5 mm (5.02 in) H 66.9 mm (2.63 in) W 10.9 mm (0.43 in) D
- Weight: 158 g (5.6 oz)
- Operating system: Official: Android 2.3.4 Gingerbread, upgradable to Android 4.1.2 Jelly Bean (with Motorola Application Platform); Unofficial: Android 7.1 Nougat via LineageOS 14.1
- CPU: 1 GHz dual-core ARM Cortex-A9 SoC processor; TI OMAP4430 (1.2 GHz after ICS update)
- GPU: PowerVR SGX540 @ 304 MHz
- Memory: 16 GB flash memory, 1 GB LP DDR2 RAM
- Removable storage: 16 GB pre-installed microSD card. Supports up to 32 GB microSD
- Battery: 1735 mAh
- Rear camera: 8-megapixel with 1080p HD video recording
- Front camera: VGA
- Display: 4.3-inch 960 × 540 px qHD at 256 ppi
- Connectivity: Bluetooth v2.1 + EDR, HDMI, 3.5 mm TRRS audio jack, Micro USB, DLNA
- Data inputs: Multi-touch capacitive touchscreen display
- Hearing aid compatibility: M4/T3

The Motorola Droid Bionic is an Android-based, 4G LTE-capable smartphone designed by Motorola. It was originally scheduled for release in Q2 2011 but was delayed, eventually being released on 8 September 2011.

It was introduced at the 2011 Consumer Electronics Show along with the Motorola Atrix 4G, Motorola Xoom, and Motorola CLIQ 2.

== Reception ==
According to several sites there have been early complaints of a high-pitched whine during audio playback through the headphones. With the first officially available update, released to testers on 9 December 2011, this issue was solved.

== Software updates ==
Verizon Wireless announced the first firmware upgrade for the Droid Bionic, version 5.5.893, on 8 December 2011. The update was pushed to a limited test group on 9 December 2011, with plans to release it as an over-the-air (OTA) update package at a later date. The patch fixes many of the issues users reported at the Bionic's launch, with improvements including a smoother hand-off between 4G (LTE) and 3G (eHRPD/CDMA) data networks and software attenuation to eliminate the high-pitched transistor bleed ("hum") previously noticed in sound from the 3.5 mm jack.

On 19 December, some owners began receiving an OTA update to version 5.9.901. It was later provided as a download for manual installation. Later on, the changelog, or list of improvements was released.

A Motorola employee later confirmed the update was released to some users by accident, and will later be released to all other DROID Bionic users soon.

In April 2012, an OTA update to version 5.9.902 was released, followed by one in June to version 5.9.905.

In June 2012 Ice Cream Sandwich builds 6.7.2231, 6.7.2233, 6.7.232 & 6.7.235, were pulled from Motorola's servers through cheesecake. It provided users with Android 4.0.4, with many features such as overclocking the CPU from 1.0 GHz to 1.2 GHz and including Webtop 3.0. However, the leaks included many bugs, such as the webtop launcher causing systemUI to crash, white text in the widgets menu (In custom launchers), and facelock not enabling correctly. Leak 6.7.235 will not let users FXZ back to OTA 5.9.902.

In October 2012, Verizon officially released Ice Cream Sandwich Android 4.0.4 for the device.

In April 2013, Verizon officially released Jelly Bean Android 4.1.2 for the device.

== Features ==
The smartphone includes 4G LTE, Wi-Fi, HDMI output, 1 GHz OMAP dual core processor, a 4.3" qHD display, 3G/4G wireless hotspot capability, GPS, an 8 MP low-light–capable camera with 1080p HD video capture and a front-facing camera capable of Video Chat. In the United States, the handset is distributed exclusively by Verizon Wireless.

== Specifications ==
Motorola Droid Bionic (also known as Motorola XT875) was the first dual core Android handset to use Verizon's 4G LTE network. It comes with a 4.3 inch qHD (960 x 540) display, a 1 GHz OMAP4 dual-core processor from Texas Instruments, and 1 GB of LP DDR2 RAM. It also has an 8-megapixel camera capable of 1080p HD video and a front-facing camera to support video calling. The phone comes with Adobe Flash and HTML5 support, as well as with HDMI output to an HDTV.

Motorola Droid Bionic specifications:

General info:

- Phone type: Smartphone

Network technology:

- CDMA: 850, 1900
- LTE: 700
- CDMA Data: 1xRTT and EVDO Rev. A
- LTE: Yes

Design:

- Form Factor: Candybar
- Dimensions: 5.01 x 2.63 x 0.42 (127.5 x 66.9 x 10.9 mm)
- Weight: 5.57 oz (158 g)

Display:

- Resolution: 960 x 540 pixels
- Physical Size: 4.30 inches
- Colors: 16,777,216
- Touch Screen: Yes (Capacitive)
- Multi-touch: Yes
- Proximity Sensor: Yes
- Light sensor: Yes
- Battery Capacity: 1735 mAh

Software:

- Smart Phone: Yes
- OS: Android 2.3.4 Gingerbread, upgradable to Android 4.1.2 Jelly Bean

Hardware:

- Processor: OMAP4 Dual-Core
- Processor speed: 1000 MHz (Overclocked to 1200 MHz from ICS update)
- Memory: 1 GB RAM / 16 GB flash storage
- 3D Graphics hardware accelerator: PowerVR SGX540

Camera:

- Resolution: 8 megapixels
- Flash: Yes (Dual LED)
- Features: Auto focus, Digital zoom
- Video capture: Yes
- Resolution: 1920x1080 (1080p HD) (30 frames per second)
- Additional camera: Yes (VGA)
- Video Calling: Yes

Multimedia:

- Music Player: Yes
- Supports: MP3, AAC, AAC+, eAAC+, MIDI
- Video Playback: Yes
- Supports: MPEG4, H.263, H.264
- YouTube player: Yes

Internet browsing:

- Supports: HTML, Flash
- Built-in online services support: Facebook, Picasa, Twitter, Google Play

Services:

- Type: S-GPS
- Navigation: Yes
- Phonebook Support: Yes
- Capacity: Capacity depends on system memory
- Features: Caller groups, Multiple numbers per contact, Search by both first and last name, Picture ID, Ring ID
- Organizer Calendar: Yes
- Alarms: Yes
- Document Viewer: Yes
- Other: Calculator
- Messaging
- SMS: Yes
- E-mail: Yes (IMAP, POP3, SMTP, Microsoft Exchange)

Memory

- Memory Expansion: Yes
- Slot Type: microSD, microSDHC
- Maximum card size: 64 GB
- Built-in: 16 GB

Connectivity

- Bluetooth: Yes
- Version: 2.1
- EDR: Yes
- Wi-Fi: Yes, 2.4 GHz only (802.11b, 802.11g, 802.11n)
- USB: Yes
- Type: microUSB
- Version: USB 2.0
- Features: Mass storage device, USB charging
- Headphones connector: 3.5 mm
- HDMI: Yes
- Version: 1.4
- DLNA: Yes

Notifications

- Service lights: Yes
- Colors per light: Multiple

Other features

- Sensors: Accelerometer, Compass, Proximity

Availability

- Officially announced: 5 Jan 2011
- Officially released: 8 September 2011

== Webtop ==
Similar to the Motorola Atrix 4G, it has the integrated Debian-based 'Webtop' application from Motorola. The Webtop application is launched when the phone is connected to the external display through Laptop dock or HD multimedia dock. In Webtop mode, offering similar user interface of typical Ubuntu desktop, the phone can run several applications on external display such as Firefox web browser, SNS clients and 'mobile view' application enabling total access to the Bionic and its screen. In September 2011, Motorola released the source code of Webtop application at SourceForge.

== See also ==
- List of Android devices
- Motorola Xoom
- Motorola Atrix 4G
- Motorola Cliq
- Galaxy Nexus
