= Motorola Spice =

Smartphone developed by Motorola

Motorola Spice is a smartphone developed by Motorola. It was announced in October 2010 at the International CTIA Wireless in San Francisco and shortly after, released to the public in December 2010. The phone is powered by a 528 MHz Qualcomm processor running Android 2.1 Eclair. The Spice features a 3-inch TFT capacitive touchscreen, 3.2-megapixel camera, and unlike many smartphones running Android, it has a slide-out full QWERTY keyboard and Motorola's Backtrack rear touch trackpad system.
