= Motorola Cliq =

Android smartphone developed by Motorola Mobility

Motorola Cliq (MB200) or Dext
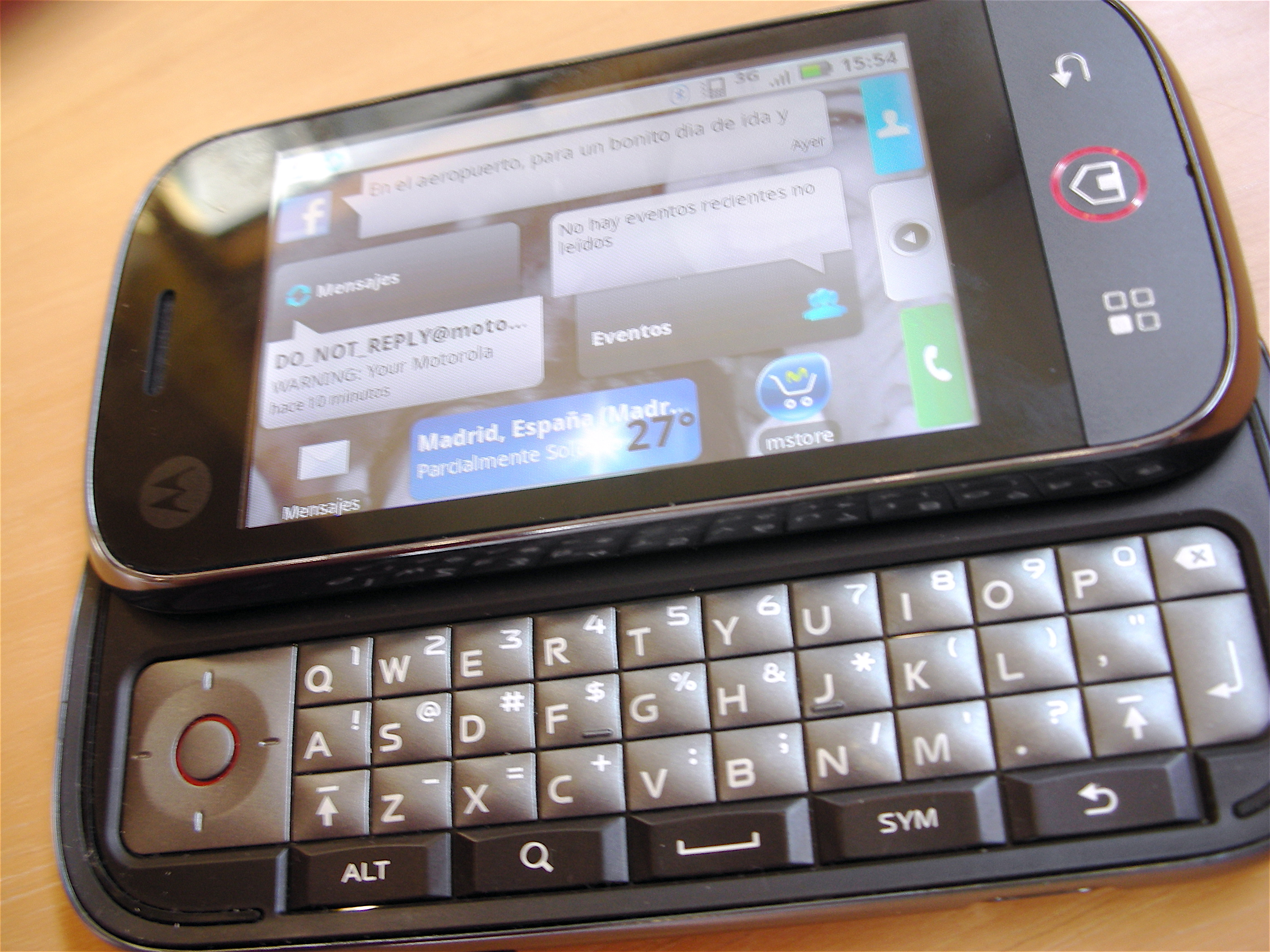
- Manufacturer: Motorola
- Type: Slider smartphone
- First released: Europe, October 2009; 16 years ago
- Compatible networks: GSM 850/900/1800/1900, EDGE; UMTS 900/1700/2100
- Dimensions: 114 mm (4.5 in) H 58 mm (2.3 in) W 15.6 mm (0.61 in) D
- Weight: 163 g (5.7 oz)
- Operating system: Android v1.5 Cupcake, 2.1 Eclair upgrade, US only, 2.2 and 2.3 and 4.0 via Cyanogen 6,7,9
- CPU: 528 MHz Qualcomm MSM7201A processor
- Memory: RAM: 256MB, ROM: 512MB
- Storage: Flash memory: 256 MB, 199 free microSD slot: supports up to 32 GB
- Removable storage: microSD (TransFlash), up to 32GB, 2GB included
- Battery: Standard battery, Li-ion 1420 mAh, stand-by: up to 320 h, talk time: up to 6 h
- Rear camera: 5 megapixel with auto focus, geotagging
- Display: 320 x 480 px, (0.15 megapixels) 3.2 in (81 mm), TFT LCD, HVGA
- Connectivity: Wi-Fi (802.11b/g), Bluetooth 2.0+EDR, Micro USB 2.0, A-GPS
- Data inputs: Capacitive touchscreen, virtual keyboard, sliding QWERTY keyboard, sliding D-pad

The Motorola Cliq, marketed as Motorola Dext outside the U.S., is an Android-based smartphone developed and marketed by Motorola. It was released in 2009 and was the first ever Motorola device to run Android. It has a custom user interface named MOTOBLUR.

== Features ==
The Cliq/Dext has 3G/HSDPA (900, 1700, 2100); in the US, it is only compatible with T-Mobile's 3G UMTS network.

It also has Wi-Fi ability, a 5-megapixel camera and video recording (at 24 frames per second), a standard 3.5 mm headphone jack, an HTML browser, and a QWERTY keyboard. It also has access to applications through the Android Market that is part of the Android operating system. Some of the other key features of the device are Motoblur, remote wipe and link calls with mapping software.

Motoblur's primary function is to enable users to receive various updates from a variety of sources such as Twitter, Facebook, LastFM, and Email clients directly on their phone's main screen.

Motodext (European edition) was launched by early October 2009 in the UK by Orange UK followed by the US launch of the US edition Cliq by T-Mobile US on 2 November 2009.

On 23 January 2010, Motorola launched Cliq/Dext in Singapore, its first Asian market, exclusively through Singapore Telecom/Singtel. It launched on 9 April 2010 in Australia exclusively on the Optus mobile network.

== Updates: Android 1.5 ==
Notice, all updates include earlier update improvements as well, so newer updates seem to carry more improvements at first glance.

=== 1.1.31 ===
Early December 2009 T-Mobile US started pushing an operating system update OTA. Update features include: better battery life management, improved Bluetooth connection, touch screen accuracy improvement, accelerometer accuracy, and hang-up issues. The patch (to system version 1.1.31) is about 8 MB.

=== 1.3.18 ===
On 22 February 2010, Motorola released on over-the-air software upgrade to the Motoblur interface, its version number is 1.3.18. The update includes:

- Enhanced battery life.
- Improved touchscreen detection and accuracy.
- Better audio routing preventing random occurrences of speakerphone during calls. Music is appropriately routed to the external speakers instead of the earphones.
- General improvements to the Blur user interface and better notification of incoming calls as well as an improvement on missed call notifications.
- Faster and more accurate GPS lock-ons for applications such as Google Maps, geotagging for photographs, and various other GPS functions.
- Additional Windows Media formats compatibility such as .WMA and .WAV media formats.
- Improvements to Bluetooth functionality such as compatibility with Bluetooth car kits and the ability to export contacts to the car kit to for calling, displaying contact names, and viewing call history.
- A SIM card management application that allows for the importing, exporting, and deletion of contacts in groups or individually.
- Improved stability in applications that quit unexpectedly and occurrences of unresponsiveness.
- Provides access to the latest Google applications such as the Android market, YouTube, and Google Talk.
- An update to the latest version of the preloaded Quickoffice which allows editing of Microsoft Office documents.

=== 1.4.8 ===
Early April 2010, T-Mobile and Motorola released a new 2-part update, which includes:

- 1.4.2 - Updated Radio (Stage 1). Phone then reboots & downloads OTA The 1.4.8 Update.
- 1.4.8 - Stage 2
- The "End Call" key was relocated within the calling screen to reduce instances of unintentionally ending Active calls
- General improvements to text messaging - especially for longer message threads
- Enhanced battery performance
- Improves the touch screen sensitivity and response of the device-including touch sensitivity for keys on or around the display borders
- Enhances audio quality in certain scenarios in which users experienced issues
- Set-up wizard improved to make Motoblur set-up for new users or those who have been prompted to re-enter information easier
- Repairs audio routing to prevent: spontaneous speakerphone activations during calls and the random occurrence of music playback through the earpiece instead of appropriate external speakers
- Improves user interface performance-consistently notifying users when a new call is coming in which reduces missed call notifications
- Provides faster GPS performance for applications such as Google Maps, Geotagging of photos and other GPS functions
- Compatible with more media formats including .WMA and .WAV Windows media files
- Enables users to listen to visual voicemail via Bluetooth and enables the Bluetooth car kit to sync to user's device, thus the car kit can display the names of incoming callers and download phone book contacts (calls can now be made from the car kit display and enables users to view the call history list from the car kit display)
- Enables user to import, export or delete contacts individually or in groups
- Additional device stability reduces occurrence of unresponsiveness and/or programs quitting unexpectedly
- Updated Google Mobile Services application provides access to the latest Android 1.5 compatible versions of Google applications such as Maps, Talk, YouTube, Market, and more
- Adds the ability to view documents in Microsoft Office 2007 format
- Some users of this version report a spacebar (and possibly other keys) bug when the light sensor detects dim lighting, such as in doors or at night. (link to forum postings coming soon)

== Updates: Android 2 ==
Upgrade to Android 2.1 was officially released to the U.S. public on 9 November 2010. The European and Latin American versions of the phone (the Dext) will not receive the update.

=== Upgrade delays and leak ===
At various times, Motorola promised to update the Cliq to Android OS 2.1. The update was slated to release during Q2 of 2010, but again postponed. Before the official public release, around August 2010, a version of the 2.1 update was leaked, enabling users to receive the update without having to root the device.

=== CyanogenMod and Android 2.3 ===
The popular aftermarket Android operating system CyanogenMod supports the Motorola Cliq as of version 7.2, a release based on Android 2.3.7.

== Cliq XT ==
The Motorola Cliq XT (also known as the Motorola Quench) [Model numbers: MB501] was released on 17 March 2010. Its functionally is very similar to the Cliq, except the XT does not have a physical keyboard.

The Motorola Cliq XT has been surrounded by update controversy since its early days. Soon after its launch Motorola had a scheduled the Cliq XT to receive the Android 2.1 update in Q2 2010. After months of silent delays, being pushed back to Q3 2010, then Q4 2010, and a period of "additional testing in process." On 3 February 2011 Motorola made the announcement that the Cliq XT will not be receiving the 2.1 update and that it would stay on its current Android 1.5 build.

== Cliq 2 ==
Motorola Cliq 2 (MB611)
- Manufacturer: Motorola
- Type: Slider smartphone
- First released: North America, January 2011; 15 years ago
- Compatible networks: GSM 850/900/1800/1900, EDGE; HSDPA 850/1700/2100
- Dimensions: 116 mm (4.6 in) H 59.6 mm (2.35 in) W 14.5 mm (0.57 in) D
- Weight: 175 g (6.2 oz)
- Operating system: Android v2.2 Froyo
- CPU: 1 GHz Texas Instruments OMAP 3620 processor
- Memory: RAM: 512MB, ROM: 1024MB
- Storage: Flash memory: 512 MB microSD slot: supports up to 32 GB
- Removable storage: microSD (TransFlash), up to 32GB
- Battery: Standard battery, Li-ion 1780 mAh, Stand-by: Up to 312h Talk time: Up to 7h 50min
- Rear camera: 5 megapixel with auto focus, geotagging, dual LED flash
- Display: 480x 854 px, 3.7 in (94 mm), TFT LCD, HVGA
- Connectivity: Wi-Fi (802.11b/g), Bluetooth 2.0+EDR, Micro USB 2.0, A-GPS
- Data inputs: Capacitive touchscreen, virtual keyboard, sliding QWERTY keyboard, sliding D-pad

At CES 2011, Motorola revealed the Motorola Cliq 2 which was released on 19 January 2011. The phone retains a similar design to the original Cliq, including the physical keyboard and the Motoblur UI. Also featuring Android 2.2, a 3.7" (854 x 480)FWVGA display and a 5MP camera with dual LED flash. It also housed a unique "honeycomb" style keyboard as well as upgrading to a TI OMAP3 3620 1GHz processor. Originally, the Cliq 2 was only available in the United States; on a 2-year contract from T-Mobile.

== See also ==
- List of Android smartphones
- Android (operating system)
- Motoblur
- Motorola Android devices
  - Motorola Backflip
  - Cliq XT
  - Motorola Devour
  - Motorola Droid
  - Motorola Droid X
- Galaxy Nexus
