= Motorola Backflip =

Android smartphone developed by Motorola Mobility

Motorola BackFlip
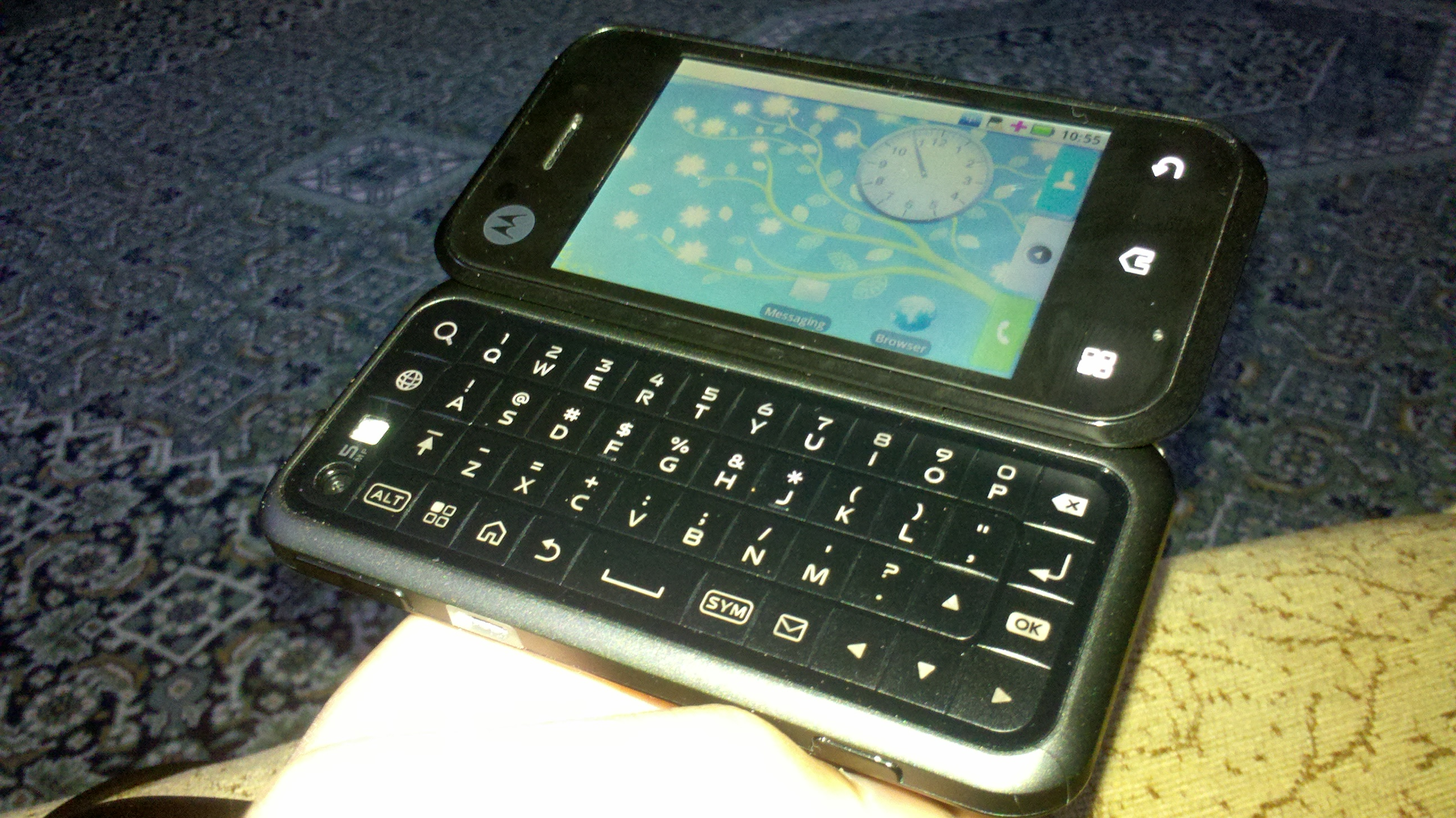
- Manufacturer: Motorola Mobility
- Type: Flip smartphone
- Compatible networks: UMTS 900/1900/2100
- Dimensions: 53.00×108.00×15.30 mm (2.087×4.252×0.602 in)
- Weight: 133 g (4.7 oz)
- Operating system: Android v1.5 (Cupcake), 2.1 (Eclair), can go up to 2.2.1 (Froyo), and 2.3.7 (Gingerbread) via CyanogenMod
- CPU: 528 MHz Qualcomm MSM7201A processor (overclockable to 768 MHz via root and overclock kernel)
- Memory: RAM: 256MB, ROM: 512MB
- Storage: Flash memory: 256 MB, 199 free; microSD slot: supports up to 32 GB
- Battery: Standard battery, Li-ion 1420 mAh, stand-by: up to 320 h, talk time: up to 6 h
- Rear camera: 5.0 megapixel with auto focus, geotagging
- Display: 320 × 480 px, 3.1 in (79 mm), TFT LCD, HVGA
- Connectivity: Wi-Fi (802.11b/g), Bluetooth 2.0+EDR, Micro USB, A-GPS
- Data inputs: Capacitive touchscreen, virtual keyboard, flip QWERTY keyboard
- Model: MB300
- Codename: Motus

The Motorola Backflip (also called the Motorola Motus in some regions) is a touchscreen smartphone released to the U.S. for AT&T on March 7, 2010, and for other countries on Telus and Optus. It runs the open source Google Android software.

== General features ==
- The phone is built on the Android 1.5. Motorola features Motoblur, which integrates multiple social network service sites on the homescreen. This cannot be uninstalled or disabled unless the phone is modified.
- It has a full QWERTY keypad with a "reverse flip" design. When the device is closed and the screen is visible to the user, the reverse side is the keypad itself. Opening the device causes the screen to flip so that it rests above the keypad.

== Specifications ==
The specifications according to the Motorola website in June 2010:

=== Hardware ===
- Model MB300
- Screen size: 3.1-in.
- Screen resolution: HVGA (320 × 480 pixels)
- Weight: 4.7 oz
- Size: 53.0 × 108.0 × 15.3 mm
- Input devices: QWERTY keyboard, touchscreen, Backtrack navigation pad behind screen
- Battery: 1400 mAh Li Ion 3.7v Motorola BN80
- Talk time: 350 min, 6 hrs
- Standby time: up to 315 hrs, 13.5 days
- Processor: 528 mHz (overclockable to 768 MHz via root and overclock kernel)
- RAM: 256MB
- ROM: 512MB
- Memory: up to 32 GB MicroSD
- Wi-Fi: 802.11b/g
- Bluetooth: 2.0 + EDR and A2DP
- GPS receiver, accelerometer
- Dual microphone with noise cancellation
- Five megapixels with 4x digital zoom
- LED flash and automatic focus
- Video capture rate of 24 fps

== Applications ==
Users may customize their phones by installing apps through the Android Market; however, some carriers (AT&T) do not give users the option to install non-market apps onto the Backflip (a policy they have continued with all of their Android phones). This has created some controversy with users, as the non-market apps are often seen as a useful way to expand a phone's capabilities. Users can circumvent this limitation by manually installing 3rd party apps using the tools included with the SDK while the handset is connected to a computer.

== Reviews ==
Michael Oryl, of "Mobileburn.com," likes the "Backtrack" touchpad on the back of the phone, but points out that large hands often activate it accidentally. Victor Godinez, of The Dallas Morning News, suggests that the phone is aimed towards social networkers, and points out that the price is higher than other options with additional features such as the iPhone.

== System upgrades ==
On November 9, 2010, a downloadable update, Android OS 2.1 (Eclair) and a compatible version of MotoBlur was released by Motorola for AT&T Backflip customers, U.S. only. The update is unavailable over-the-air (OTA). Since then Eclair is available for phones outside U.S. that are rooted with custom recoveries installed and radio updated. CyanogenMod 7.2 (Android 2.3.7) is available through official releases. Other custom roms are also available.

=== Overclocking ===
Overclocking is possible via overclocking kernels and direct overclocking. Overclocking is available up to 768 MHz on the official CyanogenMod 7 rom.

=== Multitouch ===
Since this phone lacks the multitouch feature, a patch was made available for the Froyo ROM. Testers reported problems with the touchscreen which becomes jerky and eventually ceases to operate.

== Gallery ==
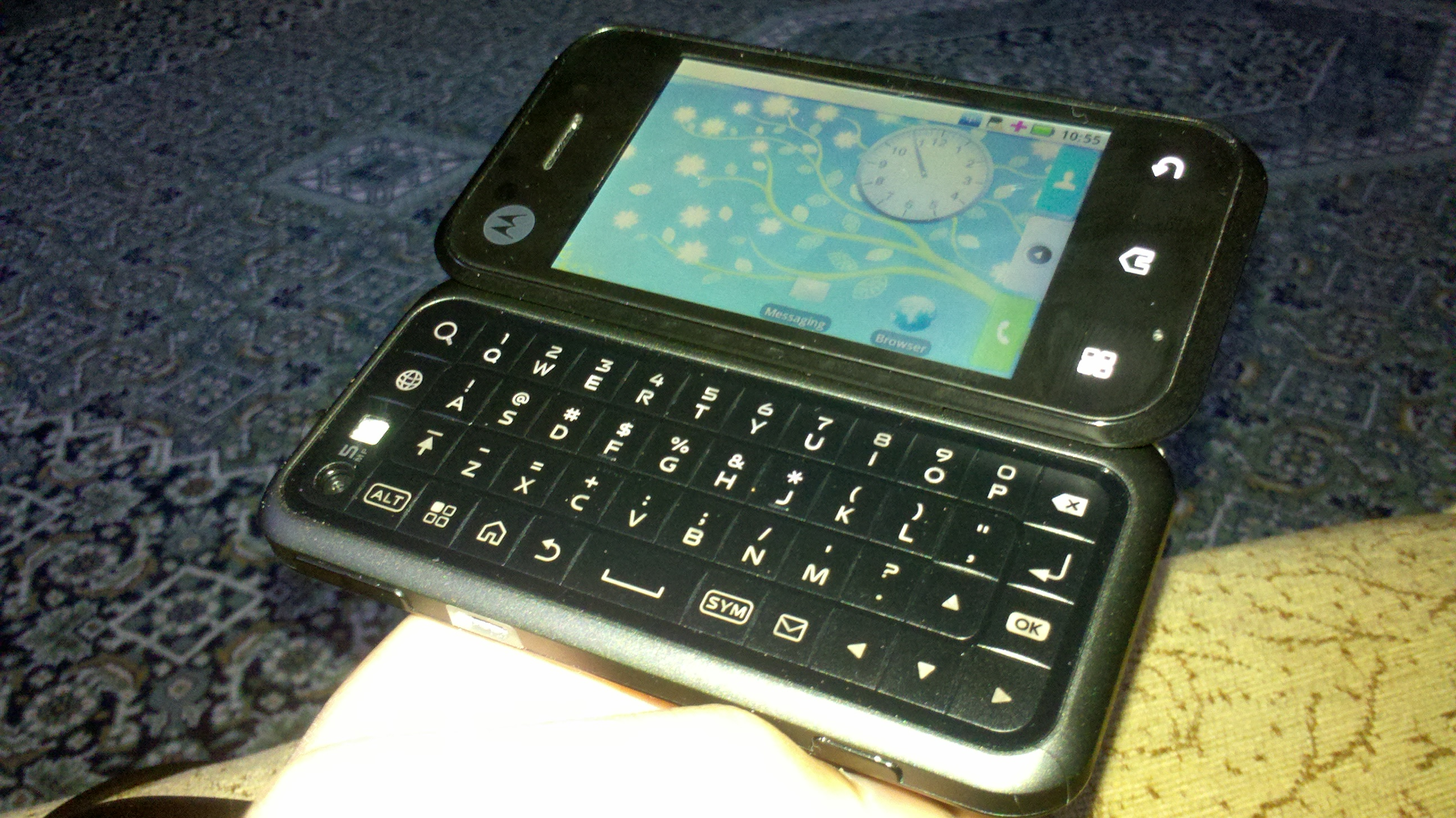
Front side and keyboard

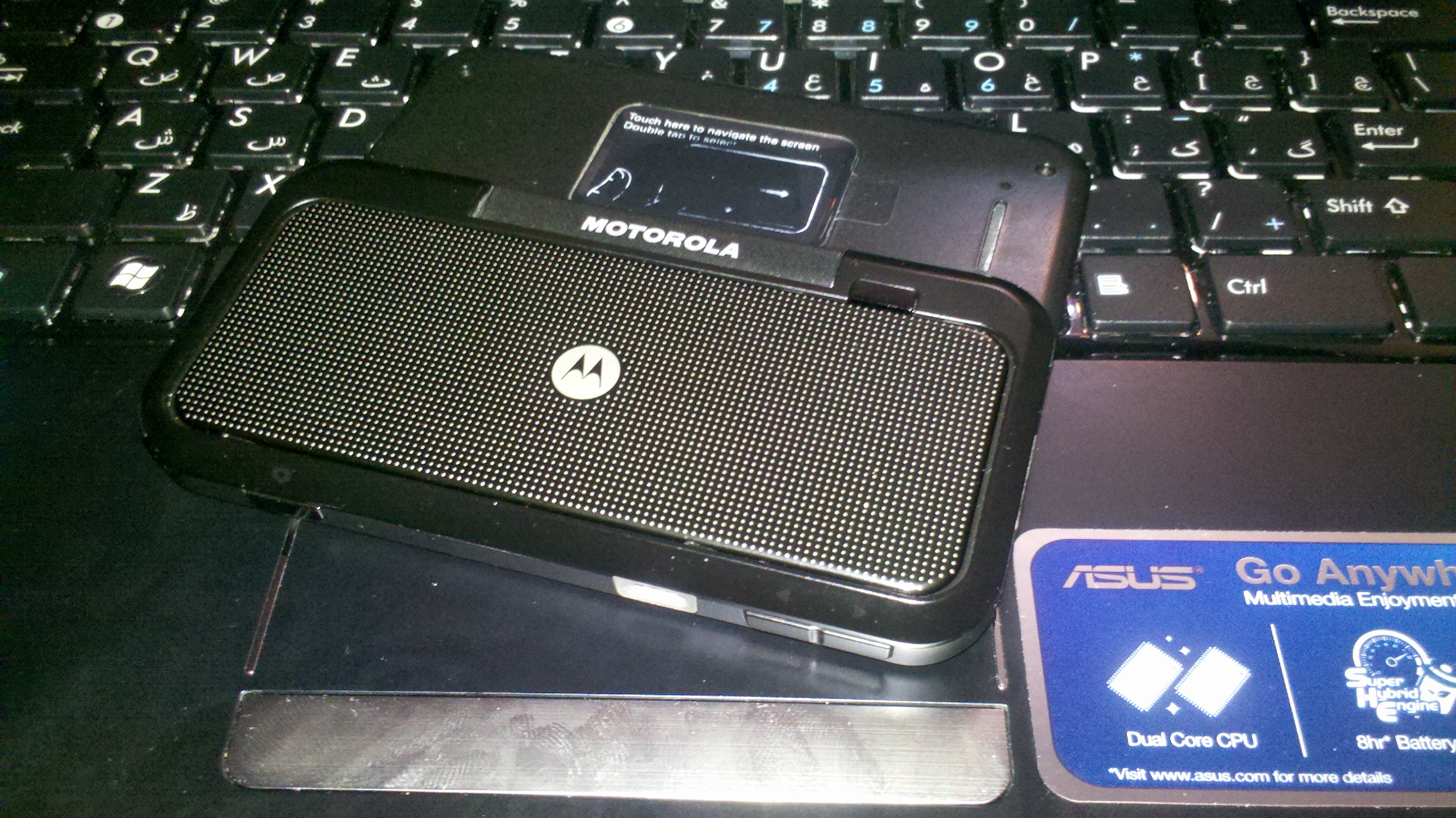
Rear side and touchpad

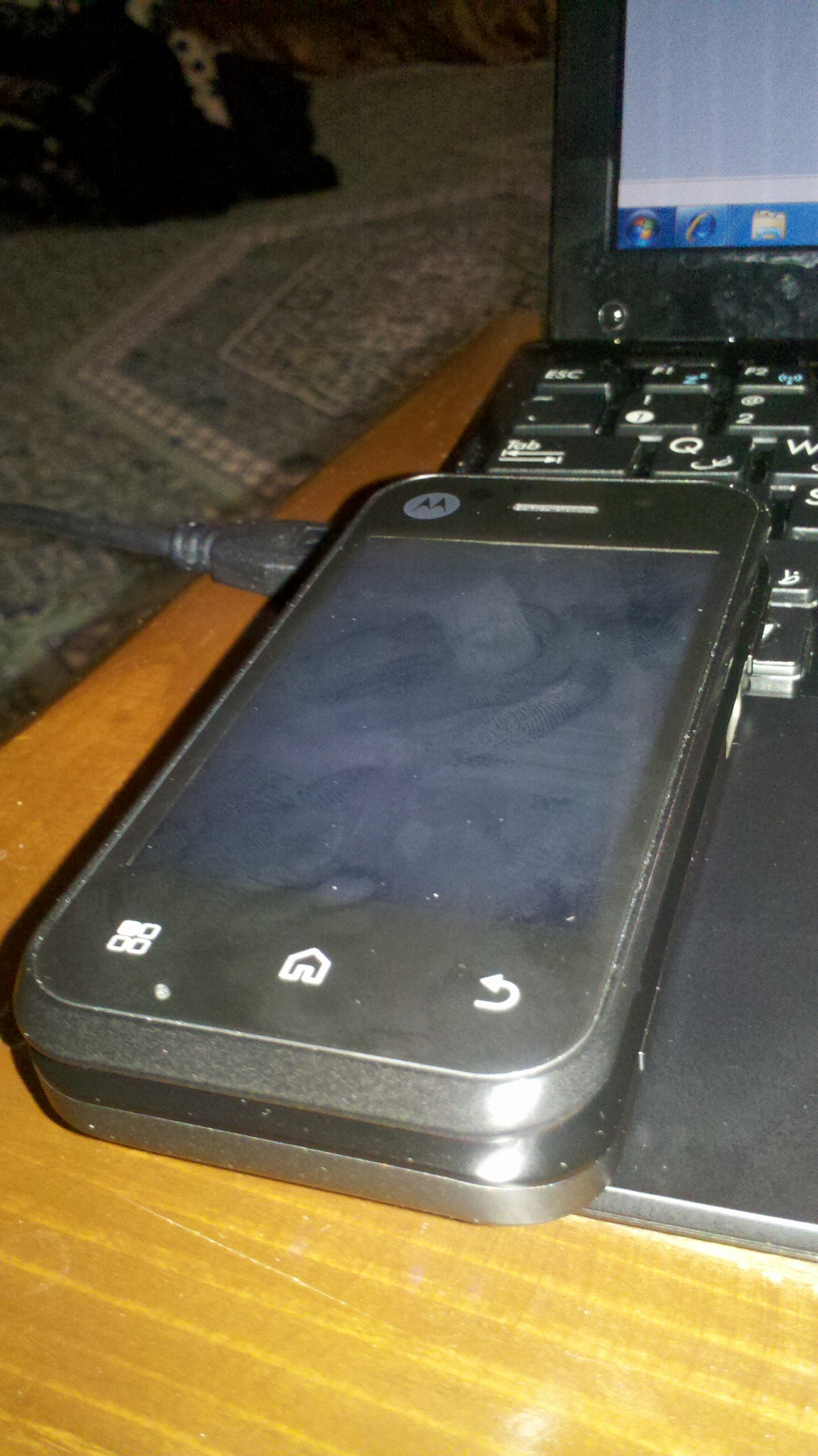
Front side

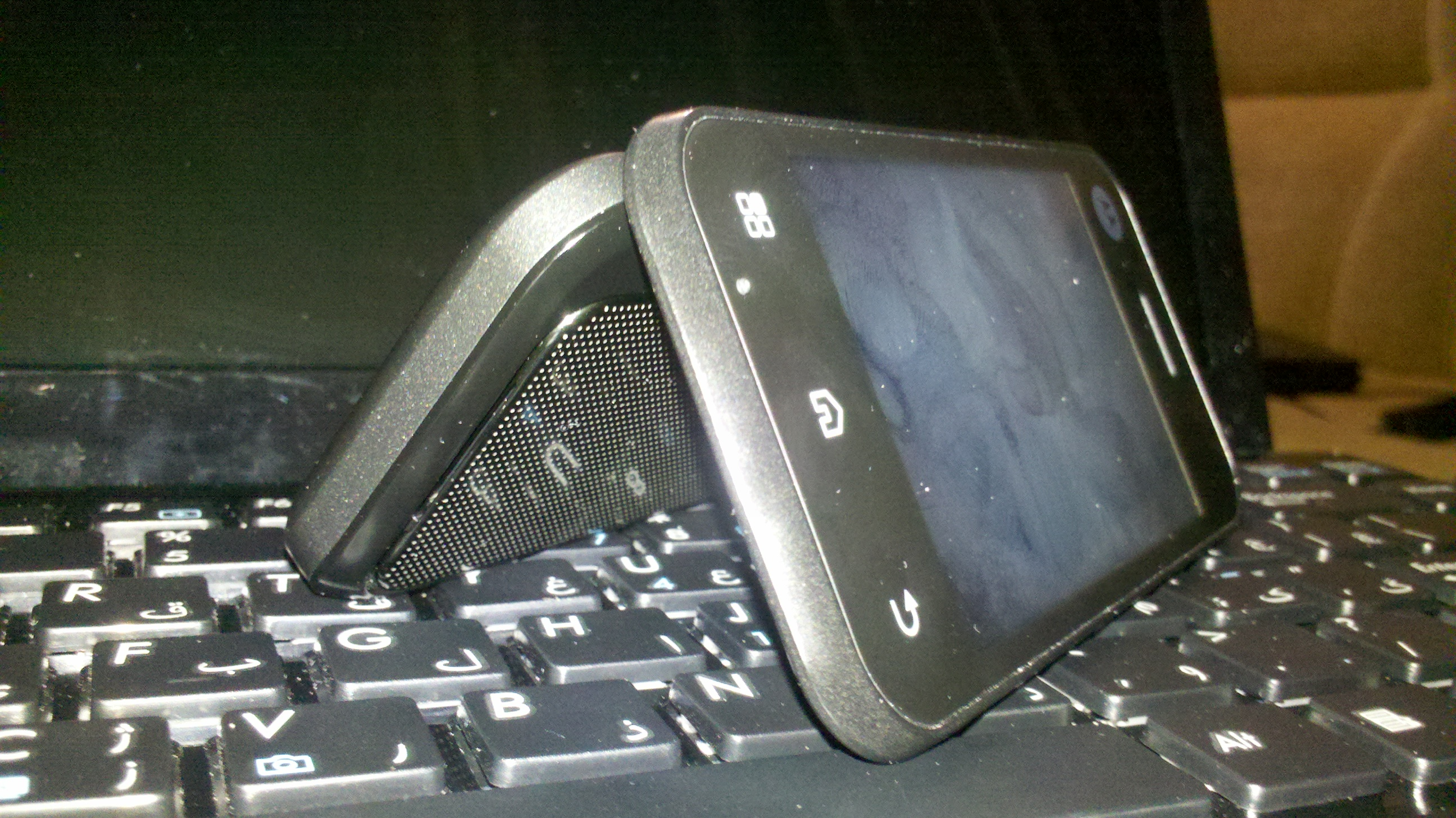
Flip side

== See also ==
- Galaxy Nexus
- List of Android smartphones
