= STRaND-1 =

Nanosatellite

- Mission type: Technology
- Operator: Surrey Space Centre
- COSPAR ID: 2013-009E
- SATCAT no.: 39090

Spacecraft properties
- Spacecraft type: 3U CubeSat
- Manufacturer: SSTL

Start of mission
- Launch date: 25 February 2013, 12:31 UTC
- Rocket: PSLV-CA C20
- Launch site: Satish Dhawan FLP
- Contractor: ISRO

Orbital parameters
- Reference system: Geocentric
- Regime: Low Earth

STRaND-1 (Surrey Training, Research and Nanosatellite Demonstrator 1) is a failed 3U CubeSat developed by Surrey University's Surrey Space Centre (SSC) and Surrey Satellite Technology (SSTL). The 4.3 kg (9.5 lb) nanosatellite was launched into orbit on board a PSLV Rocket from India on February 25, 2013, Smartphones have flown in space before inside the International Space Station, and the computer from a PDA launched inside two Japanese CubeSats in 2006 and 2008.

STRaND-1 initially operated with a conventional CubeSat computer before it was supposed to be switched over to an on-board Android-based Nexus One smartphone, but the conventional computer stopped communicating before the switch-over could start. As a result, NASA's PhoneSats (Alexander, Graham and Bell) were the first smartphone satellites to work in space, despite having been launched two months later than STRaND-1.

The satellite was found broadcasting telemetry again in June 2013, after a two-month silence. There are no reports of any instrument being turned on.

== Design and operation ==
STRaND-1 is operated by two computers: one is the classic CubeSat computer and second is a Google Nexus One smartphone running the Android operating system.

There was a public contest in August 2011 to create "space apps" to run on various satellite smartphones, including NASA's PhoneSat series. The winning Android app entries for STRaND-1 included an app for magnetic field measurements, satellite telemetry display, an Earth imaging application called 360 App, as well as one app which is purported to allow users to see people scream in space, although the smartphone never properly turned on and the developed apps were never used.

The smartphone was intended to provide cameras, accelerometers and high-performance computer processors - almost everything except solar panels and propulsion. During the first phase of the mission, STRaND-1 was intended to use a number of experimental apps to collect data, while a new high-speed Linux-based CubeSat computer developed by SSC takes care of the satellite. During phase two the STRaND team intended to switch the satellite's in-orbit operations to the smartphone, thereby testing the capabilities of a number of standard smartphone components in a space environment. However, the smartphone on board STRaND-1 was never able to turn on, and was not used to control the failed satellite before the computer unexpectedly turned off in March 2013 (phase two was not turned on at this time, and the smartphone never turned on or functioned). On July 23, 2013 Mike Rupprecht DK3WN received signals from the UK STRaND-1 satellite after a near four-month absence.

== See also ==
- InflateSail, a 2017 satellite with a drag-deorbiting sail also developed by Surrey University
- NASA PhoneSats
- List of CubeSats
