= LG Optimus X =

2012 smartphone model

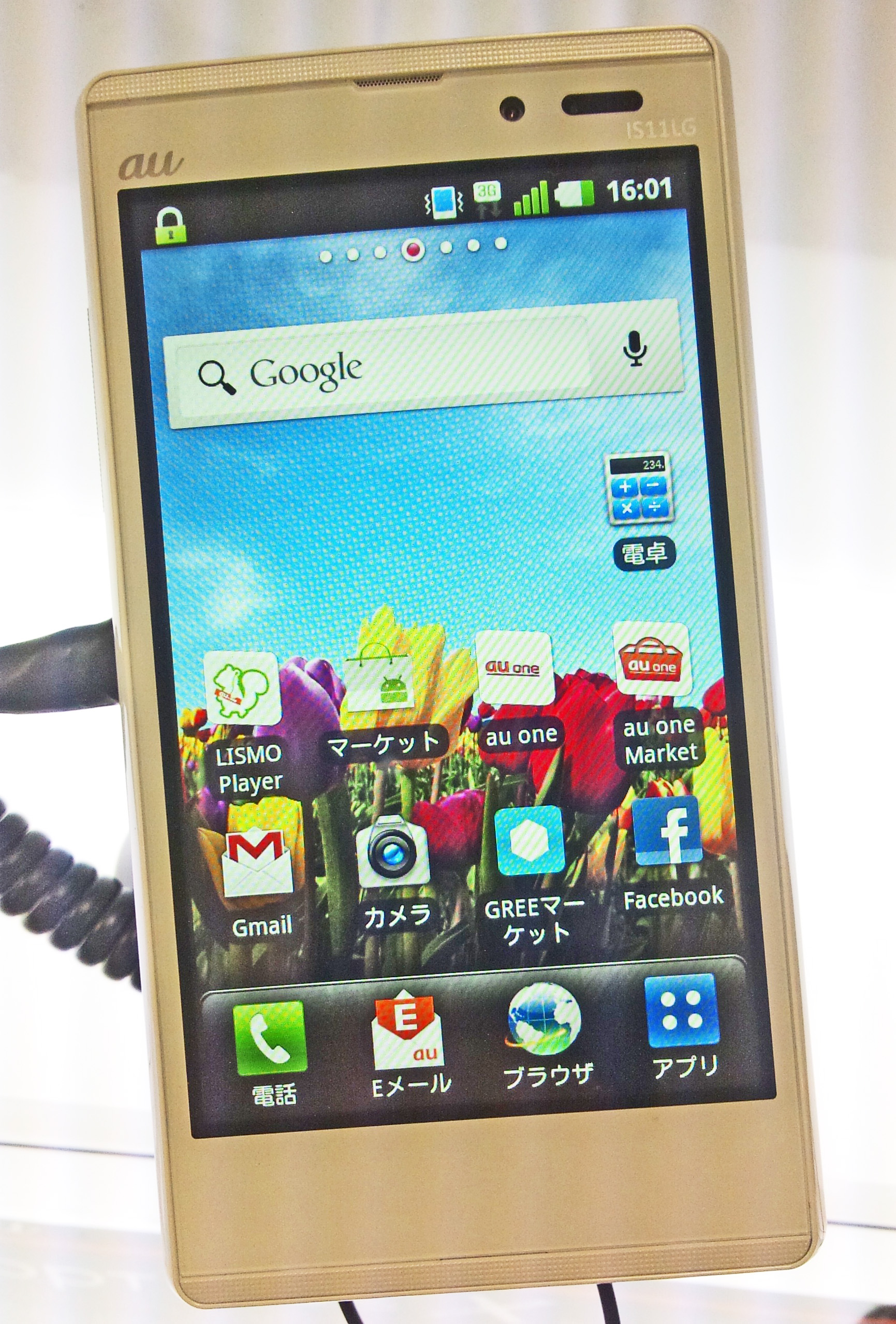
- Brand: au
- Manufacturer: LG Electronics
- Type: Smartphone
- Series: Optimus
- First released: January 20, 2012
- Discontinued: November 2012
- Compatible networks: CDMA 1X WIN (CDMA2000 1xMC)
- Form factor: Slate
- Colors: White; Black
- Dimensions: 118 mm (4.6 in) H 64 mm (2.5 in) W 9.9 mm (0.39 in) D
- Weight: 130 g (4.6 oz)
- Operating system: Android 2.3 (upgradable to Android 4.0)
- CPU: 1.2 GHz dual-core NVIDIA Tegra 2 AP25H
- Memory: 1 GB RAM
- Storage: 4 GB ROM
- Removable storage: microSD (up to 2 GB), microSDHC (up to 32 GB)
- Battery: 1,500 mAh
- Rear camera: 8.0 MP CMOS
- Front camera: 0.3 MP CMOS
- Display: 4.0 in (100 mm) IPS WVGA (800×480 pixels), 16.77M colors
- Model: LGI11 (KS1001)
- Made in: South Korea

The LG Optimus X is an Android smartphone manufactured and designed by LG Electronics and released by KDDI under the au IS series brand.

== History ==
The device was certified by the Federal Communications Commission (FCC) certification on November 30, 2011. It was officially announced by KDDI and LG Electronics Japan on January 16, 2012, and subsequently went on sale nationwide across Japan on January 20, 2012.

An update to Android 4.0 was released on August 10, 2012. Sales of the smartphone were officially discontinued in November 2012.

== Specifications ==
=== Hardware ===
The phone features a 4.0-inch WVGA IPS LCD screen, powered by a 1.2 GHz dual-core NVIDIA Tegra 2 processor paired with Qualcomm MDM6600 modem support. It contains 1 GB RAM and 4 GB internal storage, expandable up to 32 GB via microSDHC. It includes an 8.0 MP main CMOS camera and a 0.3 MP front-facing camera, powered by a 1,500 mAh battery. Connected ports include microUSB, microHDMI, and a 3.5 mm audio jack.

=== Software ===
The smartphone launched with Android 2.3.7 and was later updated to Android 4.0. It features pre-installed applications including Skype au, au Disaster Countermeasures, LG SmartWorld, LG On-Screen Phone, Riptide GP, SmartShare, and 3LM Security.

== Known issues ==
- On February 16, 2012, an update was issued to address an issue where automatic email/SMS reception failed in certain areas, as well as a bug preventing the unit from turning on.
- On February 21, 2013, an update addressed an issue where callers could not hear each other's audio during a call.
- On April 15, 2013, a bug fix was provided for instances where the display failed to turn back on when resuming from sleep mode.
