= PhoneSat =

NASA satellite research project

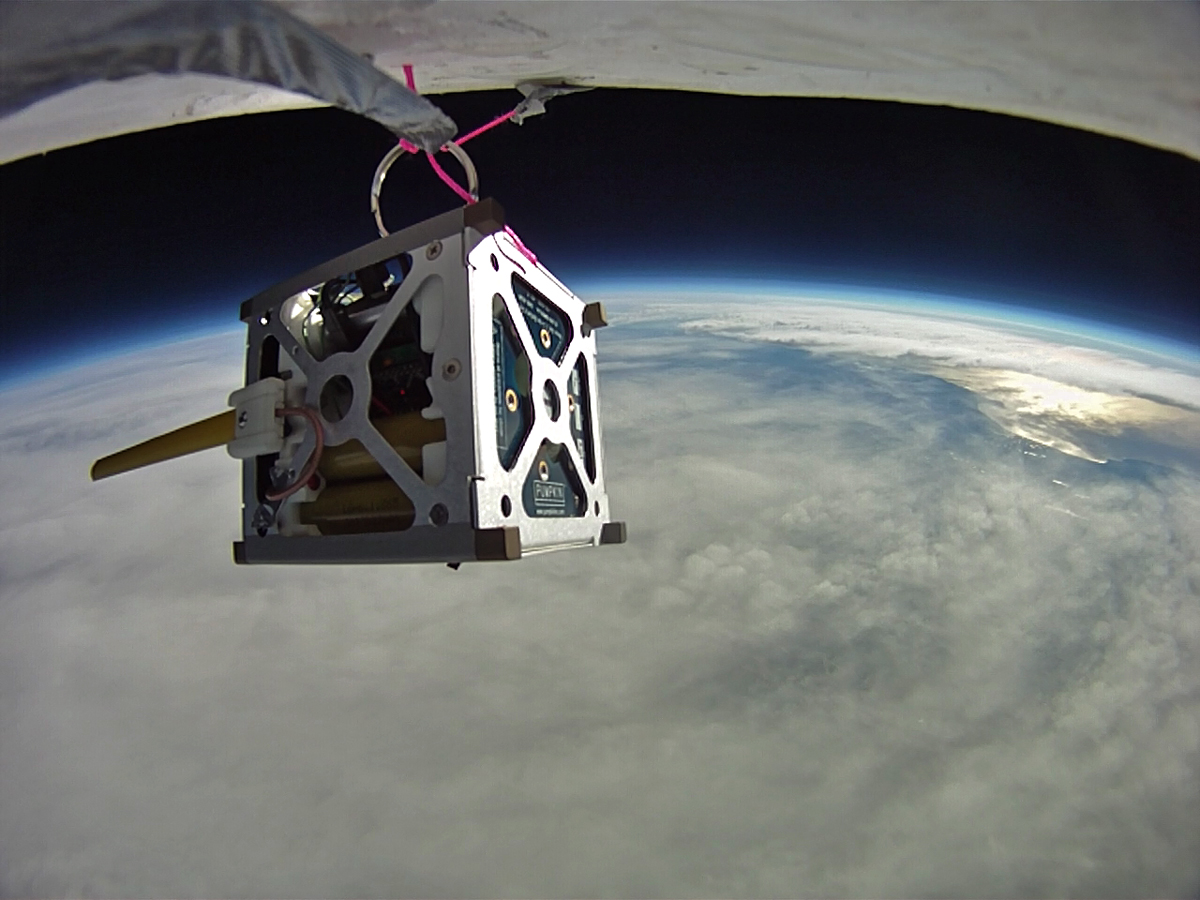
PhoneSat 1.0 during high-altitude balloon test. The antenna made from yellow tape measure is deployed.

PhoneSat is an ongoing NASA project of building nanosatellites using unmodified consumer-grade off-the-shelf smartphones and Arduino platform and launching them into Low Earth Orbit. This project is part of NASA's Small Spacecraft Technology Program and was started in 2009 at NASA Ames Research Center (Moffett Field, California).

When the project started, a typical smartphone had a faster CPU and more memory than the average satellite, one or two cameras, multiple acceleration and rotation sensors, a compass, a GPS receiver, radios, and a Li-Ion battery, all of which had benefited from significant research and development efforts and economy of scale in the telecommunications industry to reduce cost.

The construction cost of the first version of PhoneSat satellite was reported to be US$3,500 and that of the second version was reported to be below US$7,000. The chassis of all of the PhoneSat series is a single standard CubeSat bus and sized 10 cm × 10 cm × 10 cm (around 4 inches per side). Control software and firmware was made open source whenever possible.

The PhoneSat project was selected by Popular Science magazine as one of eleven "Best of What's New" in the aerospace category in 2012.

== Versions ==
=== PhoneSat 1.0 ===
PhoneSat 1.0 uses a Nexus One smartphone (HTC) as the onboard computer running the Android 2.3.3 operating system. This version has no solar panels and runs from energy stored in 12 lithium-ion (Li-Ion) batteries. The basic mission goal of PhoneSat 1.0 was to stay alive in space for a short period of time, sending back digital imagery of Earth and space via its camera, while also sending back information about the satellite's health. To prepare for such a mission, NASA tested PhoneSat 1.0 in various extreme environments, including thermal-vacuum chambers, alpha and beta radiation testing (no neutron testing), vibration and shock tables, sub-orbital rocket flights and high-altitude balloons

Two PhoneSat 1.0 satellites, named Graham and Bell, were launched. Graham was the basic PhoneSat 1.0 model. Bell was a PhoneSat 1.0 model with an Iridium transceiver mounted at one end (the Iridium component formed its own space mission, see TechEdSat 2).

Graham and Bell were launched into Low Earth Orbit on the maiden flight of the Antares launch vehicle on April 21, 2013, and operated successfully in space for a planned one-week mission, re-entering on April 27, 2013.

=== PhoneSat 2.0 ===
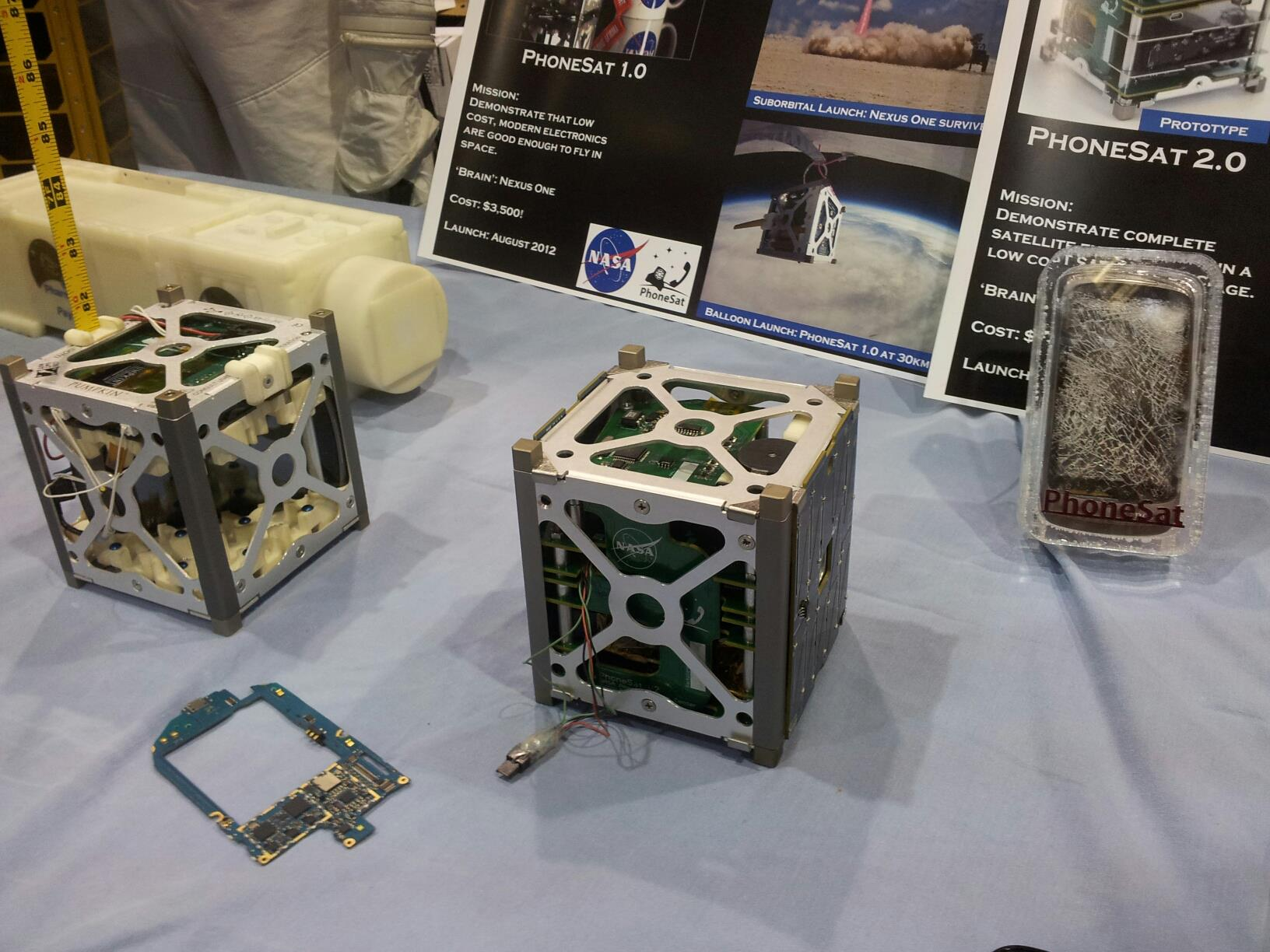
PhoneSat2.0 at Maker Faire 2012

PhoneSat 2.0 is built with a Nexus S smartphone (Samsung), running the Android 2.3.3 operating system. There is a two-way S band radio added by engineers to communicate with Earth, four Li-ion batteries, solar panels to recharge the batteries, and a GPS receiver. To control satellite orientation, several magnetorquer coils and reaction wheels were added.

The Alexander cubesat, also known as PhoneSat 2.0 Beta or PhoneSat v2a, was launched along with Graham and Bell on the Antares launch vehicle in 2013. The reason for the strange simultaneous launch of PhoneSats 1.0 and 2.0 beta is that the PhoneSats 1.0 launches were delayed until 2.0 beta was ready to launch.

=== PhoneSat 2.4 and PhoneSat 2.5 ===
PhoneSat 2.4 and 2.5, both 1-U cubesats, included a two-way S-band radio, allowing engineers to command the satellite from Earth, and a system to control the orientation of the cubesat in space.

Phonesat 2.4 was launched in November 2013 on a Minotaur-1 booster with the Educational Launch of Nanosatellites (ELaNa)-4 mission.

PhoneSat 2.5 was launched on a Falcon-9 on April 18, 2014 on the ELaNa-5 mission.

=== Follow-on projects ===
The PhoneSat bus was used in several other projects. The follow-on project, Edison Demonstration of Smallsat Networks (EDSN), was an 8-satellite constellation of 1.5-U cubesats based on the PhoneSat 3.0 architecture. However, EDSN did not make orbit, launching on the failed Super Strypi mission in November 2015. KickSat also used PhoneSat architecture.

The PhoneSat concept, and most of the team, established a NASA Technology Transfer to create Planet Labs in San Francisco.

PhoneSat 3.0 onwards replaced the phone circuit boards with an Intel Edison and continue to be launched as a hosted payload on the TechEdSat series at NASA Ames. The costly S-band radios have been replaced by cheap commercial WiFi dongles, and the faster processing speed allows software experiments such as improved satellite-to-satellite communications architectures for delay tolerant networking, atomic clock timekeeping experiments and on-orbit trajectory prediction, control and targeting necessary for TechEdSat's SPQR exobrake, utilizing the PhoneSat 5.0 avionics on the Intel Edison microprocessor.

== Launches ==
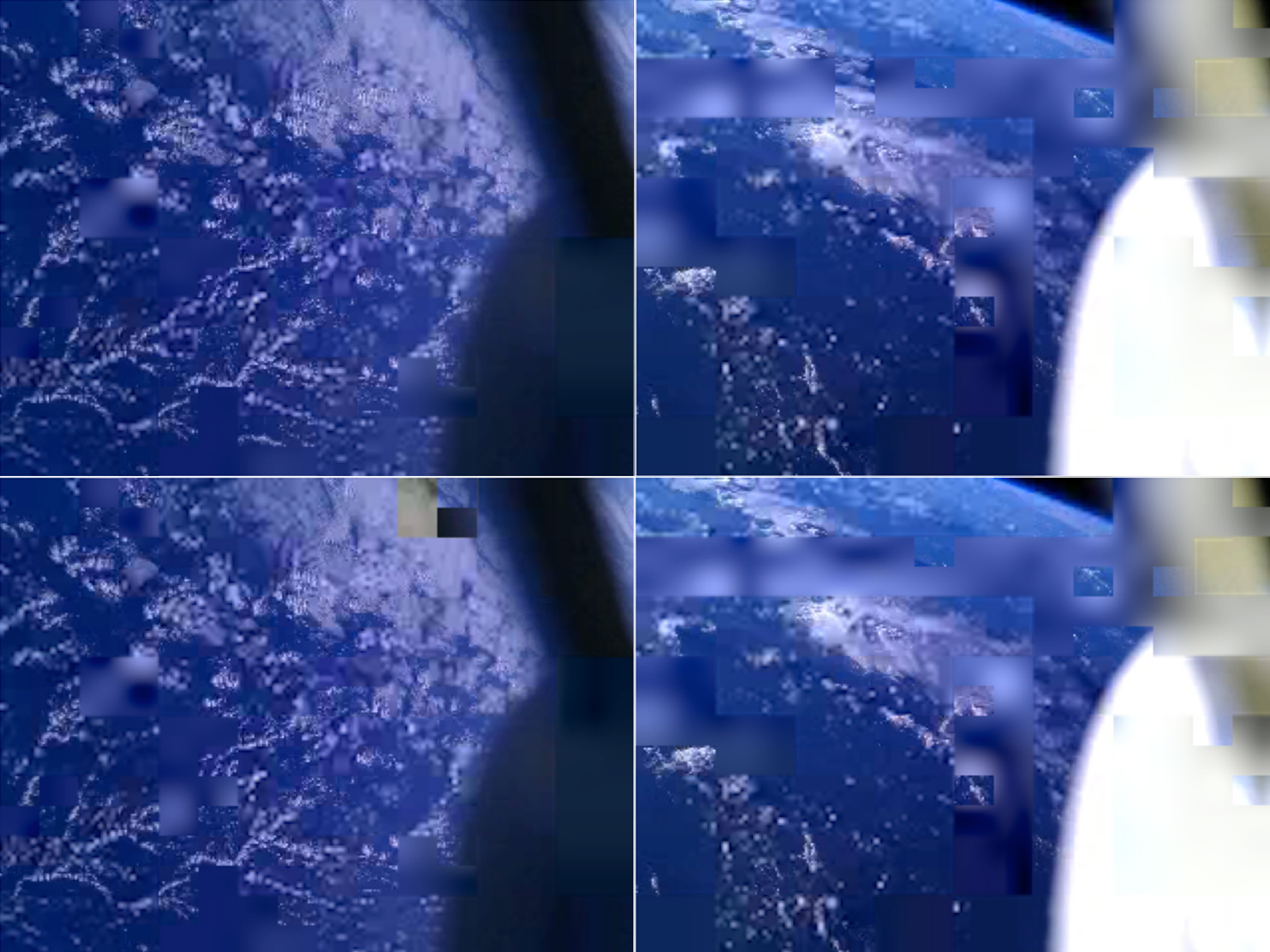
Four pictures from PhoneSats, launched in April 2013. Artifacts are visible due to lost or misdecoded "image-data packets".

Three NASA PhoneSats were launched aboard the Antares 110 A-ONE rocket at 21 April 2013, 21:00 UTC from MARS LP-0A. Two were PhoneSats 1.0, named Graham and Bell; and one was a PhoneSat 2.0, named Alexander. They were named after Alexander Graham Bell. They have masses of 2.8 pounds (1.25 kg), 2.9 pounds (1.3 kg), and 3.14 pounds (1.426 kg). All three had deorbited on 27 April 2013, according to the PhoneSat team. Several pictures were downloaded from them by radio amateurs and NASA Ames PhoneSat team.

PhoneSat 2.4 launched in November 2013 aboard the Minotaur I ORS-3 rocket at 20 November 2013, 01:15 UTC from MARS LP-0B. It re-entered the atmosphere on January 31, 2017 after three years and two months in orbit

PhoneSat 2.5 launched on April 18, 2014, 19:25 UTC as a piggyback payload aboard SpaceX Falcon 9 v1.1 rocket, with orbital decay and subsequent reentry on May 14, 2014.

== See also ==
- STRaND-1 — another CubeSat with a smartphone
