= Holo (design language) =

Discontinued design language developed by Google

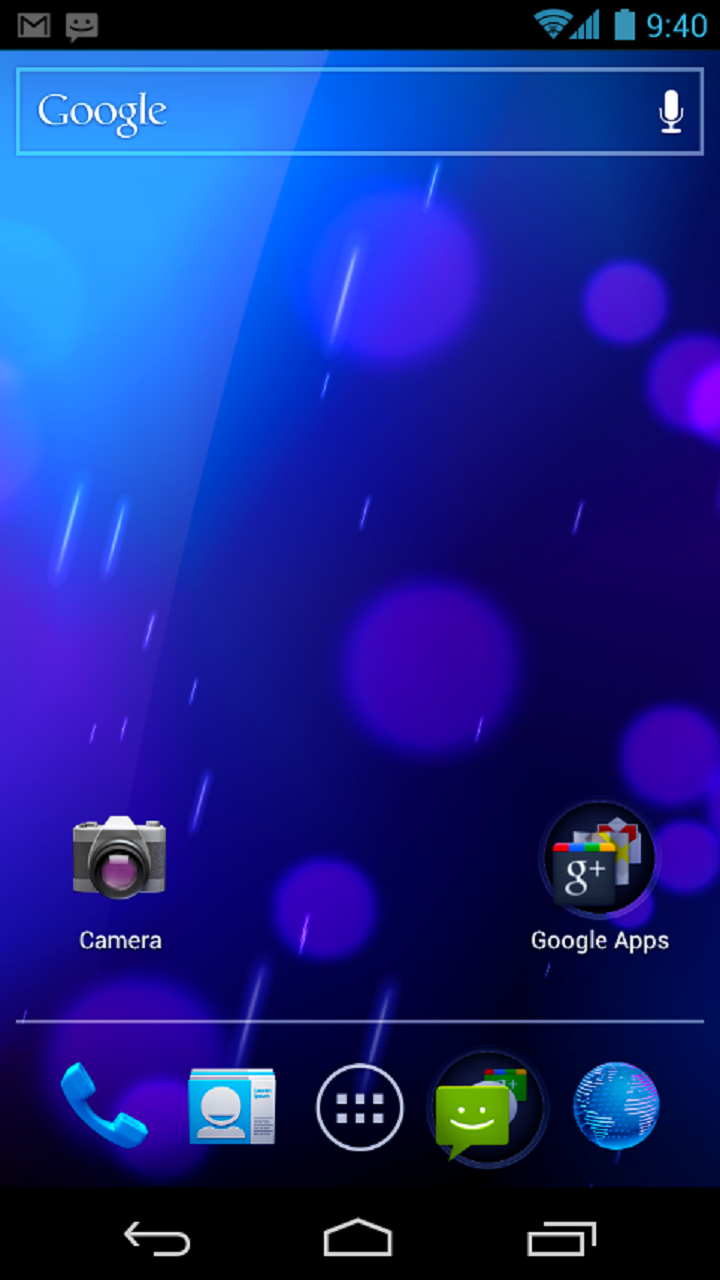
- Homescreen of Android Ice Cream Sandwich on a Galaxy Nexus
- Developer: Google
- Initial release: October 19, 2011; 14 years ago
- Platform: Android
- Predecessor: Android Honeycomb
- Successor: Material Design

Holo is a discontinued design language developed by Google for the Android operating system. Google described it as a theme rather than a design language.

Holo first appeared in Android Ice Cream Sandwich, evolving from the user interface introduced by Android Honeycomb. Still, the same futuristic aesthetics of Android Honeycomb were used in favor of flat design with neon blue accenting, hard edges, and drop shadows. Holo also introduced a new default system font, Roboto; designed to replace the Droid font family, Roboto was primarily optimized for use on high-resolution mobile displays.

Google discontinued Holo in 2014 and it was replaced by its successor Material Design in Android Lollipop. Material Design is also used in Google Workspace apps.

== Updates ==
=== Android 4.4 KitKat ===
Android KitKat's user interface further downgraded the Holo interface appearance used on 4.0 and later until 4.3, replacing most instances of blue accenting with grey and white.

The appearance may vary across custom vendor distributions, such as Samsung TouchWiz.
