= Bell (satellite) =

NASA phone-based satellite series

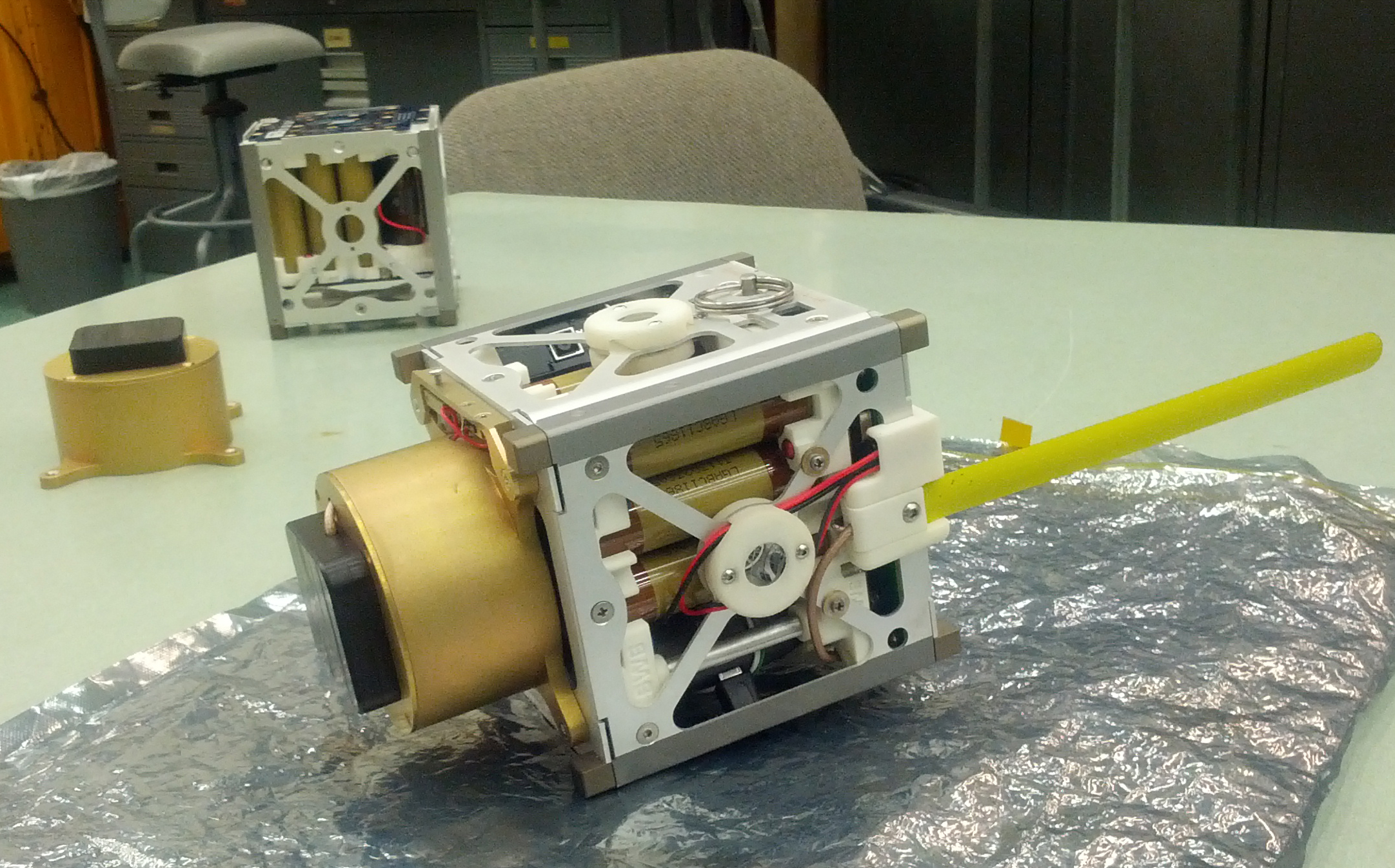
- Mission type: Technology
- Operator: NASA
- COSPAR ID: 2013-016D
- SATCAT no.: 39145
- Mission duration: 2 weeks

Spacecraft properties
- Spacecraft type: 1U CubeSat
- Bus: PhoneSat-1.0
- Manufacturer: NASA; Spaceflight Services; ISIS
- Launch mass: 0.5 kilograms (1.1 lb)

Start of mission
- Launch date: 21 April 2013, 21:00 UTC
- Rocket: Antares 110 A-ONE
- Launch site: MARS LP-0A
- Contractor: Orbital Sciences

End of mission
- Decay date: 27 April 2013

Orbital parameters
- Reference system: Geocentric
- Regime: Low Earth
- Inclination: 51.6266 degrees

Bell, also known as PhoneSat 1.0b or PhoneSat v1b was a technology demonstration satellite operated by NASA's Ames Research Center, which was launched in April 2013. Part of the PhoneSat programme, it was one of the first three PhoneSat spacecraft to be launched.

A PhoneSat-1.0 satellite, Bell was built to the single-unit (1U) CubeSat specification, and measures 10 centimetres (3.9 in) in each dimension. The satellite is based on an off-the-shelf HTC Nexus One smartphone which serves in place of an onboard computer and avionics system. Unlike the more advanced PhoneSat-2.0 spacecraft, Bell is powered by non-rechargeable batteries, and has no attitude control system, however onboard sensors can be used to determine and monitor the satellite's attitude. The cameras built into the phones aboard Bell and its sister satellite Graham have been used to return images of the Earth from space.

Unlike Graham, Bell has an external Iridium modem attached to one of its side. Independent battery can supply power for the modem for 2–3 days.

Bell was named after Alexander Graham Bell, the inventor of the telephone. The two other PhoneSat spacecraft launched aboard the same rocket were named Alexander and Graham. The three PhoneSat spacecraft, along with the commercial Dove 1 satellite, were launched as secondary payloads aboard the maiden flight of the Antares carrier rocket; flight A-ONE. The primary payload was the Cygnus Mass Simulator.

Liftoff occurred at 21:00 UTC on 21 April 2013, from Pad 0A of the Mid-Atlantic Regional Spaceport, following attempts on 17 and 20 April which had been scrubbed due to an umbilical problem and high-level winds respectively. The launch was conducted by Orbital Sciences Corporation, however the CubeSats were launched under a contract with Spaceflight Services, using dispensers produced by ISIS. Alexander, Graham and Bell were deployed from a single ISIPod dispenser, while Dove 1 was deployed from a second such dispenser.

On 27 April 2013 the satellite was confirmed to have burned up in the atmosphere, with instruments still running up until then.
