= Galaxy Nexus =

Smartphone designed by Google and Samsung

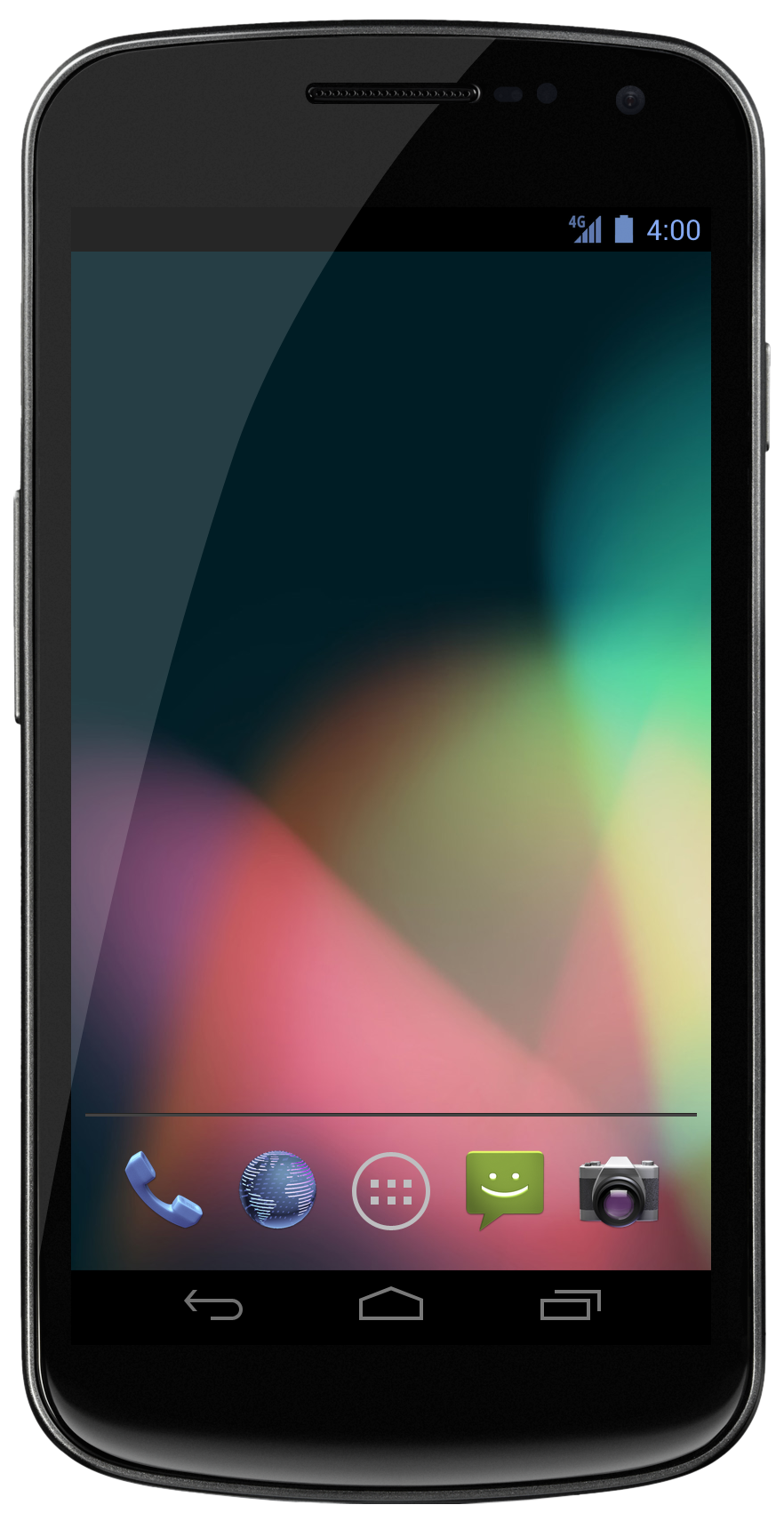
- Galaxy Nexus running Android 4.1
- Developer: Google; Samsung Electronics
- Manufacturers: Google and Samsung Electronics
- Type: Smartphone
- Series: Google Nexus, Samsung Galaxy
- Family: Google Nexus
- First released: 17 November 2011; 15 years ago
- Discontinued: 29 October 2012
- Predecessor: Nexus S
- Successor: Nexus 4
- Related: Samsung Galaxy S II; Samsung Galaxy Note
- Compatible networks: GSM/GPRS/EDGE 850/900/1800/1900; HSPA 850/900/1700/1900/2100; HSDPA 21 Mbit/s; HSUPA 5.76 Mbit/s; LTE + CDMA2000 EV-DO Rev.A (Verizon, Sprint)
- Form factor: Slate
- Dimensions: Height: 135.5 mm (5.33 in); Width: 67.94 mm (2.675 in); Depth: 8.94 mm (0.352 in) or 9.47 mm (0.373 in) for the LTE variant
- Weight: 135 g (4.8 oz)
- Operating system: Original: Android 4.0.1 "Ice Cream Sandwich"; Last: Android 4.3 "Jelly Bean" (4.2 for Verizon's Toro variant)
- System-on-chip: Texas Instruments OMAP 4460
- CPU: 1.2 GHz dual-core ARM Cortex-A9
- GPU: 307 MHz PowerVR SGX540
- Memory: 1 GB
- Storage: 16/32 GB (depending on versions)
- Removable storage: None
- Battery: 1,750 mAh (HSPA+ version); 1,850 mAh (LTE version) internal user-replaceable 2,000 mAh (Official extended battery. Korean variants includes both 1,750 mAh and 2,000 mAh batteries); 2,100 mAh (Sprint/Verizon Extended Battery. Wider than the GSM model). rechargeable Li-ion
- Rear camera: 5 MP (2592×1936 px) Autofocus, zero shutter lag, single LED flash 1080p video recording (1920×1080 @ 24 fps)
- Front camera: 1.3 MP, 720p video (1280×720 @ 30 fps) Video: MP4, H.264, H.263, WebM
- Display: 4.65 in (118 mm) diagonal HD Super AMOLED with RGBG-Matrix (PenTile) 1280×720 px *(316 ppi); 16:9 aspect-ratio 10 μs response time
- Connectivity: 3.5 mm TRRS GPS; DLNA; Micro USB 2.0 with USB On-The-Go; MHL; Bluetooth 3.0; NFC Wi-Fi 802.11a/b/g/n (2.4/5 GHz)
- Data inputs: Multi-touch capacitive touchscreen, accelerometer, 3-axis gyroscope, A-GPS, barometer, 3-axis digital compass, proximity sensor, dual microphones for active noise cancellation
- Codename: Maguro; Toro (Verizon version); Toroplus (Sprint version)
- SAR: GT-I9250: Head: 0.43 W/kg (1 g) Body: 0.74 W/kg (1 g) Hotspot: 0.74 W/kg (1 g); GT-I9250M: Head: 0.4 W/kg (1 g) Body: 0.65 W/kg (1 g) Hotspot: 0.74 W/kg (1 g); GT-I9250T: Head: 0.36 W/kg (1 g) Body: 0.49 W/kg (1 g) Hotspot: 0.63 W/kg (1 g)
- Hearing aid compatibility: M4
- Other: Wi-Fi hotspot Wi-Fi Direct; USB tethering Oleophobic display coating

The Galaxy Nexus (GT-I9250) is a touchscreen-enabled Android-based smartphone co-developed by Google and Samsung Electronics. It is the third smartphone in the Google Nexus series, a family of Android consumer devices built by an original equipment manufacturer partner. The phone is the successor to Google's previous flagship phones, the Nexus One and Nexus S.

The Galaxy Nexus has a high-definition (1280 × 720) Super AMOLED display with a Dragontrail curved glass surface, an improved camera, and was the first Android version 4.0 Ice Cream Sandwich device. The name is the result of co-branding between the Samsung Galaxy and Google Nexus brands of Android smartphones. The device is known as the Galaxy X in Brazil, however, due to a trademark on the "Nexus" brand.

The Galaxy Nexus was unveiled jointly by Google and Samsung on 19 October 2011, in Hong Kong. It was released in Europe on 17 November 2011. The Galaxy Nexus was available for sale on the Google Play Store until 29 October 2012, when it was succeeded by the LG Nexus 4.

== History ==
Google's plans to continue the Nexus series and bring a third-generation Nexus to market were confirmed by Google's senior vice president of mobile platforms Andy Rubin in May 2011. Samsung mobile put out a teaser video for its "Google Episode" of Unpacked on 11 October but later postponed (to 19 October) the product announcement out of respect, following the death of former Apple CEO Steve Jobs on 5 October.

Before the official announcement, it was also referred to as the Google Nexus Prime by the general public and the media. There had been repeated leaks containing almost accurate details about this device. The phone was officially announced on 19 October 2011, in Hong Kong, revealing the official name as "Galaxy Nexus".

== Hardware ==
The Galaxy Nexus hosts support for MHL through the use of its USB hardware 2.0 port, allowing the Galaxy Nexus to output up to 1080p Audiovisual content (through HDMI) to any supported external display such as a HD Television. USB port supports both host and devices modes (OTG); as a note, its successor Nexus 4 supports only the device mode. The Galaxy Nexus has no physical buttons on the front, but instead features on-screen soft keys embedded into the system software (part of Android 4.0). Beneath the soft keys, a multicolored notification LED is featured, a feature missing from the Nexus S. There is no SD card support.

== Software ==
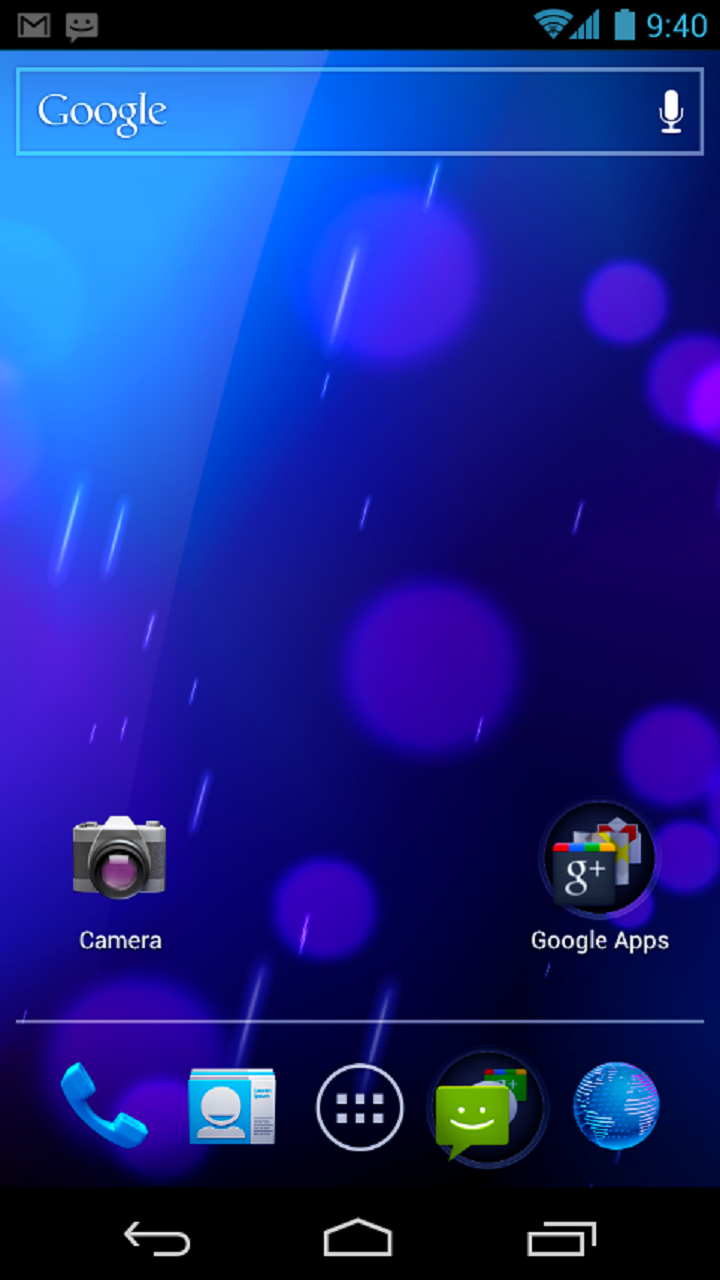
Android 4.0, the original operating system of the Galaxy Nexus

The Galaxy Nexus was the first device to run Android 4.0 Ice Cream Sandwich, introducing a large number of new features, bug fixes, and improvements. Beginning from 11 July 2012, Android 4.1 Jelly Bean began rolling out to the GSM Galaxy Nexus as an over-the-air (OTA) update. The 4.2 update began rolling out on 13 November 2012, to the GSM Galaxy Nexus Takju/Maguro variant (smartphones sold in the US and directly supported by Google) as an (OTA) update. Google started rolling out the update to the international version (Yakju/Maguro) a week later. Towards the end of December, however, not all phones had received the update. On 19 March 2013, Verizon Wireless began updating OTA their CDMA Galaxy Nexus Mysid/Toro variant to Android 4.2.2.

Android 4.3 Jelly Bean was released for GSM models on 24 July 2013, and Sprint began OTA updates on 31 October 2013.

Google has stated that the Galaxy Nexus will not receive Android 4.4 KitKat, even after having 14,000 signatures requesting it. New drivers may allow unofficial Android versions to be available for the device.

Canonical's Ubuntu Touch operating system was available and supported on the Galaxy Nexus, however, support for the Galaxy Nexus was soon discontinued on 13 January 2014.

Android 7.1 ("Nougat") was unofficially ported to the Galaxy Nexus.

=== Google Wallet ===
The Galaxy Nexus is one of the few devices that officially supported Google Wallet, Google's predecessor to the NFC based Android Pay electronic payment system. The Verizon variant is the only variant that did not offer official Google Wallet support. This unsupported feature caused a controversy among US users with Verizon defending its actions by reasoning that the Galaxy Nexus uses a "secure element." It was possible to sideload Google Wallet and it would install and function correctly. Care must be taken when using aftermarket batteries to be sure it has near field communication ability, since the NFC antenna is located in the battery.

== Availability ==
In some countries, the Samsung Galaxy Nexus is sold SIM-unlocked. It is also hardware-unlocked (unlocked bootloader, allowing root access). The fact that the Galaxy Nexus is sold SIM-locked in some markets—primarily where operators subsidize the phone or have exclusive selling rights—breaks the more liberal tradition of previous Nexus phones: the Nexus One and the Nexus S.

=== Asia–Pacific ===
On 3 May 2012, Samsung India officially announced that India will not have the official release of the Samsung Galaxy Nexus, despite numerous earlier reports that the device would be launched as early as mid-December 2011. The Galaxy Nexus was released in Indonesia on 21 January 2012, the Philippines on 28 January 2012, Bahrain on 4 March 2012, and Saudi Arabia in March 2012.

=== Europe ===
In the United Kingdom, the EHSPA+ version of the Galaxy Nexus became available on O2 and 3 on 17 November 2011. In Germany, the EHSPA+ version was sold SIM-unlocked from Vodafone and O2. It launched in December 2011 in Portugal, by Vodafone.

=== North America ===
In Canada, the device was launched on 8 December 2011. The Canadian model was sold unlocked and supports GSM/UMTS/HSPA/AWS bands. A GSM/UMTS, SIM-unlocked version was officially released in the United States by Google in the Google Play Store. Sprint Corporation officially announced the Galaxy Nexus for their network at CES 2012, and was released on 22 April 2012, as one of Sprint Corporation's first LTE smartphones. On 24 April 2012, the Galaxy Nexus was sold SIM-unlocked on Google's Play Store for $399.99 then dropped to $349.99 later. The only difference between this variant and the internationally sold variant is the inclusion of "Google Wallet" out of the box.

==== Brief sales ban ====
On 29 June 2012, Apple Inc. was granted a request for a pre-trial injunction against the import and sale to the U.S. of Galaxy Nexus by Samsung. The order was issued by U.S. District Judge Lucy Koh in San Jose, California. The ruling was based primarily on a patent which is defined as a "universal interface for retrieval of information in a computer system". The injunction against Samsung took effect when Apple paid a $96 million bond that will be used to cover damages done to Samsung if Apple loses the case. The Galaxy Nexus was temporarily unavailable for purchase on Google's Play store, and Google stated they would push a software update that would remove local phone searching. On 6 July the ban was lifted.

== Variants ==
The device was originally only available in black, developed under the codename "Tuna". A white version (with the front-panel in black) was made available in February 2012. There was a special edition released to Google employees with a unique back cover.

Because the device was designed to work with carriers utilizing different network technologies, there are several hardware variations of the Galaxy Nexus:

- SCH-I515 "Toro": Verizon Wireless's variant featuring 4G LTE connectivity in the 700 MHz band (Band 13) as well as CDMA/EV-DO Rev. A connectivity in the PCS bands (800/1900 MHz). This device features either 16 or 32 GB of on-board storage, measures 9.47 mm thick, and features a 1850 mAh battery. This device's appearance is similar to that of the international version.
- GT-I9250 "Maguro": GSM/HSPA+ variant. Features support for both AT&T's and T-Mobile's HSPA+ bands in the United States. This particular variant was sold SIM-unlocked by Google in the Play Store.
- SPH-L700 "Toro Plus": Sprint's variant featuring 4G LTE connectivity in the 1900 MHz band (Band 25). It is virtually identical to the Verizon variant, save for the omission of the SIM slot, and minor cosmetic differences.
- GT-I9250T: Australian GSM/HSPA+ variant. Complies with Australian regulatory requirements and the baseband is tuned to prefer 3G 850 MHz. This particular variant was sold by Optus, Telstra, and Vodafone.
- SHW-M420S/K: Korean GSM/HSPA+ variant. Complies with Korean regulatory requirements, like a camera shutter sound. This particular variant was sold by SKT and KT.
- SC-04D/SGH-N044: Japanese NTT Docomo's variant

== Accessories ==
The official Samsung accessory range includes a Desktop Dock with an HDMI port, a Desk Stand with a 3.5 mm jack, a stand with a charging port for a second battery, and a car dock that will let users turn their Galaxy Nexus phone into a SatNav replacement. The phone featured a set of pogo pins for connectivity with some accessories, including the car dock. All of the Samsung accessories feature a USB hardware port so the phone can be charged while it is being used.

== Reception ==
The Galaxy Nexus generated a high level of anticipation, and received very positive reviews upon release. Engadget's Myriam Joire praised the phone's speed, feel, display, and battery life. Joire concluded that at the time of writing, the Galaxy Nexus is "the best Android phone available today" further concluding that it's "possibly even the best phone available today, period". Ginny Mies of PCWorld echoed the previous statement, while saying that the Samsung Galaxy Nexus is "a superb phone, and a great vehicle for introducing Android Ice Cream Sandwich to the world". Despite writing that Android has "a long way" to go, in terms of progression, the tweaks and updates Google has implemented throughout the operating system substantially improves the efficiency and ease of use of the operating system.

In their review, Mobilesyrup lauded the phone, saying "there is no going back". They praised its aesthetics, noting that the Galaxy Nexus combined design elements of the Nexus S and Samsung Galaxy S II. Although the Galaxy Nexus's OMAP SoC was clocked lower and used a last-generation GPU while pushing a HD (720p) screen with 40% more pixels, compared to the Galaxy S II and other competitors powered by the Snapdragon S3 with lower resolution screens (typically qHD (540p)), the Galaxy Nexus showed no slowdown or app instability while frequently outperforming contemporary smartphones in both benchmarks and real-world usage. They also praised its software, as the "experience is just that much better", declaring the phone as "the first best Android device ever."

Engadget's Darren Murph, described Ice Cream Sandwich as "smooth as ever" further saying that "without question, this is easily the slickest, most polished version of Android yet". Murph was overall "thrilled with how the first Ice Cream Sandwich handset has turned out." with its "understated, sleek, beautiful" continuing with lauding the phone's display. Vincent Nguyen, from Static Media noted the fast performance of Android 4.0.1, the tight integration between the operating system and the hardware and concluded that "this is the best Android phone around today". J.R. Raphael of Computerworld, stated "The Galaxy Nexus [...] is an exceptional phone, arguably the finest Android handset to date", saying it is "sleek and attractive, with a thin, light body and a beautiful HD display". Raphael ended the review writing that the Galaxy Nexus is "screamingly fast [...] delivering what may be the best overall performance of any mobile device available".

In a T3 review, Thomas Tamblyn noted the primary (rear-facing) camera was "quicker than many digital cameras", and praised the phone's experience to be "very fluid" and that "it feels like a version of Android that is already very polished." The Verge's Joshua Topolsky stated the phone is one of the "best smartphones ever made, and with a couple of minor tweaks (particularly to the camera), it could be the best smartphone ever produced." Charlie White, at Mashable, described the screen as "gorgeous", offering "an exquisitely sharp view", and describing the hardware design as "a spectacular success", concluding the Galaxy Nexus "is by far the best Android phone I’ve seen yet".
