= Brik-II (satellite) =

Royal Netherlands Air and Space Force satellite

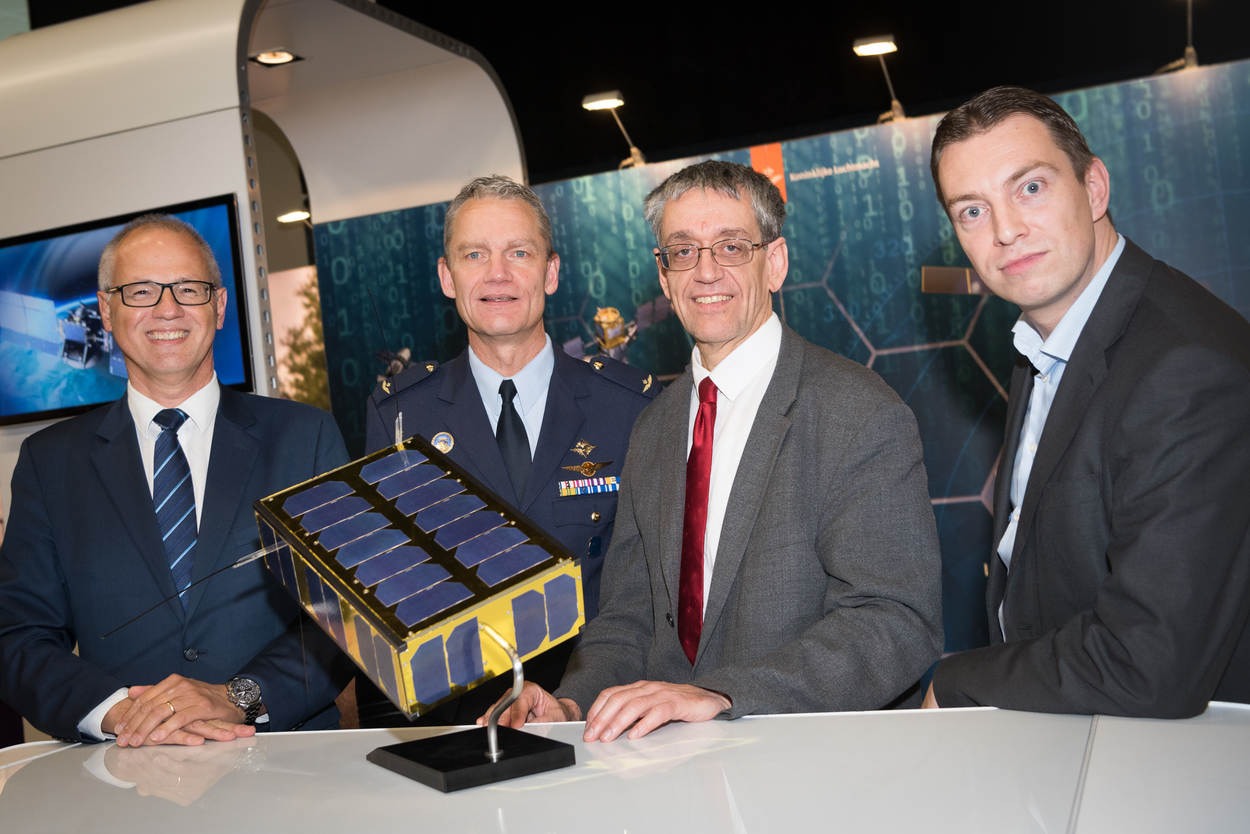
- The representatives of the 4 participating parties with a model of the Brik-II satellite.
- Mission type: Communication
- Operator: Royal Netherlands Air and Space Force
- COSPAR ID: 2021-058F
- SATCAT no.: 48876
- Mission duration: 3 years (planned)

Spacecraft properties
- Spacecraft type: Nanosatellite
- Manufacturer: ISISpace, NLR and TU Delft
- Launch mass: <10kg

Expedition
- Began: UTC

Start of mission
- Launch date: 30 June 2021
- Rocket: LauncherOne
- Contractor: Virgin Orbit

Brik-II is the first satellite of the Royal Netherlands Air Force, now called the Royal Netherlands Air and Space Force. On 30 November 2017, former Dutch Air Force Commander Dennis Luyt signed a contract with ISISpace, NLR and TU Delft. The nanosatellite is designed to provide the Royal Netherlands Air Force with intelligence regarding navigation, communication and observation of the Earth. The satellite was launched on 30 June 2021 by Virgin Orbit's LauncherOne.

== Namesake ==
The Brik-II satellite is named after the first airplane of the Royal Netherlands Air Force, named 'Brik'.
