= Alexander (satellite) =

Technology demonstration satellite

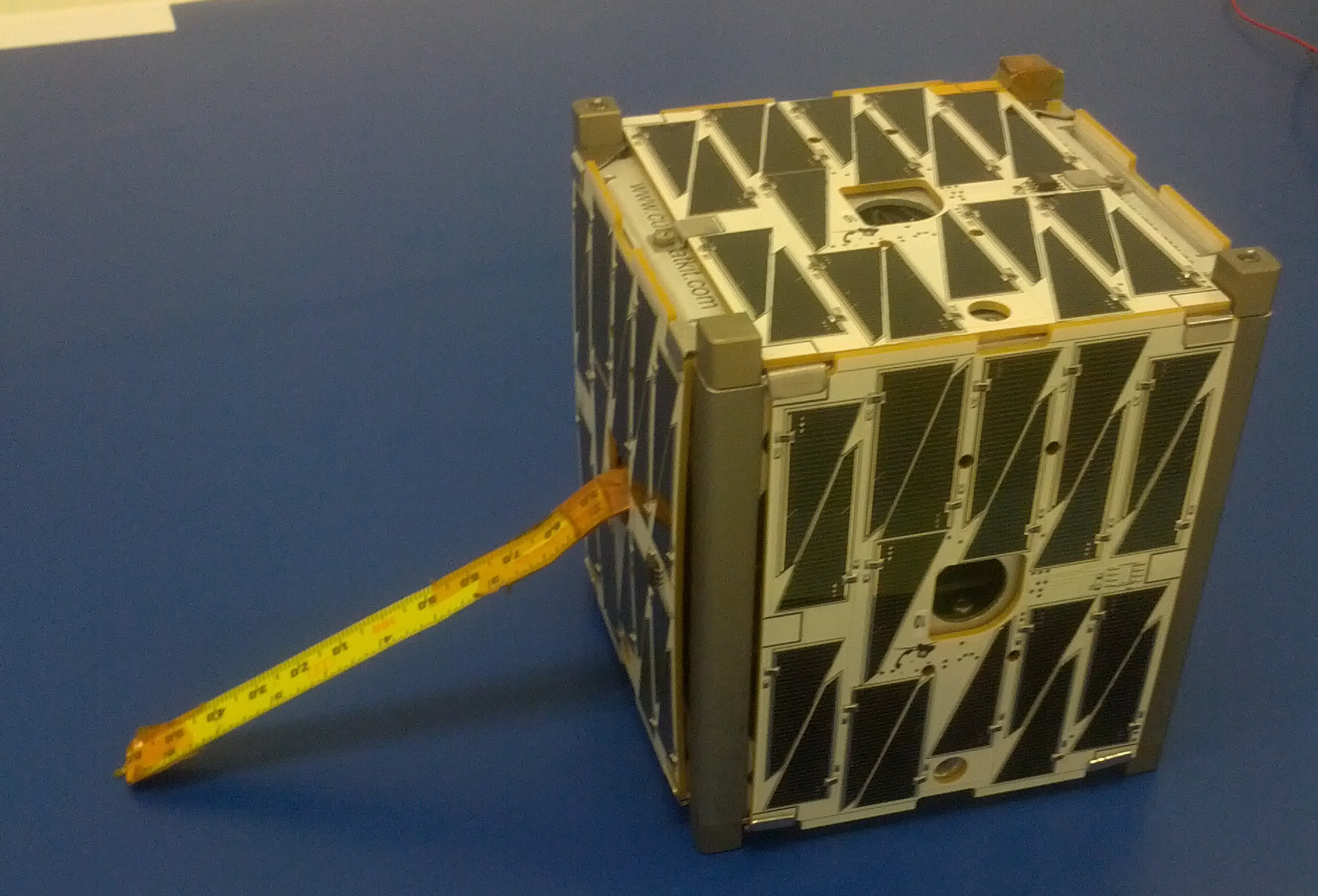
- Alexander satellite
- Mission type: Technology demonstration
- Operator: NASA Ames Research Center
- COSPAR ID: 2013-016C
- SATCAT no.: 39144
- Mission duration: 7 days (planned); 6 days (achieved)

Spacecraft properties
- Spacecraft type: CubeSat
- Bus: PhoneSat-2.0
- Manufacturer: NASA Ames Research Center; Spaceflight Industries; ISIS
- Launch mass: 0.5 kg (1.1 lb)

Start of mission
- Launch date: 21 April 2013, 21:00 UTC
- Rocket: Antares 110 A-ONE
- Launch site: Wallops Island MARS, LP-0A
- Contractor: Orbital Sciences

End of mission
- Decay date: 27 April 2013

Orbital parameters
- Reference system: Geocentric orbit
- Regime: Low Earth orbit
- Perigee altitude: 218 km
- Apogee altitude: 228 km
- Inclination: 51.64°
- Period: 88.95 minutes

Alexander, also known as PhoneSat 2.0 Beta or PhoneSat v2a is a technology demonstration satellite operated by NASA's Ames Research Center, which was launched in April 2013. Part of the PhoneSat programme, it was one of the first three PhoneSat spacecraft, and the first Phonesat-2.0 satellite, to be launched.

A PhoneSat-2.0 satellite, Alexander was built to the single-unit (1U) CubeSat specification, and measures 10 cm (3.9 in) in each dimension. The satellite is based on an off-the-shelf Samsung Electronics Nexus S smartphone which serves in place of an onboard computer. The satellite is equipped with a two-way S-band transponder and solar cells for power generation. The spacecraft uses the phone's gyroscopes, along with a GPS receiver, to determine its position and orientation, and a system of reaction wheels and magnetorquer coils for attitude control.

Alexander was named after Alexander Graham Bell, the inventor of the telephone. The two other PhoneSat spacecraft launched aboard the same rocket were named Graham and Bell. The three PhoneSat spacecraft, along with the commercial Dove 1 satellite, were launched as secondary payloads aboard the maiden flight of the Antares launch vehicle; flight A-ONE. The primary payload was the Cygnus Mass Simulator.

Liftoff occurred at 21:00 UTC on 21 April 2013, from Pad 0A of the Mid-Atlantic Regional Spaceport (MARS), following attempts on 17 and 20 April which had been scrubbed due to an umbilical problem and high-level winds respectively. The launch was conducted by Orbital Sciences Corporation, however the CubeSats were launched under a contract with Spaceflight Services, using dispensers produced by Innovative Solutions In Space (ISIS). Alexander, Graham and Bell were deployed from a single ISIPod dispenser, while Dove 1 was deployed from a second such dispenser.

On 27 April 2013, the satellite was confirmed to have burned up in the atmosphere, with instruments still running up until then.
