= Antares A-ONE =

2013 American test spaceflight

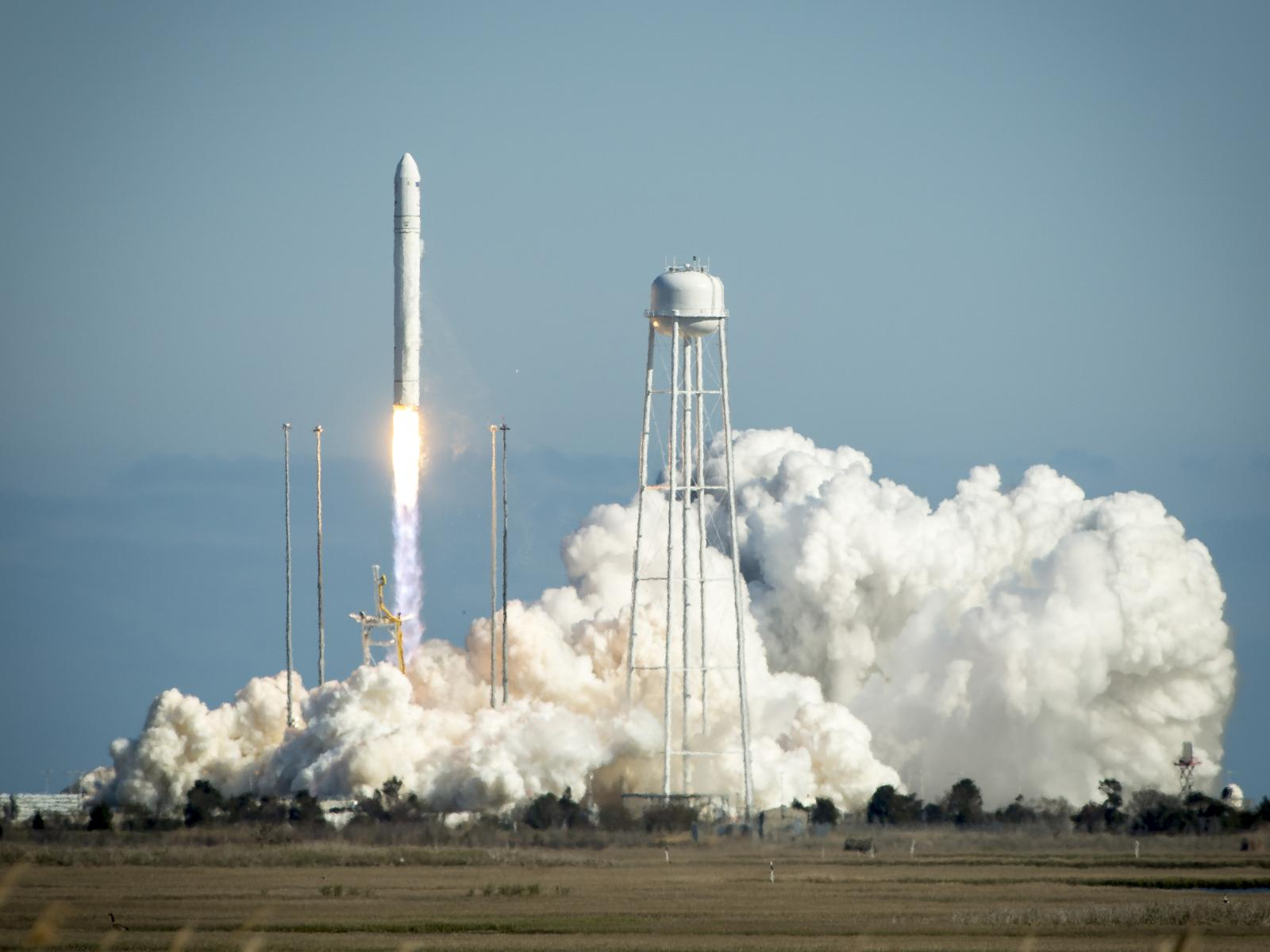
- The Antares 110 lifts off at the start of the mission
- Names: Simulated Cygnus Payload
- Mission type: Flight test
- Operator: Orbital Sciences Corporation
- COSPAR ID: 2013-016A
- SATCAT no.: 39142
- Mission duration: 18 days, 3 hours, 57 minutes

Spacecraft properties
- Spacecraft: Cygnus mass simulator
- Manufacturer: Orbital Sciences Corporation
- Launch mass: 3,800 kg (8,400 lb)
- Dimensions: 5.061 m × 2.896 m (16.60 ft × 9.50 ft)

Start of mission
- Launch date: 21 April 2013, 21:00:00 UTC (5:00 pm EDT)
- Rocket: Antares 110
- Launch site: MARS, Pad 0A

End of mission
- Disposal: Deorbited
- Decay date: 10 May 2013, 00:57 UTC

Orbital parameters
- Reference system: Geocentric orbit
- Regime: Low Earth orbit
- Perigee altitude: 223 km (139 mi)
- Apogee altitude: 237 km (147 mi)
- Inclination: 51.63°
- Orbital Sciences insignia Commercial Orbital Transportation Services

Antares A-ONE mission was the maiden flight of Orbital Sciences Corporation' Antares launch vehicle including the ascent to space and accurate delivery of a simulated payload, the Cygnus Mass Simulator (CMS), which was launched 21 April 2013. It was launched from Pad 0A at the Mid-Atlantic Regional Spaceport (MARS), Wallops Flight Facility, Virginia. The boilerplate payload simulated the mass of the Cygnus cargo spacecraft. This dummy payload was sent into an orbit of 223 km × 237 km (139 mi × 147 mi) with an orbital inclination of 51.63°, the same launch profile it will use for Orbital's Cygnus cargo supply missions to the International Space Station (ISS) for NASA.

This launch along with several other activities leading up to it, are paid milestones under NASA's Commercial Orbital Transportation Services (COTS) program.

== Primary payload ==
The primary payload was the Cygnus Mass Simulator. It had a height of 5.061 m (16.60 ft), a diameter of 2.896 m (9 ft 6.0 in) and a mass of 3,800 kg (8,400 lb). It was equipped with 22 accelerometers, 2 microphones, 12 digital thermometers, 24 thermocouples and 12 strain gages.

== Secondary payloads ==
Four Spaceflight Industries Inc. CubeSat nanosatellites were deployed from the dummy payload.

The secondary payloads were four CubeSats that were deployed from the CMS. Three of them were PhoneSats, 1U CubeSats built by NASA's Ames Research Center. These were named Alexander, Graham and Bell, after the Alexander Graham Bell, inventor of the telephone. The purpose of these three satellites was to demonstrate the use of smartphones as avionics in CubeSats. They each had a mass of 1,124 kg (2,478 lb) and were powered by lithium batteries. The fourth nanosat was a 3U CubeSat, called Dove-1, built by Cosmogia Inc. It carried a "technology development Earth imagery experiment" using the Earth's magnetic field for attitude control.

== Mission timeline ==
- Lift off of the Antares launch vehicle occurs two seconds after the first stage engines are ignited
- The first stage engines shut off 228 seconds after lift-off
- At 233 seconds, the first stage separates from the second
- At 317 seconds, the payload fairing is jettisoned
- At 326 seconds, the second stage's engine is ignited
- At 481 seconds, the second stage is shut off
- At 601 seconds, the Cygnus Mass Simulator separates

=== Launch attempt summary ===
Note: Times are local to the launch site (Eastern Daylight Time).

Attempt	Planned	Result	Turnaround	Reason	Decision point	Weather go (%)	Notes
1	17 Apr 2013, 5:00:00 pm	Scrubbed	—	Technical	17 Apr 2013, 4:44 pm (T−12:00)	60	Premature disconnect of upper stage umbilical cable during T−12:00 hold.
2	20 Apr 2013, 6:10:00 pm	Scrubbed	3 days 1 hour 10 minutes	Weather	20 Apr 2013, 4:30 pm	90	
3	21 Apr 2013, 5:00:00 pm	Success	0 days 22 hours 50 minutes			80	First flight of Antares.

== Gallery ==
Antares A-ONE
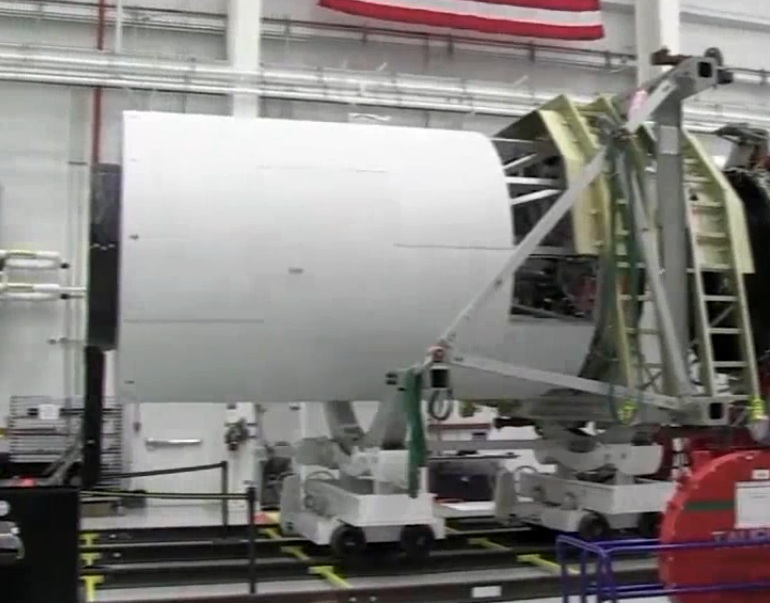
Cygnus mass simulator

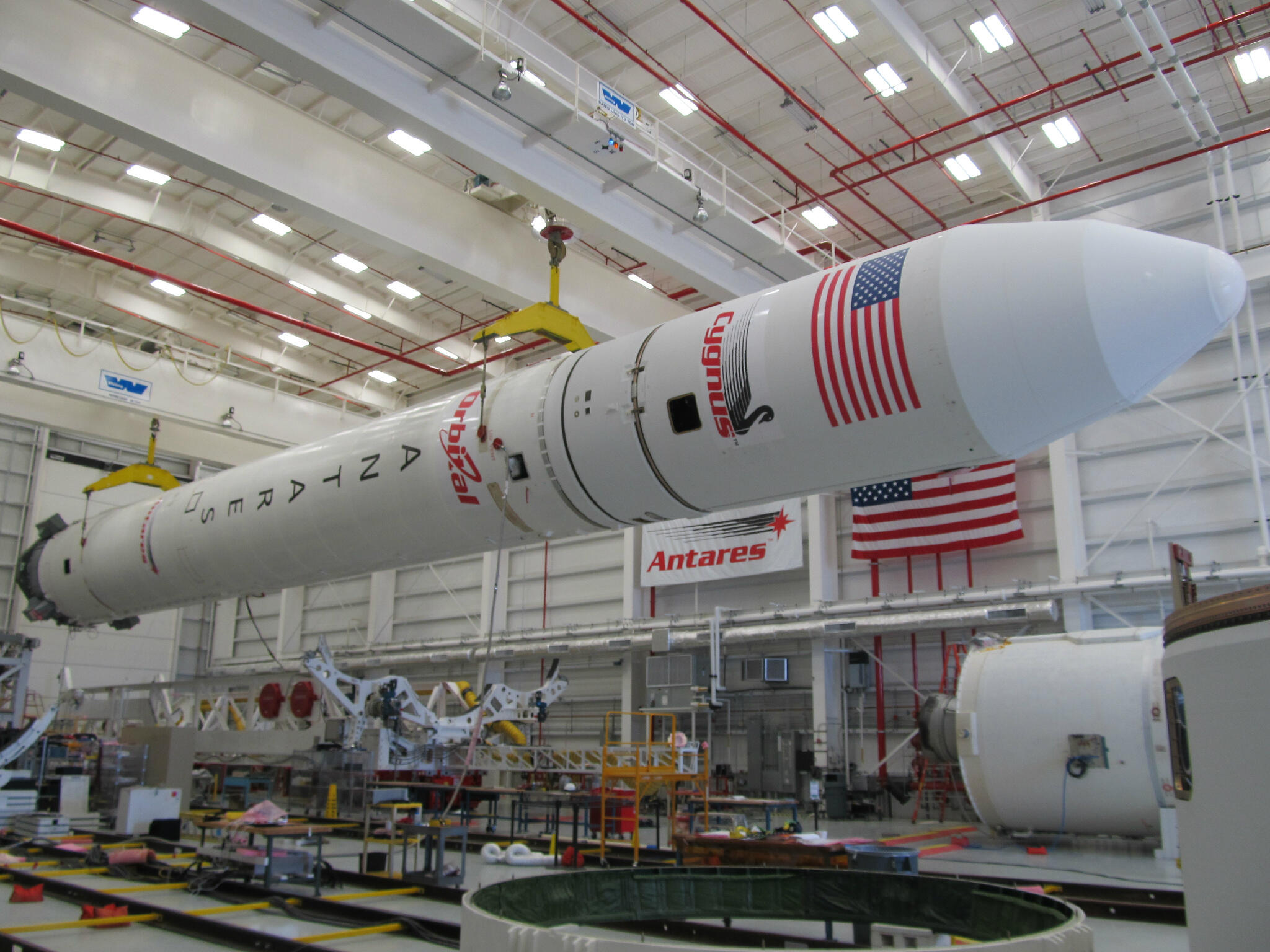
Integrated Antares rocket

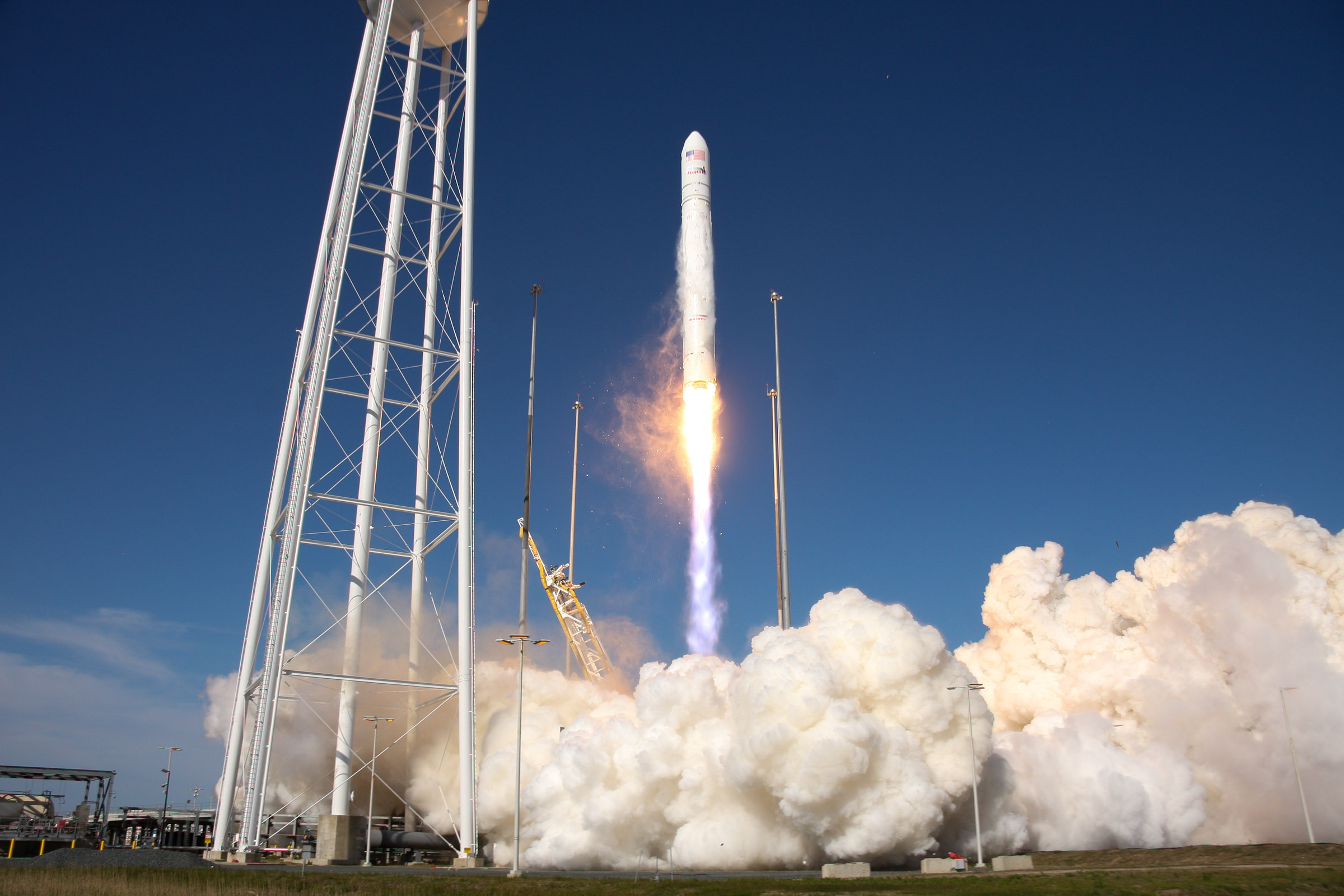
Launch of A-ONE

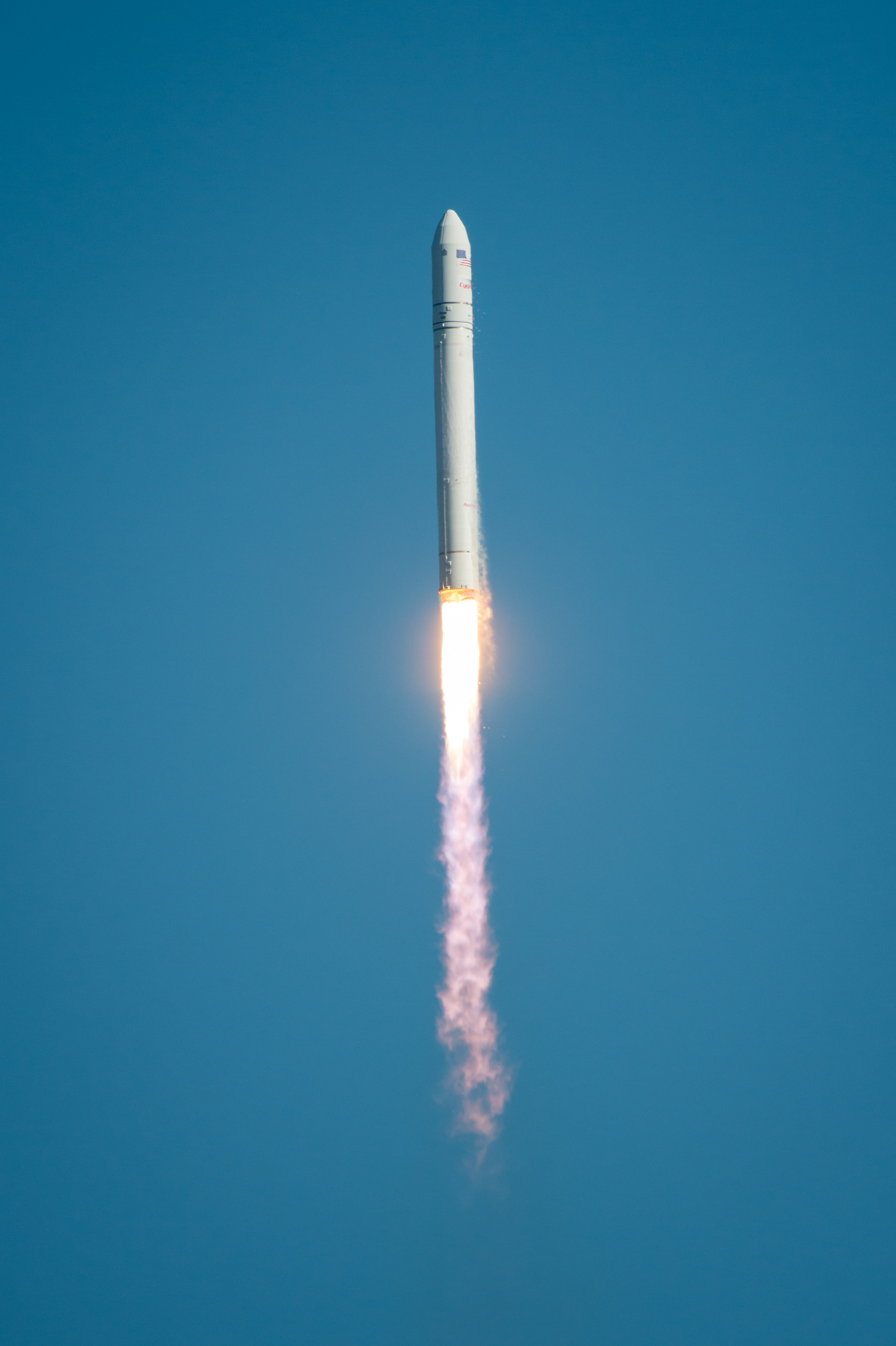
Antares in flight

== See also ==
- Dragon Spacecraft Qualification Unit
