= Nexus S =

2010 smartphone developed by Google and Samsung

Samsung Nexus S

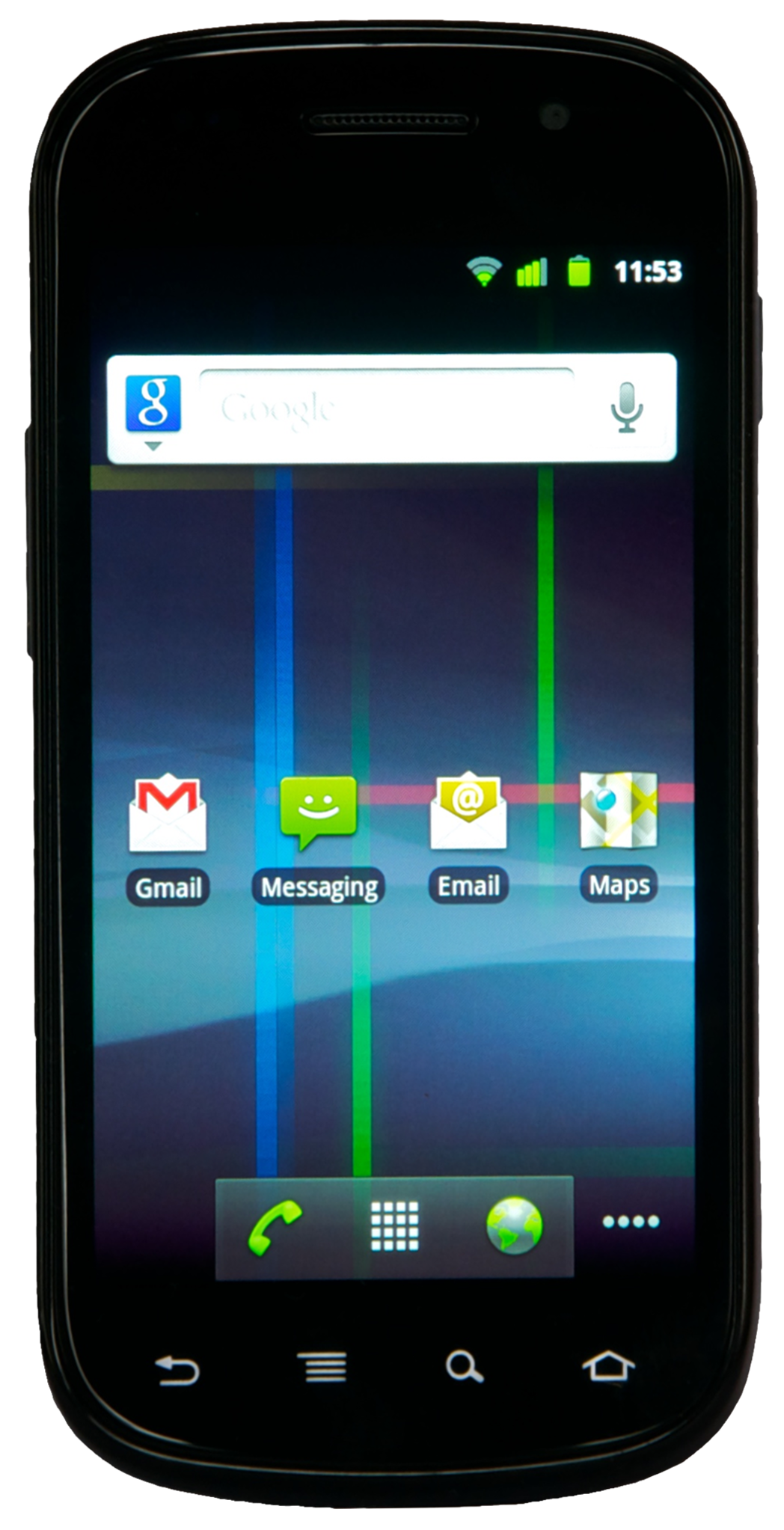
- Nexus S running Android 2.3 "Gingerbread"
- Brand: Google / Samsung
- Manufacturer: Samsung
- Type: Smartphone
- Series: Google Nexus
- First released: United States December 16, 2010; 15 years ago T-Mobile USA
- Availability by region: South Korea August 10, 2010; 16 years ago Korea Telecom UK December 22, 2010; 15 years ago (Vodafone & Unlocked); Canada April 7, 2011; 15 years ago Wind Mobile, Mobilicity, Telus, Koodo Mobile & Rogers Wireless; Serbia April 4, 2011; 15 years ago Thailand April 1, 2011; 15 years ago AIS
- Discontinued: May 24, 2012 (Sprint)
- Predecessor: Nexus One
- Successor: Galaxy Nexus
- Related: Samsung Galaxy S
- Compatible networks: GSM/GPRS/EDGE Quad-band (850, 900, 1800, and 1900 MHz); AWS WCDMA/HSPA Tri-band (900, 1700, and 2100 MHz) OR UMTS WCDMA/HSPA Tri-band (850, 1900, and 2100 MHz); HSDPA 7.2 Mbit/s; HSUPA 5.76 Mbit/s; CDMA2000 EV-DO Rev.A + Mobile WiMAX (Sprint Network)
- Form factor: Slate
- Dimensions: 123.9 mm (4.88 in) H 63.0 mm (2.48 in) W 10.8 mm (0.43 in) D
- Weight: 129.0 g (4.55 oz) (AMOLED-Version); 140.0 g (4.94 oz) (Super-Clear-LCD-Version)
- Operating system: Original: Android 2.3 "Gingerbread"; Last: Android 4.1.2 "Jelly Bean"
- System-on-chip: Samsung Exynos 3 Single
- CPU: 1 GHz single-core ARM Cortex-A8
- GPU: 200 MHz PowerVR SGX 540 GPU
- Memory: 512 MB RAM (split 128MB GPU / 384MB OS)
- Storage: 16 GB iNAND (partitioned 1 GB internal storage, 15 GB USB storage)
- Battery: 1,500 mAh internal user-replaceable rechargeable Li-ion
- Rear camera: 5 megapixel (2,560×1,920) auto focus LED flash
- Front camera: VGA (640×480)
- Display: 800×480 px (0.37 megapixels), 4.0 in (10 cm) diagonal (2.06×3.43 in), 233 ppi, WVGA Super AMOLED PenTile or Super Clear LCD (GT-i9023)
- Connectivity: 3.5 mm TRRS; A-GPS; Bluetooth 2.1 + EDR; Micro USB 2.0; NFC; Wi-Fi 802.11b/g/n
- Data inputs: 3-axis gyroscope Accelerometer; Ambient light sensor Capacitive touch-sensitive buttons Digital compass Microphone; Multi-touch capacitive touchscreen Proximity sensor Push buttons
- Codename: Crespo
- SAR: Head: 0.51 W/kg 1 g Body: 0.78 W/kg 1 g Hotspot: -
- Hearing aid compatibility: M4
- Other: Wi-Fi hotspot USB tethering Oleophobic display coating SIP VoIP

The Nexus S is a smartphone co-developed by Google and Samsung and manufactured by Samsung Electronics for release in 2010. It was the first smartphone to use the Android 2.3 "Gingerbread" operating system, and the first Android device to support Near Field Communication (NFC) in both hardware and software.

This was the fourth time that Google worked with a manufacturer to produce a phone, the previous being the Google G1, myTouch, and the Nexus One, all three by HTC. Following the Nexus S, the next Android Developer phone was the Galaxy Nexus, released the following year.

The Nexus S is the first commercial smartphone certified by NASA to fly on the space shuttle and to be used on the International Space Station, as part of the SPHERES experiment.

== History and availability ==
The Nexus S was demonstrated by Google CEO Eric Schmidt on November 15, 2010, at the Web 2.0 Summit. Google officially announced the phone on their blog on December 6, 2010. The phone became available for purchase on December 16 in the United States and on December 22 in the United Kingdom.

The Super AMOLED version of the phone is the GT-I9020 and it is based on the Samsung Galaxy S hardware, the principal hardware differences being the absence of support for an SD card and the addition of a near field chip. The alternate SC-LCD (Super Clear LCD) version of the phone is the GT-I9023 which is meant for the European (non-UK) market.

In May 2011 Sprint introduced its Nexus S in the US. Unlike the GSM version, the Sprint Nexus runs on its WiMAX network and uses CDMA instead of GSM.

Also in March 2011 Vodafone released a white version of the phone on its web store in the UK.

In the United Kingdom, the Nexus S was sold at Carphone Warehouse and was available on the Vodafone, O2, T-Mobile, 3, and Orange networks.

In France, it was available through SFR and Bouygues Telecom.

In India, Samsung officially announced the sale of the unlocked version with Super Clear LCD screen i9023, which will support all GSM-based carriers throughout the country.

In Canada, the Nexus S became available at most carriers in April 2011 in two versions, one for Telus, Bell, and Rogers with 3G frequencies of 850/1900/2100 MHz, and the other for Wind/Mobilicity/Vidéotron, using 3G frequencies 900/1700/2100.

In Australia, the Nexus S became available in both black and white. It was available on Vodafone and its virtual provider Crazy John's.

== Hardware ==
=== Processor ===
The Nexus S has the Samsung Exynos 3110 processor. This processor combines a 45 nm 1 GHz ARM Cortex A8 based CPU core with a PowerVR SGX 540 GPU. The CPU core, code-named "Hummingbird", was co-developed by Samsung and Intrinsity. The GPU, designed by Imagination Technologies, supports OpenGL ES 1.1/2.0 and is capable of up to 20 million triangles per second.

=== Memory ===
- The Nexus S has 512 MB of RAM (Mobile DDR) (128MB is assigned to the GPU, leaving 384MB free for the OS),
- 16 GB of NAND memory, partitioned as 1 GB internal storage and 15 GB "USB storage".
- The phone does not support additional storage capacity such as microSD.

=== Screen ===
The Nexus S is the first device to use a 4.0-inch (100 mm) slightly curved glass touchscreen, described by Google as a "Contour Display", with a Super AMOLED 800 x 480 WVGA PenTile matrix display manufactured by Samsung. In markets outside Canada, the US, and the UK, a Super LCD is supplied instead.

== Software ==
The phone shipped with Android 2.3 (Gingerbread) and was the first device to ship with the updated OS. On December 19, 2011, Google released Android 4.0 (Ice Cream Sandwich) for the Nexus S. The automatic update was suspended, allegedly due to poor battery performance. The UMTS/GSM variants was among the first to receive Android 4.0.4 in March 2012. The Nexus S 4G (aka Samsung SPH-D720), I9020A, and M200, while taking longer than the GSM variant, received the Android 4.0.4 update. Several devices, such as the Samsung Galaxy S II, have or will receive updates before these variants.

On June 27, 2012, at the Google I/O conference, it was announced that the Nexus S would be one of the first devices to receive an upgrade to Android 4.1 (Jelly Bean), along with the Motorola Xoom and Galaxy Nexus, began on July 26, 2012.

In October 2012, the Jelly Bean 4.1.2 OTA update was released, and it is the last official OS released for these devices.

On November 13, 2012, it was announced that the Nexus S would not be updated to Android 4.2 (Jelly Bean).

Using third-party ROMs, Android 4.2.2-, 4.3-, 4.4-, 5.1-, and 6.0-based software can be installed. postmarketOS can also be installed, but is unstable.

== Variants ==
See

Model number	Notable differences
GT-I9020 or GT-I9020T	900 / 1700 / 2100 MHz UMTS, Super AMOLED
GT-I9020A	850 / 1900 / 2100 MHz UMTS, Super AMOLED
GT-I9023	900 / 1700 / 2100 MHz UMTS, Super Clear LCD
SPH-D720	CDMA2000, 4G WiMAX, Super AMOLED
SHW-M200S/M200K	900 / 1700 / 2100 MHz UMTS, Super AMOLED

== Unlocked ==
The Nexus S cannot be SIM-locked and has an unlockable bootloader, allowing users to install custom ROMs.

== Critical reception ==
Joshua Topolsky, writing for Engadget review praised the device's hardware and software, concluding "the truth is, it really is the best Android device available right now".

The review by The Register gave the Nexus S an 85% rating and summarized it as a "cool, innovative device to snatch Apple’s smartphone crown."

An AnandTech review praised the display, NFC tag reader, and Android Gingerbread operating system, but noted the lack of 720p video recording, HSPA+ baseband, and external storage support. A TechRadar review praised the Nexus S for fixing the GPS problems experienced with the Samsung Galaxy S: "The good news for those looking to upgrade from the Samsung Galaxy S – the GPS issues have been resolved, in that you can actually now get a signal with no problem."

CNET's review was enthusiastic about the display, operating system, and performance. CNET noted the lack of 720p video recording, HDMI output and external (SD card) memory support. CNET also noted the "rather fragile" feel of the phone, the lack of LED notifications, and the few new features over the Nexus One.

== See also ==
- Comparison of Google Nexus smartphones
- Alexander (satellite)
- ARMv7
- ARM Cortex A9
