= Android Ice Cream Sandwich =

2011 Android mobile operating system

- Version of the Android operating system
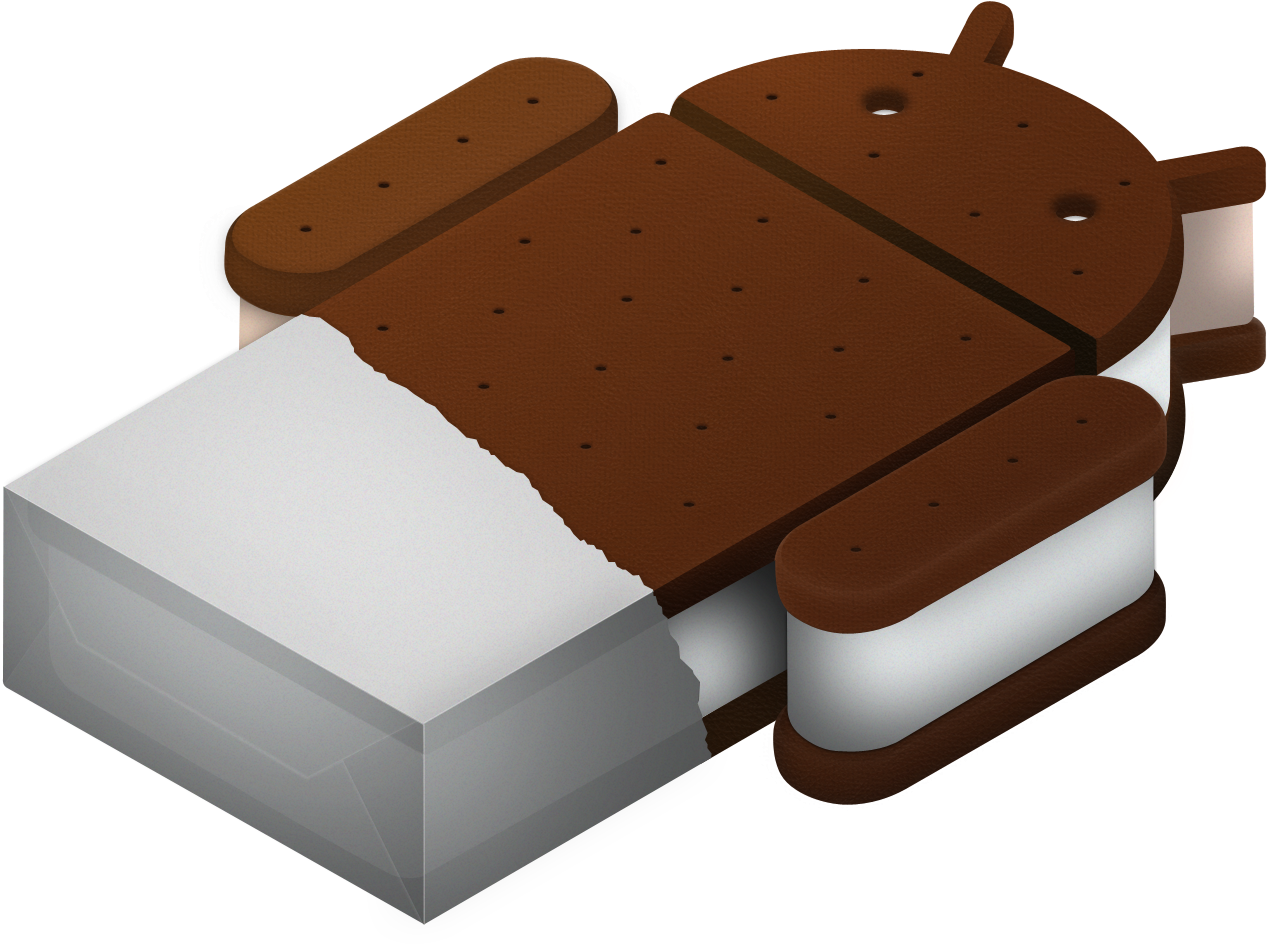

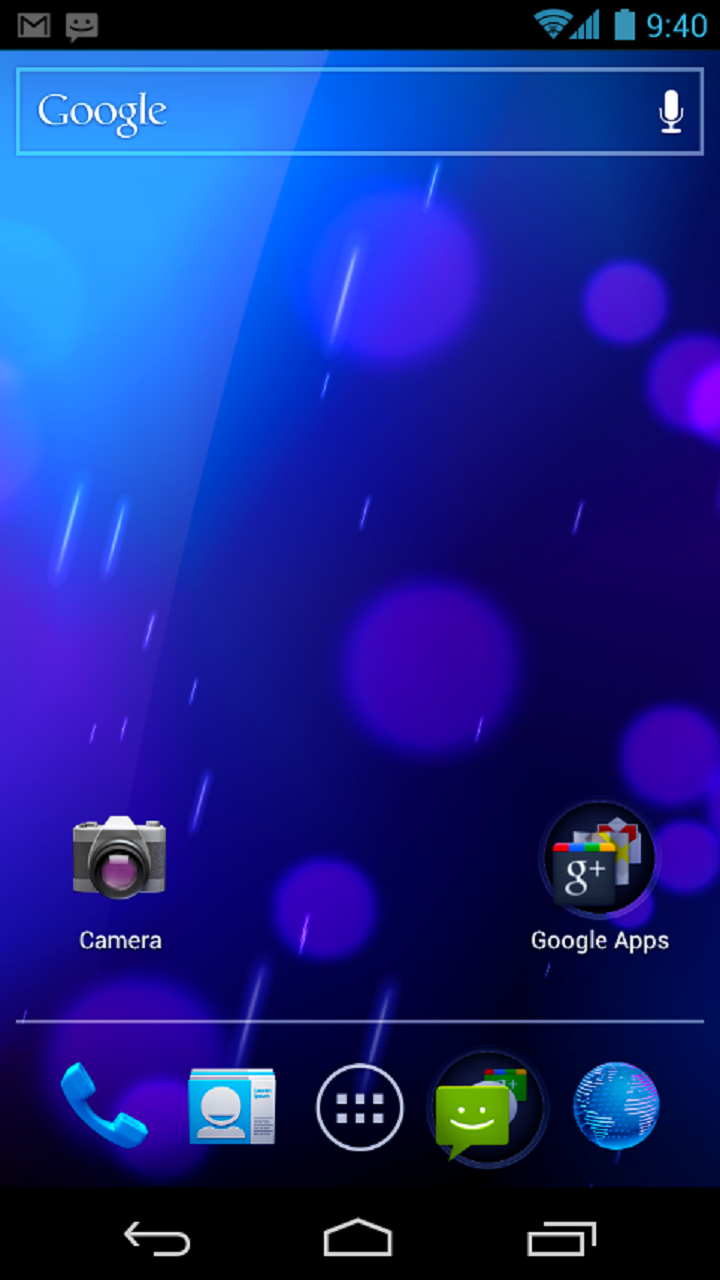
- Android 4.0 home screen on a Galaxy Nexus
- Developer: Google
- Working state: No longer supported
- Released to manufacturing: October 19, 2011; 15 years ago
- Final release: 4.0.4_r2.1 (IMM76L) / June 6, 2012; 14 years ago
- Kernel type: Monolithic (Linux)
- Preceded by: Android Gingerbread (2.3) (smartphones); Android Honeycomb (3.0) (tablets)
- Succeeded by: Android Jelly Bean (4.1)
- Official website: developer.android.com/about/versions/android-4.0-highlights.html

Support status
- Unsupported as of November 4, 2014; Google Play Services support dropped since February 2019; Google Account support dropped

Android Ice Cream Sandwich (version 4.0) is the fourth major version of the Android mobile operating system developed by Google. Unveiled on October 19, 2011, Ice Cream Sandwich built upon the significant changes made by the tablet-only release Android Honeycomb, in an effort to create a unified platform for both smartphones and tablet computers. The first phone to ship with Android Ice Cream Sandwich was the Galaxy Nexus.

Android 4.0 focused on simplifying and modernizing the Android experience through a new set of human interface guidelines. As part of these efforts, it introduced a new visual appearance codenamed "Holo", which was built around a cleaner, minimalist design, and a new default typeface named Roboto. It also introduced several other new features, including a refreshed home screen, near-field communication (NFC) support and the ability to "beam" content to another user using the technology, an updated web browser, a new contacts manager with social network integration, the ability to access the camera and control music playback from the lock screen, visual voicemail support, face recognition for device unlocking ("Face Unlock"), the ability to monitor and limit mobile data usage, and other internal improvements.

Android 4.0 received positive reviews from critics, who praised its cleaner, revamped appearance compared to previous versions, as well as improved performance and functionality. However, critics still felt that some of Android 4.0's stock apps lacked quality and functionality compared to third-party alternatives. They regarded some of the operating system's new features, particularly the "face unlock" feature, as gimmicks.

As of January 2025, only 0.01% of all Android devices run Android Ice Cream Sandwich.

== Development ==
Following the tablet-only release "Android Honeycomb", it was announced at Google I/O 2011 that the next version of Android, code-named "Ice Cream Sandwich" (ICS), would emphasize providing a unified user experience between both smartphones and tablets. In June 2011, details also began to surface surrounding a then-new Nexus phone by Samsung to accompany ICS, which would notably exclude hardware navigation keys. Android blog RootzWiki released photos in August 2011 showing a Nexus S running a build of ICS, depicting a new application menu layout resembling that of Honeycomb, and a new interface with blue-colored accenting. An official launch event for Android 4.0 and the new Nexus phone was originally scheduled for October 11, 2011, at a CTIA trade show in San Diego. However, out of respect for the death of Apple co-founder Steve Jobs, Google and Samsung postponed the event to October 19, 2011, in Hong Kong. Android 4.0 and its launch device, the Samsung Galaxy Nexus, were officially unveiled on October 19, 2011. Andy Rubin explained that 4.0 was intended to provide an "enticing and intuitive" user experience across both smartphones and tablets.

Matias Duarte, Google's vice president of design, explained that development of Ice Cream Sandwich was based around the question "What is the soul of the new machine?". User studies concluded that the existing Android interface was too complicated, thereby preventing users from being "empowered" by their devices. The overall visual appearance of Android was streamlined for Ice Cream Sandwich, building upon the changes made on the tablet-oriented Android 3.0, his first project at Google; Duarte admitted that his team had cut back support for smaller screens on Honeycomb to prioritize sufficient tablet support, as he wanted Android OEMs to "stop doing silly things like taking a phone UI and stretching it out to a 10-inch tablet." Judging Android's major competitors, Duarte felt that the interface of iOS was too skeuomorphic and kitschy, Windows Phone's Metro design language looked too much like "airport lavatory signage", and that both operating systems tried too hard to enforce conformity, "[without] leaving any room for the content to express itself." For Ice Cream Sandwich, his team aimed to provide interface design guidelines that would evoke a modern appearance, while still allowing flexibility for application developers. He characterized the revised look of Ice Cream Sandwich as having "toned down the geeky nerd quotient" in comparison to Honeycomb, which carried a more futuristic appearance that was compared by critics to the aesthetics of Tron.

In January 2012, following the official launch of Ice Cream Sandwich, Duarte and Google launched an Android Design portal, which featured human interface guidelines, best practices, and other resources for developers building Android applications designed for Ice Cream Sandwich.

The initiatives by Duarte evolved into a unified design language, for subsequent Android versions across different device types, called Material Design, starting with Android Lollipop, version 5.0.

== Release ==
The Galaxy Nexus was the first Android device to ship with Android 4.0. Android 4.0.3 was released on December 16, 2011, providing bug fixes, a new social stream API, and other internal improvements. The same day, Google began a rollout of Ice Cream Sandwich to the predecessor of the Galaxy Nexus, the Nexus S. However, on December 20, 2011, the Nexus S rollout was "paused" so the company could "monitor feedback" related to the update.

On Mar 29, 2012, Android 4.0.4 was released, adding several performance improvements to the camera and screen rotation, as well as other bug fixes.

Google Play Services support for Android 4.0 ended in February 2019.

== Features ==
=== Visual design ===
The user interface of Android 4.0 represented an evolution of the design introduced by Honeycomb. However, the futuristic aesthetics of Honeycomb were scaled back in favor of flat design with neon blue accenting, hard edges, and drop shadows for depth. Ice Cream Sandwich also introduced a new default system font, Roboto; designed in-house to replace the Droid font family, Roboto was primarily optimized for use on high-resolution mobile displays. The new visual appearance of Ice Cream Sandwich was implemented by a widget toolkit known as "Holo"; to ensure access to the Holo style across all devices—even if they use a customized interface skin elsewhere, all Android devices certified to ship with Google Play Store (formerly Android Market) must provide the capability for apps to use the unmodified Holo theme.

As with Honeycomb, devices could now render navigation buttons—"Back", "Home", and "Recent apps"—on a "system bar" across the bottom of the screen, removing the need for physical equivalents. The "Menu" button that was present on previous generations of Android devices was deprecated, in favor of presenting buttons for actions within apps on "action bars", and menu items which did not fit on the bar in "action overflow" menus, designated by three vertical dots. Hardware "Search" buttons were also deprecated in favor of search buttons within action bars. On devices without a "Menu" key, a temporary "Menu" key would now be displayed on-screen while running apps that were not coded to support the new navigation scheme. On devices with a hardware "Menu" key, action overflow buttons were hidden in apps and mapped to the "Menu" key.

=== User experience ===
The default home screen of Ice Cream Sandwich displayed a persistent Google Search bar across the top, a dock across the bottom containing the app drawer button in the middle, and four slots for app shortcuts alongside it. Folders of apps could now be made by dragging an app and hovering it over another. The app drawer was split into two tabs: one for apps and the other for widgets to be placed on home screen pages. Widgets themselves could now be resized and contain scrolling content. Android 4.0 contained an increased use of swiping gestures; apps and notifications could now be removed from the recent apps menu and dismissed from the notifications area by sliding them away, and several stock and Google apps now used a new form of tabs, in which users could navigate between different panes by either tapping their name on a strip, or by swiping left and right.

The phone app was updated with a Holo design, the ability to send pre-configured text message responses to incoming calls, and visual voicemail integration in the call log display. The web browser app incorporated updated versions of WebKit and V8, supporting syncing with Google Chrome, an override mode for loading a desktop-oriented version of a website rather than a mobile-oriented version, as well as offline browsing. The "Contacts" section of the phone app was split off into a new "People" app, which offered integration with social networks such as Google+ to display recent posts and synchronize contacts, and a "Me" profile for the device's user. The camera app was redesigned, with reduced shutter lag, face detection, a new panorama mode, and the ability to take still photos while recording video in camcorder mode. The photo gallery app added basic photo editing tools. The lock screen supported "Face Unlock", included a shortcut for launching the camera app, and housed playback controls for music players. The keyboard incorporated improved autocomplete algorithms, and improvements to voice input allowing for continuous dictation. The ability to take screenshots by holding down the power and "Volume down" buttons together was also added.

On devices supporting near-field communication (NFC), "Android Beam" allowed users to share links to content from compatible apps by holding the back of their device up against the back of another NFC-equipped Android device, and tapping the screen when prompted. Certain "System" apps (particularly those pre-loaded by carriers) that could not be uninstalled could instead be turned off. This would hide the application and prevent it from launching, but the application was not removed from storage. Android 4.0 introduced features for managing data usage over mobile networks; users could now display the total amount of data they have used over a period of time, and display data usage per app. Background data usage can now be turned off globally or per app, and a cap can automatically turn off data if usage reaches a quota set by the device.

=== Platform ===
Android 4.0 inherited platform additions from Honeycomb, and also added support for ambient temperature and humidity sensors, Bluetooth Health Device Profile, near-field communication (NFC), and Wi-Fi Direct. The operating system also provided improved support for stylus and mouse input, along with new accessibility, calendar, keychain, spell checking, social networking, and virtual private network APIs. For multimedia support, Android 4.0 also added support for ADTS AAC, Matroska containers for Vorbis and VP8, WebP, streaming of VP8, OpenMAX AL, and HTTP Live Streaming 3.0.

== Reception ==
Android 4.0 was released to a positive reception: Ars Technica praised the Holo user interface for having a "sense of identity and visual coherence that were previously lacking" in comparison to previous versions of Android, also believing that the new interface style could help improve the quality of third-party apps. The stock apps of Android 4.0 were also praised for having slightly better functionality in comparison to previous versions. Other features were noted, such as improvements to text and voice input, data usage controls (especially given the increasing use of metered data plans), and overall performance improvements compared to Gingerbread. However, the Face Unlock feature was panned for being an insecure gimmick, and although providing an improved experience over the previous version, some of its stock applications (such as its email client) were panned for still being inferior to third-party alternatives.

Engadget also acknowledged the maturing quality of the Android experience on Ice Cream Sandwich, and praised the modern feel of its new interface in comparison to Android 2.3, along with some of the new features provided by Google's stock apps and the operating system itself. In conclusion, Engadget felt that Android 4.0 was "a gorgeous OS that offers great performance and—for the most part—doesn't feel like a half-baked effort." However, Engadget still felt that some of Android 4.0's new features (such as Face Unlock) had a "beta feel" to them, noted the lack of Facebook integration with the new People app, and that the operating system was still not as intuitive for new users as its competitors.

PC Magazine acknowledged influence from Windows Phone 7 in the new "People" app and improved benchmark performance on the web browser, but considered both Android Beam and Face Unlock to be gimmicks, and criticized the lack of support for certain apps and Adobe Flash on launch.

== See also ==
- Android version history
- iOS 5
- OS X Lion
- Windows Phone 7
- Windows 7
