= Innovative Solutions In Space =

ISISPACE Group (Innovative Solutions In Space)
- Type: Engineering
- Industry: Aerospace manufacturer
- Founded: January 6, 2006; 20 years ago
- Fate: Active
- Headquarters: Delft, Netherlands
- Key people: Jeroen Rotteveel (CEO)
- Products: Small satellite manufacture, launch and operation
- Number of employees: 120
- Website: www.isispace.nl

ISISPACE (Innovative Solutions In Space) is a Dutch NewSpace company based in Delft dedicated to the design, manufacture and operation of CubeSats.

The company is one of the market leaders in Europe on the nano-satellite domain. ISISPACE has supported the launch of 367 satellites on multiple launch vehicles as of October 2019. Some of the launch vehicles that have launched payloads for ISISPACE in the past or are scheduled to launch payloads in the future are the PSLV, Vega and Electron rockets. Out of the 104 satellites on the ISRO's record breaking PSLV-C37 mission, 101 were provided by ISISPACE. Through Innovative Space Logistics (ISL), its launch services subsidiary, ISISPACE also facilitates the launches of small satellites by contracting piggyback launch opportunities to low Earth orbit on a variety of different launch vehicles. The company focuses on a CubeSat bus design in the range of 1 to 30 kg.

== History ==
ISISPACE was founded in January 2006 as a spin-off from the Delfi-C3 nanosatellite project from Delft University of Technology.

In 2017 ISISPACE was developing a satellite for the Royal Netherlands Air Force, the Brik-II.

== See also ==
- Commercialization of space
- List of private spaceflight companies
- Space industry
