= Nexus One =

2010 Android smartphone by HTC

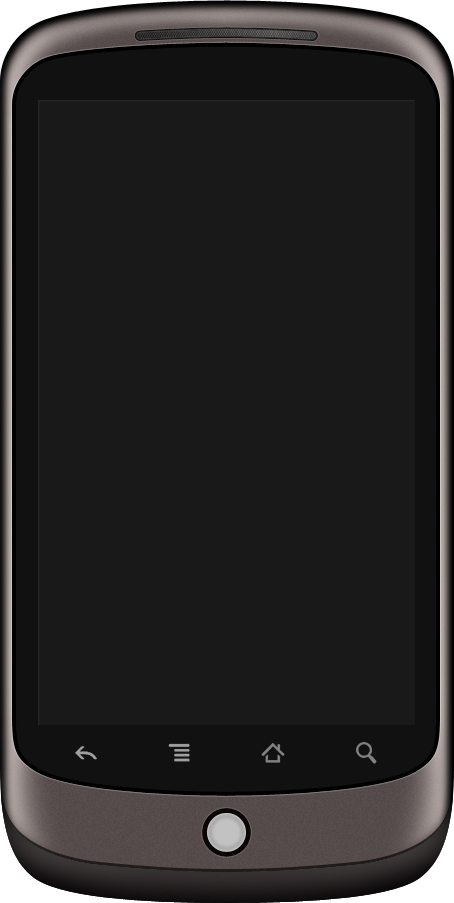
- Front view of the Nexus One
- Developer: Google and HTC
- Manufacturer: HTC
- Series: Google Nexus
- First released: January 5, 2010; 16 years ago [US, UK, Hong Kong]
- Availability by region: Canada March 16, 2010; Singapore April 30, 2010; Germany May 25, 2010; Italy May 28, 2010; South Korea July 10, 2010
- Discontinued: July 18, 2010; 16 years ago
- Predecessor: HTC Dream
- Successor: Nexus S
- Related: HTC Desire
- Compatible networks: GSM/EDGE 850/900/1800/1900 MHz; UMTS 850/1900/2100 MHz or UMTS 900/1700/2100 MHz; HSDPA 7.2 Mbit/s; HSUPA 2 Mbit/s; GPRS Class 10
- Form factor: Slate
- Dimensions: 119 mm (4.7 in) H 59.8 mm (2.35 in) W 11.5 mm (0.45 in) D
- Weight: 130 g (4.6 oz) [with battery] 100 g (3.5 oz) [without battery]
- Operating system: Original: Android 2.1 "Eclair"; Last: Android 2.3.6 "Gingerbread"; Unofficial: Android 3.0 "Honeycomb"
- System-on-chip: Qualcomm Snapdragon QSD8250 (Snapdragon S1)
- CPU: Single-core 1 GHz Qualcomm Scorpion
- GPU: Qualcomm Adreno 200 @ 128 MHz
- Memory: 512 MB
- Storage: 512 MB (190 MB application storage)
- Removable storage: microSDHC 4 GB Included (supports up to 32 GB)
- Battery: 1400 mAh Rechargeable Li-ion (User replaceable)
- Rear camera: 5.0-megapixel with 2X digital zoom, 2592×1944 max. Autofocus; LED flash 720×480 video at 20 FPS or higher
- Display: At launch: AMOLED; Later: Super LCD; 3.7 in (94 mm) diagonal PenTile; 480×800 px 254 ppi (0.38 Megapixels); 3:5 aspect ratio WVGA; 24-bit color 100,000:1 contrast ratio 1 ms response rate
- Connectivity: 3.5 mm TRRS; Bluetooth v2.1 + EDR with A2DP micro USB 2.0; Wi-Fi IEEE 802.11b/g/n
- Data inputs: Multi-touch capacitive touchscreen 3-axis accelerometer A-GPS; Ambient light sensor Digital compass Proximity sensor Push buttons Trackball
- Codename: Passion
- SAR: Head: 0.973 W/kg 1 g Body: 1.1 W/kg 1 g Hotspot: -

The Nexus One (codenamed HTC Passion) is an Android-based smartphone designed and manufactured by HTC as Google's first Nexus smartphone. The Nexus became available on January 5, 2010, and features the ability to transcribe voice to text, an additional microphone for dynamic noise suppression, and voice-guided turn-by-turn navigation to drivers.

The device was sold SIM-unlocked and not restricted to use on a single network provider. Google offered T-Mobile US and AT&T versions of the phone online in the United States before closing the online store in July 2010. A version for use on Vodafone (European) networks was announced on April 26, 2010, available in the United Kingdom four days later. On March 16, 2010, the Nexus One became available on the Google web store (Play Store) for sale in Canada for use with most Canadian carriers. In May 2010, Google announced the closing of the web store, with the intention to distribute the phone through partners around the world.

== History ==
A trademark application for the name "Nexus One" was filed by Google Inc. on December 10, 2009. The Nexus One trademark was filed in International Trademark Class 9 for "Computer & Software Products & Electrical & Scientific Products" with description of "Mobile phones". On March 15, 2010, it was announced that the application had been declined due to the mark already being granted on December 30, 2008, to Integra Telecom.

On December 12, 2009, Google confirmed in a blog post that it had begun internal testing of the device. Google stated that a "mobile lab device" had been given to its employees, at that time Google had not yet confirmed that a device would be sold to consumers. Wireless phone and data services for the device were not activated or billed to Google; it was up to the employees to activate and pay for wireless service on their own.

As of April 2010, the Nexus One had shipped to the US, the UK, Hong Kong, Germany and Singapore, although the phone was not fully localized for non-US markets – the lack of satnav outside the US, UK and Ireland, and the US English "voice keyboard" being the most obvious shortcomings. A June 2010 update enabled Google Navigation for an additional 11 countries.

=== Litigation ===
Upon the announcement of the Nexus One, Google received a cease-and-desist complaint by the estate of sci-fi author Philip K. Dick implying that the Nexus One namesake capitalized on intellectual property from his 1968 novel Do Androids Dream of Electric Sheep?. Isa Dick Hackett, daughter of Philip K. Dick, and several bloggers believed that the choice of name "Nexus One" as Google's first Android phone was a direct reference to the "Nexus-6" model series of androids in Dick's novel.

Google released Nexus One on 5 January 2010, shortly after Eric Schmidt leaved Apple's board of directors. Apple targeted the Nexus One in a patent lawsuit against HTC, which was settled in December 2012.

The Nexus One' reportedly had problems with 3G connectivity and touchscreen at launch. Updates were issued for the operating system, including the addition of multi-touch abilities in the Android web browser and Google Maps functions. While the updates reportedly also somewhat improved 3G connectivity for the T-Mobile USA version of the device, similar issues with the AT&T-compatible version have not yet been addressed. A class action lawsuit was filed against Google on the matter, as the phone had problems connecting to 3G networks in areas with less-than-ideal coverage.

== Features ==
=== Hardware ===
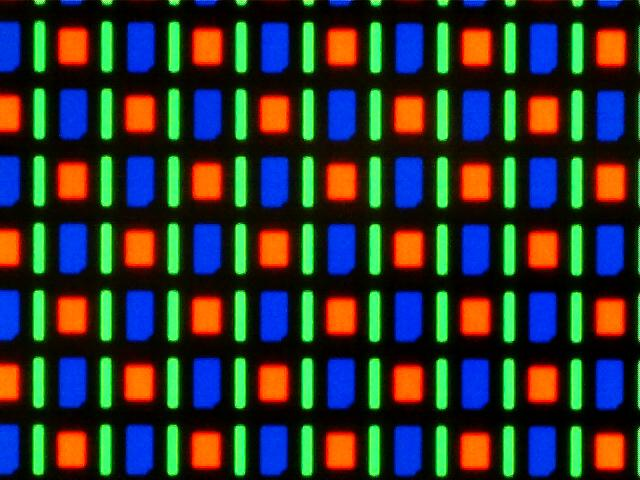
PenTile matrix pixel arrangement of the AMOLED screen

At the time of launch, the Nexus One had a 3.7 inch AMOLED screen with PenTile matrix pixel arrangement. The raster resolution is 480×800 pixels; however, each pixel in the PenTile RGBG display is represented by only two subpixels on average, using subpixel rendering rather than the three found in most displays, meeting the definition of WVGA according to the Video Electronics Standards Association specifications for measuring resolution.

Citing supply shortages of AMOLED displays, HTC announced on July 26, 2010, that the Nexus One would begin using Super LCD technology instead of AMOLED. The Super LCD was described as having greater power efficiency and color accuracy than the AMOLED display, while sacrificing the lauded color saturation and deep blacks of the original display. As of January 15, 2011, or earlier, all Nexus One's available via Brightstar, Google's worldwide distribution partner for Android development phones, shipped with Super LCD instead of AMOLED. (Note: To determine whether a phone has the AMOLED or SLCD display, power on while holding the volume down key or pressing the trackball and examine the MICROP line; 0b15 indicates AMOLED while 0c15 indicates SLCD. The internal sticker on the back side of the screen assembly can also be examined; part number 60H00443-03P indicates SLCD and part number 60H00287-00P indicates AMOLED. Finally, USB debugging or a terminal emulator app can also be used to examine the kernel log to determine which display the phone has.)

The capacitive touchscreen which uses the Synaptics ClearPad 2000 sensor supports multi-touch gestures limited to single finger input and 2×1D two finger gestures. It has an illuminated trackball which can emit different colors of light based on the type of notification being received. A voice processor developed by Audience uses a second microphone (on the back) to suppress background noise during phone conversations. A 4-conductor TRRS style 3.5mm stereo headset jack is also provided, adding microphone and pause/resume/next/previous functions to the stereo earphones.

The phone features a 5.0-megapixel auto-focus camera with LED flash and digital zoom, GPS receiver, Bluetooth 2.0, and 802.11b/g Wi-Fi abilities. The Snapdragon processor allows for many advanced abilities including 720p video playback. There is built in hardware decoding for H.263, H.264 and MPEG-4 video, and can play MP3, AAC+, Ogg Vorbis, WAV, and MIDI audio, and display JPEG, GIF, PNG, and BMP image formats. It has a micro USB port which conforms to the GSMA Universal Charging Solution instead of the common mini-USB port, or HTC's mini-USB compatible format (ExtUSB). The microSD card slot allows expansion up to 32 gigabytes of card storage. Applications can be installed either to the 512 MB internal flash memory, of which 190 MB are available for that purpose, or to the microSD card. Many applications, however, are not optimized for installation on external memory, and high data I/O throughput to the microSD may cause applications running off external memory to freeze.

=== Network frequencies ===
As of March 16, 2010, there are two versions of the Nexus One, which differ in the 3G frequencies they support. The GSM frequencies supported by both models are 850 MHz, 900 MHz, 1800 MHz and 1900 MHz. Additionally, the original Nexus One (PB99100) also included UMTS frequency bands 1 (2100 MHz), 4 (1700 MHz), and 8 (900 MHz). The second version of the Nexus One (PB99110) supports UMTS frequency bands 1 (2100 MHz), 2 (1900 MHz), and 5 (850 MHz).

The UMTS radio supports High Speed Packet Access, HSDPA at 7.2 Mbit/s, and HSUPA at 2 Mbit/s.

=== Software ===
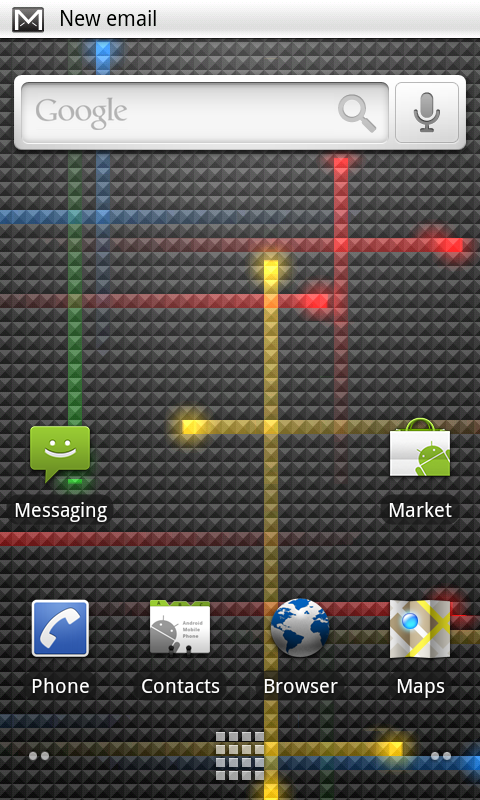
The Nexus One home screen displaying Android 2.1 Eclair

The Nexus One was released with Android 2.1 Eclair. The integrated Media Gallery, developed by Cooliris, provides several new features allowing the user to browse, edit, and share photos and videos on the phone.

Later, an OTA update of Android 2.2 Froyo was released, which introduced several highlights: a new Home screen, support for Adobe Flash 10.1, better Microsoft Exchange support, Wi-Fi tethering, SD-card installable applications, cloud to device messaging for two-way push sync functionality and an overall 2-5x performance improvement.

The Android 2.2 update caused the Nexus One to develop a serious Wi-Fi connectivity issue which causes the Wi-Fi to continually lose its connection and fail to reconnect. There are reports that Android 2.2.1 had fixed this issue, although there has been no official word from Google.

As of January 28, 2011, Android-based phones have access to more than 210,000 applications through Google Play.

The Nexus One OTA update to Gingerbread (2.3.3) started on February 23, 2011.

The Nexus One currently runs the Google Android 2.3.6, Gingerbread, operating system.

Google has stated it will not update the Nexus One to Android 4.0, Ice Cream Sandwich saying the hardware is "too old"; however, third party ROMs were made.

== Platform development and modification ==
The Nexus One ships with an unlockable bootloader allowing developers to participate in the Android Open Source Project in addition to developing applications. The Nexus One bootloader can be unlocked and various partitions on the device can be flashed with the fastboot utility which is part of the Android Open Source Project. Fastboot runs on Linux, Mac OS, or Windows and accesses the Nexus One through the USB port.

The bootloader of the Nexus One is accessed by holding volume down while powering up the device.

Users are able to gain root privileges on the device by first unlocking its bootloader using the fastboot command fastboot oem unlock and flashing a package that adds the functionality to the system or by uploading specially crafted data packages via the adb program without the need to unlock the bootloader. Unlocking the bootloader or rooting the device allows the user to install non-official firmware images. Additionally, obtaining root privileges enables a user to override protected operating system features, and install arbitrary software. If the fastboot command is used to unlock the bootloader, the user is presented with a Google-created screen stating that unlocking the bootloader will void the warranty as well as void any insurance plan, which the user is required to accept.

A NASA project, PhoneSat, which builds nanosatellites using unmodified consumer-grade off-the-shelf smartphones, used a Nexus One smartphone running Android 2.3.3 as the onboard computer in their PhoneSat 1.0 version.

== Comparison with other phones ==
Though the multi-touch experience of the Nexus One is generally similar to that of other multi-touch enabled smartphones (e.g., iPhone, Palm Pre, etc), the Nexus One hardware uses software to "enable" multi-touch ability, resulting in x/y axis confusion and preventing some multi-touch applications (e.g., games) from working as they should, compared to other phones. As of an update released February 2, 2010 it has pinch-to-zoom functionality in the phone's Browser, Gallery and Maps applications. In addition to these official applications, 3rd party apps that support multi-touch gestures are available.

=== HTC Desire ===
HTC later released the HTC Desire, which has very similar specifications to the Nexus One. The Desire features an optical trackpad rather than a trackball, physical buttons rather than the touch-sensitive buttons, and an FM radio but lacks the noise-cancelling dual microphones present in the Nexus One. The Desire is solely branded as HTC and runs HTC Sense rather than the stock version of Android. Sense can be switched off to get the stock Android experience however this was disabled on the retail HTC Desire.

== Reception ==
It was praised for its display, processor, and design. However, commentators believed that the phone didn't have enough unique features to gain an advantage against competitors. David Pogue of The New York Times praised the Nexus One for its "gleaming, attractive features; it's hard to choose which is more gratifying: the speed — instant, smooth response when you're opening programs and scrolling – or the huge, 3.7-inch touch screen, which has much finer resolution than the iPhone," however criticized its dictation, multitouch screen gestures, and animated wallpapers. Joshua Topolsky of Engadget believed that although the Nexus One was a good smartphone, it is "at its core just another Android smartphone. It's a particularly good one, don't get us wrong – certainly up there with the best of its breed -- but it's not in any way the Earth-shattering, paradigm-skewing device the media and community cheerleaders have built it up to be. It's a good Android phone, but not the last word – in fact, if we had to choose between this phone or the Droid right now, we would lean towards the latter". Kent German of CNET praised the Nexus One's display, processor, and voice functions, however criticized the media player and the requirement to store applications on the phone's internal storage.

Goldman Sachs slashed their estimates for sales of the phone in 2010 by 70% due to the half-hearted marketing efforts by carriers.

== Support ==
Initially, Google did not provide telephone support and consumers were forced to use its online Android forum. At this time, Google has stopped all support for the phone and customers are directed to contact HTC.

On July 16, 2010, Google announced that the next shipment of Nexus One smartphones would be the last to be sold on their web store, stating "While the global adoption of the Android platform has exceeded our expectations, the web store has not. It's remained a niche channel for early adopters, but it's clear that many customers like a hands-on experience before buying a phone." The device continued to be sold through retail stores, and other channel partners as of 2010.

As of November 1, 2010, Google has closed the Nexus One support forums, redirecting users to the Google Mobile forum, which only has categories for software. The message shown to users was: "The Nexus One forum will be archived and become read-only on November 1st. Please see the Nexus One Terms of Sale for details regarding support. If you have questions about using applications on your Nexus One post them to the Google Mobile Forum."

As of the 2011 announcement of Android 4.0, Ice Cream Sandwich, HTC has announced that there will be no more software updates for the Nexus One, as the hardware is now too old to run the new version of Android effectively.

== See also ==
- HTC Desire
- Google Nexus
