= List of Pocket PC devices =

This is a list of Pocket PC devices, and companies that make, or have made, them.

== Ocean PDA ==
- K1
- K2
- Designer
- PocketPaq
- K2 Sport
- K3

Ocean's Pocket PC devices are focused on kid entertainment. Ocean's K Line moved to Windows Mobile for Ocean PDA Limited (now a Public Limited Company) to focus on the smartphone business instead.

== Acer ==
=== Acer F Series ===
- F900

=== Acer C500 Series (integrated GPS) ===
- c510
- c530
- c531
- Ferrari Racing

=== Acer N Series ===
- n10
- n30
- n50
- n35 (integrated GPS)
- n300
- n310
- n311
- n320

== ASUS ==
- MyPal A600
- MyPal A620
- MyPal A620BT
- MyPal A626
- MyPal A632
- MyPal A636
- MyPal A636N
- MyPal A632N
- MyPal A639
- MyPal A686
- MyPal A696
- MyPal A716
- MyPal A730
- MyPal A730W
- P505
- P525
- P535
- P735
- P565

== Audiovox (now UTStarcom) ==
- Thera - Pocket PC with built-in CDMA Verizon cellphone
- PPC-6600/6601 - HTC Harrier (CDMA)
- PPC-6700 - HTC Apache (CDMA)
- PPC4100 - GSM/GPRS Pocket PC phone
- PPC-6800 - HTC Mogul (CDMA)
- PPC-6900 - HTC Touch (CDMA)

== Binatone ==
=== Binatone Carrera (GPS) ===
- X350
- X430

== Casio ==
=== Cassiopeia ===
Only the Casio E-115, E-125 and EM-500 were Pocket PCs. All others were using the older "Palm-sized PC" operating system except for the BE-300, which ran a stripped-down version of Windows CE 3.0 and would not run any Pocket PC software and many applications written for Windows CE itself.

- BE-300
- E-100
- E-115
- E-125
- EM-500
- A-22T
- A-10
- A-11

== Compaq ==
- C-Series
- iPAQ

== Cowon ==
- Cowon Q5W

== E-TEN ==
- M600
- G500
- X500 glofiish
- M700 glofiish
- T500
- X800 glofiish

== Dell ==
=== Dell Axim ===
- Axim X30
- Axim X5
- Axim X50
- Axim X50v
- Axim X51
- Axim X51v

== Dopod ==
Dopod site

- Dopod C500
- Dopod C730
- Dopod HTC Touch
- Dopod D600
- Dopod M700
- Dopod C720
- Dopod 838 Pro
- Dopod 818Pro
- Dopod C800
- Dopod P800W
- Dopod D810
- Dopod U1000
- Dopod 595
- Dopod 300

== Fisher Scientific ==
- Accumet XL60 pH/mV/DO/ISE/Conductivity/Resistivity/Temperature Meter
- Accumet XL50 pH/mV/ISE/Conductivity/Resistivity/Temperature Meter
- Accumet XL25 pH/mV/ISE/ Meter
- Accumet XL20 pH/mV/Conductivity/Resistivity/Salinity/Temperature Meter
- Accumet XL15 pH/mV/Temperature meter

== Fujitsu ==
- Pencentra 130
- Pencentra 200

== Fujitsu-Siemens Computers ==
- Pocket LOOX 600
- Pocket LOOX 610BT
- Pocket LOOX 610BT/WLAN
- Pocket LOOX 410
- Pocket LOOX 420
- Pocket LOOX 710
- Pocket LOOX 718
- Pocket LOOX 720
- Pocket LOOX N500
- Pocket LOOX N520
- Pocket LOOX N560
- Pocket LOOX C550
- Pocket LOOX N100
- Pocket LOOX N110
- Pocket LOOX T810
- Pocket LOOX T830

== Garmin ==
- iQue M5
- iQue M4
- iQue M3

== Hewlett-Packard ==
=== Jornada ===
- Jornada 520 series
- Jornada 540 series
- Jornada 560 series
- Jornada 680 series
- Jornada 690 series
- Jornada 710
- Jornada 720
- Jornada 728
- Jornada 820 handheld
- Jornada 928 Wireless Digital Assistant

Note that the 600, 700 and 800 series were handheld PCs that came before the Pocket PC platform was launched.

=== HP/Compaq iPAQ ===
- H1900
- H1910
- H1920
- H1930
- H1935
- H1940
- H1945
- H2200
- H3630
- H3670
- H3760
- H3850
- H3870
- H3950
- H3955
- H3970
- H3975
- H4150
- H4155
- H5550
- HP2210
- HX2110
- HX2400 Series
- HX2795
- HX2795b
- HX4700
- HX4705
- RX1950
- RX1955
- RX3115
- RX3715
- RX5910
- RZ1715
- HW6500 Series
- 200 Series

== Hitachi ==
- Hitachi G1000

== HTC ==
- HTC Advantage X7500/HTC Athena
- HTC Advantage X7501/HTC Athena
- HTC Advantage X7510
- HTC Alpine
- HTC Amadeus
- HTC Apache
- HTC Artemis/HTC P3300
- HTC Atlas/HTC P4351
- HTC Blue Angel
- HTC Breeze/HTC MTeoR
- HTC Canary
- HTC Cavalier/HTC S630
- HTC Census/HTC P6000
- HTC Charmer
- HTC Cheetah
- HTC Erato/HTC S420
- HTC Excalibur/HTC S620/HTC S621
- HTC Falcon
- HTC Faraday
- HTC Feeler
- HTC Foreseer
- HTC Galaxy
- HTC Gene/HTC P3400i/HTC P3400/HTC P3401
- HTC Gemini
- HTC Harrier
- HTC Herald/HTC P3450
- HTC Hermes
- HTC Himalaya
- HTC Iris/HTC S640
- HTC Kii
- HTC Libra/HTC 5800/HTC S720
- HTC Love/HTC P3350
- HTC Melody/HTC Muse
- HTC Magician
- HTC Monet/HTC S320
- HTC Omni
- HTC Oxygen/HTC S310
- HTC Panda/HTC P6300
- HTC Pharos/HTC P3470
- HTC Prophet
- HTC Robbie
- HTC Rosella/iPAQ H3870/iPAQ H3875
- HTC Sedna/HTC P6500
- HTC Sirius/HTC P6550
- HTC Sonata
- HTC Startrek/HTC S411
- HTC Tanager
- HTC Titan/HTC P4000
- HTC Tornado/HTC Tornado Noble/HTC Tornado Tempo
- HTC Touch/HTC Elf/HTC Ted Baker Needle/HTC Vogue/HTC P3050/HTC P3450/HTC P3452
- HTC Touch Cruise/HTC Touch Find/HTC Polaris/HTC P3650
- HTC Touch Diamond/HTC Victor/HTC P3100/HTC P3700/HTC P3702
- HTC Touch Dual//HTC Nike/HTC P5500
- HTC Touch Find
- HTC Touch HD//HTC Blackstone/HTC T8282
- HTC Touch Pro/HTC Raphael
- HTC Trinity/HTC P3600
- HTC Typhoon
- HTC TyTN/HTC Hermes
- HTC TyTN II/HTC Kaiser
- HTC Vox/HTC S710/HTC S711
- HTC Universal
- HTC Voyager
- HTC Wallaby
- HTC Wave
- HTC Wings/HTC S730
- HTC Wizard/HTC Prodigy/HTC P4300
- HTC P3600i

== i-mate ==
- Momento Digital Photo Frame
- Pocket PC
- Ultimate 8150
- Ultimate 8502
- Ultimate 9502

== IBM ==
- Workpad z50

== JVC ==
- MP-PV131 (never released)

== Jointech ==
- J-Pro JL7100 Mini Laptop

== Kopin Corporation ==
- Golden-i Head Mounted Computer

== LG ==
- LN505 GPS Navigator

== Linksys ==
- Linksys WIP-300 VoIP WIFi phone
- Linksys WIP-330 VoIP WIFi phone

== Magellan Navigation ==
- Magellan RoadMate 1200
- Magellan RoadMate 1412
- Magellan RoadMate 5236
- Magellan Maestro 3100
- Magellan Maestro 4210

== Meizu ==
- Meizu M8

== Mobile Crossing ==
- WayPoint 100 includes CF based GPS
- WayPoint 200 Mobile Crossing includes BT based GPS

== Motorola ==
- Motorola ES400
- Motorola FR68
- Motorola MC17
- Motorola MC35
- Motorola MC50
- Motorola MC55
- Motorola MC65
- Motorola MC70
- Motorola MC75
- Motorola MPx200
- Motorola MPx220
- Motorola MPx300
- Motorola i920/i930
- Motorola Vip 1200

== MWg ==
- Atom Life
- Atom V
- MWg Zinc II
- MWg UBiQUiO 503g
- MWg UBiQUiO 501

== NAVIGON (Personal Navigation Assistant) ==
- 7100
- 5100
- 2100

== NEC ==
- Nec MobilePro

== NTT DoCoMo ==
- Sigmarion series

== O2 ==
- O2 XDA
- O2 XDA II
- O2 XDA IIi
- O2 XDA IIs
- O2 XDA EXEC
- O2 XDA Atom
- O2 XDA Atom Executive
- O2 XDA Atom Life
- O2 XDA Flame
- O2 XDA Orbit
- O2 XDA Stealth

== Opticon ==
- PHL 5200
- PHL 5400
- PHL 8112

== Palm ==
- Treo 500v
- Treo 700w
- Treo 700wx
- Treo 750
- Treo 750v
- Treo 800w
- Treo Pro

== Philips ==
- Philips Nino - bar-style device with touchscreen
- Philips Velo - small-notebook-style device with monochrome display

None of the Philips devices were pocket PCs. The Nino was a salm-Sized PC that preceded the Pocket PC platform and the Velo was the older still handheld PC platform.

== Qtek ==
- Qtek 1010
- Qtek 2020
- Qtek 2020i
- Qtek 9100

== Samsung ==
- Samsung SGH-i700
- Samsung SPH-i700
- Samsung I710
- Samsung I730
- Samsung I740
- Samsung I760
- Samsung I780
- Samsung I900

== Sega ==
- Sega Dreamcast (Windows CE compatible, only used in select titles)

== Silvercrest ==
- Mobile Navigation System PNA-M4310T - a navigation system from the homebrand of Lidl

== Siemens ==
- SX56
- SX66
- P1
- Siemens Sirec D300

== Snap-on Tools ==
- MODIS
- Snap-on SOLUS

== Sophia Mobile ==
- nani

== Sutron Corporation ==
- Xpert Datalogger

== Takara ==
- GPV1004
- GPV1007
- GPV1207
- GPV1208

== ThinCCo ==
- Tisio 90CE
- Tisio 95CE
- Tisio 96CE
- Tisio 300CE

== Trium ==
- Trium Mondo

== Toshiba ==
- e310
- e330
- e335
- e350
- e355
- e400
- e405
- e450
- e550g
- e570
- e740
- e750
- e755
- e800
- e805
- e830
- g500
- g900

== Unitech ==
- MR650
- PA950
- PA962
- PA966

== UTStarcom ==
- PPC-6700 - HTC Apache
- PPC-6800 - HTC Mogul
- PPC-6900 - HTC Touch

== Vadem ==
- Clio 1000
- Clio 1050
- clio NXT

Vadem devices were not pocket PCs but were the older handheld PC platform.

== Viewsonic ==
- V35
- V36
- V37
- V38

== Vivax (available only in Ex-Yu markets) ==
- viaGPS 350

== Yakumo ==
- deltaX 5 BT
- delta 400

== Emulators ==
- Microsoft Windows CE 5.0 Device Emulator (Connectix x86 based)
- Microsoft Device Emulator (Custom ARM CE device emulator developed by Microsoft with source code available)
- GXemul (unconfirmed)
- Virtio Virtual Platforms (c emulate custom ARM and MIPS based Windows CE devices)
- MESS (with mini2440 ARM devboard driver)

== See also ==
- List of Palm OS devices
- List of Windows Mobile devices
