= Jornada =

Jornada, originally an old Spanish word for a day's walk or journey, often indicating a difficult one, can refer to:

== Places ==
- Jornada del Muerto, New Mexico
- Jornada del Muerto Volcano

== Newspapers ==
- Jornada (La Paz), a newspaper published in La Paz, Bolivia
- La Jornada, Mexico City newspaper
- La Jornada (Managua), Nicaraguan newspaper
- La Jornada Latina, Cincinnati weekly newspaper
- Jornada, newspaper in Catalan distributed between May 5 and October 27, 2018.

== Computing technology ==
- Jornada (PDA), line of Hewlett Packard PDAs, including:

- Jornada 560 series

- Jornada Linux Mobility Edition or Jlime, a Linux distribution

== Other ==
- Cabalgata Jornada Villista; see Cavalcade
- Jornada, the longer act of a 17th-century Spanish play, interspersed with entremés
