= S710 =

S710 may refer to:

- HTC S710, a mobile phone
- NW-S710, a Sony walkman series
- Sony Ericsson S710, a Sony Ericsson mobile phone
