= XDA =

XDA may refer to:

- O2 Xda, a brand of smartphone and pocket PC phone
  - XDA Flame, pocket PC device of the O2 Xda device family
- XDA Developers, technology website whose name references the above phone model
- The IATA Code for Seyresse Airport, France
- The ICAO Code for Bureau Veritas, France
