= E355 =

E355 may refer to:

- Adipic acid, industrially important dicarboxylic acid
- Toshiba E355, Pocket PC device by Toshiba
