= HP Jornada 560 series =

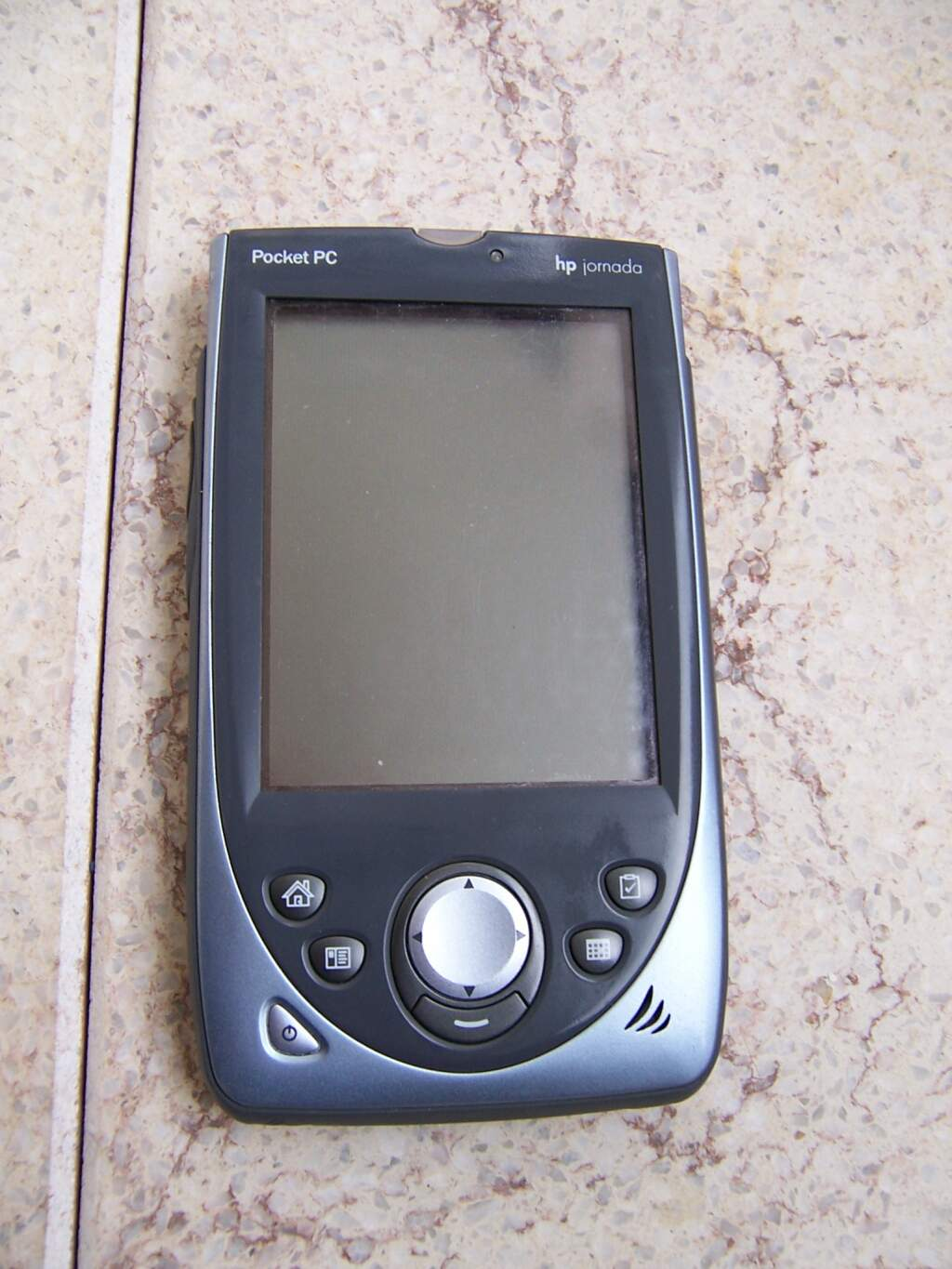
HP Jornada 568

The 560 series was the third and last series of Hewlett-Packard's Pocket PC format Jornada devices. It debuted in October 2001.

== Features ==
- Reflective LCD screen
- Ambient light sensor
- Flashable ROM
- CompactFlash Type I slot
- Four quick-launch hardware keys
- IrDA infra red port
- 8MiB of "Safe Store" flash memory
- 240x320 65,536-colour touch-screen
- Pocket PC 2002 operating system

== Accessories ==
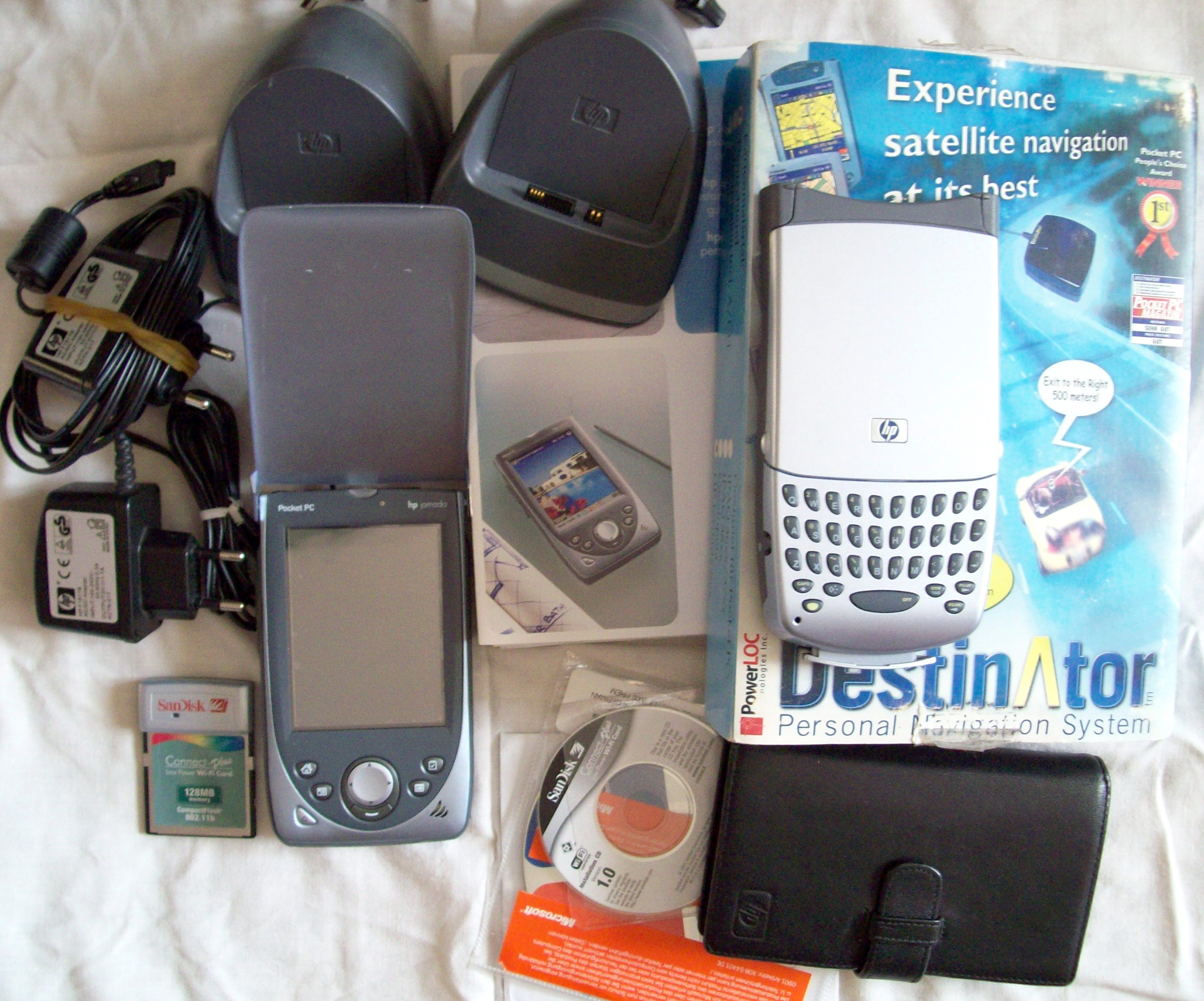
HP Jornada 568 with accessories

- Battery with MMC slot (not compatible with all SD)
- PDA hand-held digital camera with rotating lens PN: F1869A
- original HP Pocket keyboard with "thumbboard" style keys, fits over main unit (see photo)
- other different accessories available from HP or compatible, like GPS, CF WiFi cards etc. (see photo)

== Models ==
| Model number | Part number | RAM | Developer software |
|---|---|---|---|
| 564 | F2899A | 32MiB | |
| 565 | F1865A | 32MiB | Developer One Code Wallet, Developer One Access Panel software |
| 567 | F2921A | 64MiB | |
| 568 | F2915A | 64MiB | Developer One Code Wallet, Developer One Access Panel software |

== Hardware ==
The hardware used in the 560 series is very similar to that of the 7xx Jornadas, and also that of the Assabet development platform.

There are three main hardware differences with the 7xx Jornadas. The 7xx devices feature the following:

- 640x240 screen
- 2D hardware acceleration
- Philips 1344TS audio chip

=== Processor ===
206 MHz Intel StrongARM SA-1110.

The 710, 720, 728, and 820 Jornadas also used this processor.

=== RAM ===
32MiB or 64MiB (see Models).

=== Display controller chip ===
Epson 1356TM.

=== Audio chip ===
Philips UDA1345TS.

This is a low-power, single-chip Analogue-to-Digital Converter and Digital-to-Analogue Converter. It was designed for portable music devices and PDAs.
