= XDA Flame =

Pocket PC device released in 2007

The XDA Flame is a Pocket PC device (also called PDA or Personal Digital Assistant) first released in May 2007, produced by Arima Communications and originally distributed by O2 Asia Pacific & Middle East. This device belongs to a wide O2 Xda device family, including XDA Atom, XDA Atom Life, XDA Zinc, XDA Orbit (aka HTC Artemis), XDA Stealth, XDA II Mini (aka HTC Magician), XDA IIs (aka HTC Blueangel), XDA II (aka HTC Himalaya) and XDA (aka HTC Wallaby). It is one of the first Pocket PC device that was enabled with 3D accelerated graphics nVidia's GoForce 5500 graphic processor (GPU). XDA Flame is also a 3G enabled phone (UMTS 2100 / GSM 900 / GSM 1800 / GSM 1900) with VGA touch screen, 2GB flash memory, 128MB RAM, Intel XScale PXA 270 520 MHz processor and integrated FM radio.

== Specifications ==
As of 2010, the specifications were:

Appearance
Size: 126 x 74 x 17.5 mm (5" x 2.9" x 0.7")
Weight: 190g

Display
Type: TFT touch screen
Colors: 18-bit (262144 colors)
Resolution: 480 x 640 (VGA)
Diagonal: 92 mm (3.6")
Dot pitch: 0.115 mm / px
Viewable area: 55.2 x 73.6 mm (2.2" x 2.9")

Memory
RAM: 128 MB (SDRAM)
Flash (ROM): 2GB (NAND)
Disk-on-chip: 64 MB

CPU
Type: Intel XScale PXA270
Base clock speed: 208 MHz
Clock multiplier: x2.5
Clock speed: 520 MHz
Internal cache memory: 32 KB data / 32 KB instruction
Instruction set: ARMv5TE

GPU
Type: nVidia GoForce 5500
Clock speed: 200 MHz
Embedded SRAM: 640 KB
Stacked memory: 8MB

Audio
Channels: stereo
Microphone: mono
Sampling: 16-bit 44100 Hz
Output: 2.5" jack
Sound system: SRS Surround Sound

Interfaces & peripherals
USB version: 2.0 (host & client)
USB OTG version: 1.2 compliant
USB connector: standard miniUSB type B
USB speed: Full Speed (1.5 MB / s)
IrDA version: 1.2
IrDA protocols: SIR, CIR (long distance)
Bluetooth version: 1.2 or 2.0 (depends on the device version)
WiFi: IEEE 802.11b, IEEE 802.11g
Storage card type: microSD
Storage card capacity: Up to 2GB (SDHC with software upgrade)

Camera
First camera:
Resolution: 1600 x 1200 (~2 MPx)
Sensor type: CMOS
Digital zoom: x8 (max)
LED type: strobe led
Additional features: autofocus

Second camera:
Resolution: 320 x 240 (~0.3 MPx)
Sensor type: CMOS

Battery
Type: LiIon
Capacity: 1620 mAh
Usage time: 2–3 days / 1–2 days / 5 h
(standby mode / standard usage / hard usage)

Additional functions

- Light sensor (disabled by default)
- Remote control capabilities
- TV-out

== Brief history ==
In May 2007, O2 Asia Pacific & Middle East released the XDA Flame. O2's cooperation with nVidia and CodeMonkeys allowed this company to advertise their new product easily, because there was a big demand on the market for a 3D graphics enabled PDA, with a lot of internal memory and many additional functions like USB On-The-Go and TV-out. However, at the end of 2007, O2 began to release new products and they stopped supporting this device, passing all copyrights to a new company called Mobile & Wireless Group (MWg). MWg has released XDA Flame under its own brand with Bluetooth 2.0. Many Flame owners felt a relief knowing that someone will still support their devices. Yet, after a half year, MWg resigned from further supporting this device on its main site and created O2 Asia Support where users can still get a support. In the near future Mwg is planning to release a Flame successor called Flame II with probably Windows Phone 7.

== Device issues ==
XDA Flame has several software bugs. From the beginning MWg's support center have not released a new Windows Mobile 6 version since it appeared on the market. After some time a class action lawsuit page was established to raise awareness of the problem, similar to HTC TyTN II case. In The Point, Tim Osborne wrote:

(...)"We as customers have the right to demand fixes and support for a device that retailed for around $1500 dollars (expensive to say the least). We will also investigate a possible class action suit against O2 / MWG for this as well as lack of support. The class action law suit will only be a last resort if all else fails and information is been seeked on such an action at the moment. We hope that MWG shows itself to be the leading edge company it promotes itself to be and this not be necessary. However as of yet we have had only vague promises of Windows Mobile 6 coming to this device. What we ask is that MWG/O2 do as promised and publicly announce that they will “attempt” to fix these issues and deliver Windows Mobile 6. We are all just looking to use what we purchased nothing more."(...)

Battling with the lack of support by MWG and nVidia, community users have repackaged many Windows Mobile ROM images by their own. After several months dealing with some issues (as sleeping beauty, which caused the device not to wake up from suspension; or a long-standing SDHC problem with Wifi), there have aroused stable and fully functionals ROMs including versions with Windows Mobile 6.1 and SDHC. As of October 2008, community driven support for the Geforce 5500 GPU is still improving but far from fully functional.

== Maintenance ==
- Soft-resetting

To perform soft-reset on XDA Flame - put stylus in a hole next to a microphone.

- Hard-resetting

To perform hard-reset on XDA Flame - while pressing Camera and Comm buttons (two buttons on the left and right at the bottom of the device) soft-reset device. When asked, user should press left soft-key (YES).

== OS updating ==
Operating system (OS) updating, which is also called flashing, is a process similar to installing a new Windows on a PC.

On PDAs, Windows Mobile "disk image" or "ROM image" (archive containing OS files) is installed in internal flash memory.

XDA Flame OS updating steps:

1. microSD card format (FAT, default cluster size).
2. Creating empty .txt file and renaming it to 1xdtgklo.kez.
3. Copying created .kez file and diskimage.nb0 (new ROM image) to a microSD card.
4. Charging device battery over 50%.
5. While keeping pressed both soft key buttons (buttons at the top of keypad with a horizontal line), soft resetting PDA (buttons should be released after the appearing of a bootloader screen).
6. Waiting for the device to finish and soft-reset itself.

== Internal devices ==
- XDA Flame mainboard - Face; XDA Flame mainboard - Reverse; XDA Flame part numbers

1) Intel XScale PXA270
Application Processor
Vendor: Marvell (or Intel, which sold this processor family to Marvell in June 2006)
Product code: PXA270C5C520
Developer's manual: https://web.archive.org/web/20080820054727/http://balloonboard.org/hardware/300/ds/PXA270-dev-manual.pdf
Developer's guide: ARM System Developers Guide

2) 2 × 64MB Hynix low power SDRAM
Vendor: Hynix
Product code: HY5S7B2LFP-H
Frequency 133 MHz, CAS Latency 3, 4banks × 4Mb × 32, interface LVCMOS
Datasheet: https://web.archive.org/web/20071019045810/http://www.hynix.com/datasheet/pdf/dram/HY5S7B2LF(P)-xE_series(Rev1.0).pdf

3) 2 × 32MB Intel StrataFlash wireless memory L18 in stacked chip scale packaging
64MB stacked together into one chip
Vendor: Intel
Product code: 4400L0YTP0
NOR, 1.8 Volt I/O, Individual Chip Enables, Non Mux, x32 Ballout
Quick reference guide: http://sunsite.rediris.es/pub/mirror/intel/flcomp/linecard/qrg.pdf
Resources: http://www.intel.com/design/flcomp/prodbref/251890.htm

4) mDOC H3
2GB NAND Embedded Flash Drive
Vendor: M-Systems (bought by SanDisk in 2006)
Product code: MD2533-d16G-X-P
Extensive datasheet: mDOC H3 Data Sheet Rev 1.2
Brochure: https://web.archive.org/web/20110716002732/http://uk.sandisk.com/Assets/File/OEM/WhitePapersAndBrochures/iNAND/EFD_brochure.pdf

5) LP3971 National Semiconductor power management unit
Chip sign: VM67RA 71-B410
Datasheet: https://web.archive.org/web/20110710170059/http://www.ed-china.com/ARTICLES/2006JUN/3/2006JUN13_PM_POW_TS_4.PDF?SOURCES=DOWNLOAD

6) TSN74AVC16T245 16-bit dual-supply bus transceiver
Chip sign: 61A4R4J G1 WF245
Resources: http://focus.ti.com/docs/prod/folders/print/sn74avc16t245.html

7) bq24032A dual-input Li-ion charger
Chip sign: BPE TI 6BK AHL J
Resources: http://focus.ti.com/docs/prod/folders/print/bq24032a.html

8) TPS65110 Triple Chargepump for LTPS LCD
Resources: http://focus.ti.com/docs/prod/folders/print/tps65110.html

GSM parts:

Ericsson integrated circuits (IC)
A) DB2020 R2A/7 (Baseband processor)
B) DB2102 R1A (Application processor)
C) RF2111 R1A (Radio Frequency processor)
D) RF2101 R1B (Radio Frequency processor)
E) RF2001 R1B/3 (Radio Frequency processor - transmitter)
F) AB2012 R1A (Power management IC)
G) Intel Flash Memory 3050L0YTQ2

H) NVIDIA GoForce 5500 GPU with 8MB stacked memory
Core speed: 200 MHz
Embedded SRAM: 640KB
Stacked memory: 8MB
Technical specifications: http://www.nvidia.com/page/pg_20060207466624.html

I) Wolfson WM9713G Audio and Touchscreen Controller
Resources: http://www.wolfsonmicro.com/products/WM9713/

J) BlueCore4 WLCSP Single Chip Bluetooth v2.1 + EDR System
Vendor: Cambridge Silicon Radio (CSR)
Datasheet: http://www.csrsupport.com/document.php?did=1932

K) SyChip WLAN6101
Vendor: SyChip (subsidiary of Murata)

L) Imagis ISE2200 Video Processor for TV-Out
Technical specifications: http://www.myungmin.com/products/encoder_ISE2200.php

M) Si4701 FM Radio Receiver

Vendor: Silicon Laboratories

Technical specifications: https://web.archive.org/web/20070308132512/http://www.silabs.com/public/documents/tpub_doc/dshort/Broadcast/Radio_Tuners/en/Si4700_01_short.pdf

== Registry tweaks ==
Windows Mobile, like any Windows version, has a Windows registry. Tweaking a registry refers to changing registry entries so that many OS functions will work differently. It is commonly used among Pocket PC users to get the best performance from devices and to get to OS hidden settings.

Known tools for Pocket PC registry editing:

- Total Commander
- Resco Explorer (requires add-in)
- Regedit
- SKTools

WM registry hives:

- HKEY LOCAL MACHINE (HKLM) - this is the main key with all internal device and WM functions. There are all settings connected with drivers, services, connections, installed software, OS design and general data flow.
- HKEY CURRENT USER (HKCU) - this is the key with installed software settings and OS predefined values. There are standard user settings which can also be found in WM user interface.
- HKEY CLASSES ROOT (HKCR) - this is the main core of WM services, files and application - data flow. In this key user can connect file extensions with programs that should use these files. There can also be found Soft Input Panel and other hard coded system applications.

Editing WM registry steps:

1. Navigation to the proper registry entry.
2. Changing its value / creating a new one.
3. Acceptance of all made changes and suspending device for about 30–40 seconds.
4. Soft resetting device.

Most registry entries can be changed by using special .cab files. Those can be made with the help of WinCE CAB Manager for PC (for example). An option that allows user to uninstall such cab file should be unchecked.

The second option for quick registry entries import is through .reg files. Those are standard .txt files saved in Unicode that can be pasted in Total Commander or imported in Resco Explorer.
