= HTC Gene =

PDA smartphone developed by the HTC Corporation

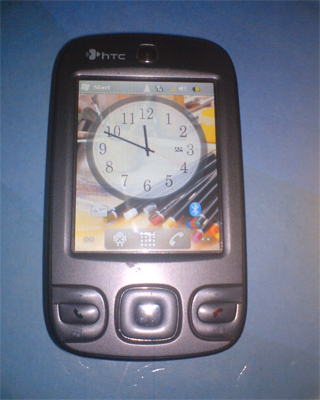
- Manufacturer: HTC Corporation
- Type: Personal digital assistant smartphone Pocket PC
- Compatible networks: Quad-band GSM/GPRS/EDGE (GSM 850, GSM 900, GSM 1800, GSM 1900)
- Weight: 126 g (4.4 oz)
- Operating system: Windows Mobile 6 Professional For HTC Gene P3400i & Windows Mobile 5.0 Pocket PC For HTC Gene P3400
- CPU: TI OMAP 850, 201 MHz processor
- Memory: 64 MiB RAM; 128 MiB ROM
- Removable storage: SD, MMC, SDHC
- Battery: 1250mAh mAH Lithium-ion polymer battery
- Rear camera: 2 megapixel Fixed focus
- Display: 240x320 px, 2.8 in TFT LCD QVGA resistive touchscreen
- Connectivity: USB Mini; Bluetooth 2.0 + EDR + A2DP
- Data inputs: Resistive Touchscreen

The HTC Gene, also known as HTC P3400i or HTC P3400, is a PDA smartphone developed by the HTC Corporation, that was announced in February 2007. It is powered by a TI OMAP 850 200 MHz processor and runs the Microsoft Windows Mobile 6 Professional for HTC Gene P3400i and Microsoft Windows Mobile 5.0 Pocket PC for HTC Gene P3400 operating system. It includes an TFT resistive touchscreen with 65K colors and a 2-megapixel camera. The carrier bound names for this phone include Dopod D600.

== Specification sheet ==
Feature	Specification
Network	Quad-band GSM 850/900/1800/1900
Operating System	Microsoft Windows Mobile 6 Professional for HTC Gene P3400i & Microsoft Windows 5.0 Pocket PC for HTC Gene P3400
Display	TFT resistive touchscreen, 65K colors with 240 x 320 pixels, 2.8 inches
Dimension	109 mm (L) X 58 mm (W) X 17.65 mm (T)
Weight	126 g
CPU	TI OMAP 850, 201 MHz processor
Internal Dynamic Memory (RAM)	64 MB
Read-only memory	128 MB
Camera	2 MP, 1600x1200 pixels
Video recording	Yes
Memory card slot	Yes, SD, MMC, SDIO Up to 32 GB
GPRS	Class 10 (4+1/3+2 slots), 32 - 48 kbit/s
EDGE	Class 10, 236.8 kbit/s
Bluetooth	Yes, v2.0 with A2DP & AVRCP
GPS	NO
Wi-Fi	NO
Infrared	NO
Data cable support	Yes, USB 2.0 via mini USB port
Messaging	SMS, MMS, Email, Instant Messaging
Music player	Yes, Media Player 10 Mobile
Radio	NO
Video Player	Yes, Media Player 10 Mobile
Browser	WAP 2.0/xHTML, HTML (PocketIE)
Java	Yes, MIDP 2.0
Games	Yes, Solitaire, Bubble Breaker
Additional Feature	Pocket Office (Word, Excel, PowerPoint, PDF viewer), Voice memo, MP3/AAC player
Battery	Li-Ion 1250 mAh
Talk time	Up to 5 h
Standby time	Up to 200 h
