= Motorola MPx200 =

Smartphone released in 2003

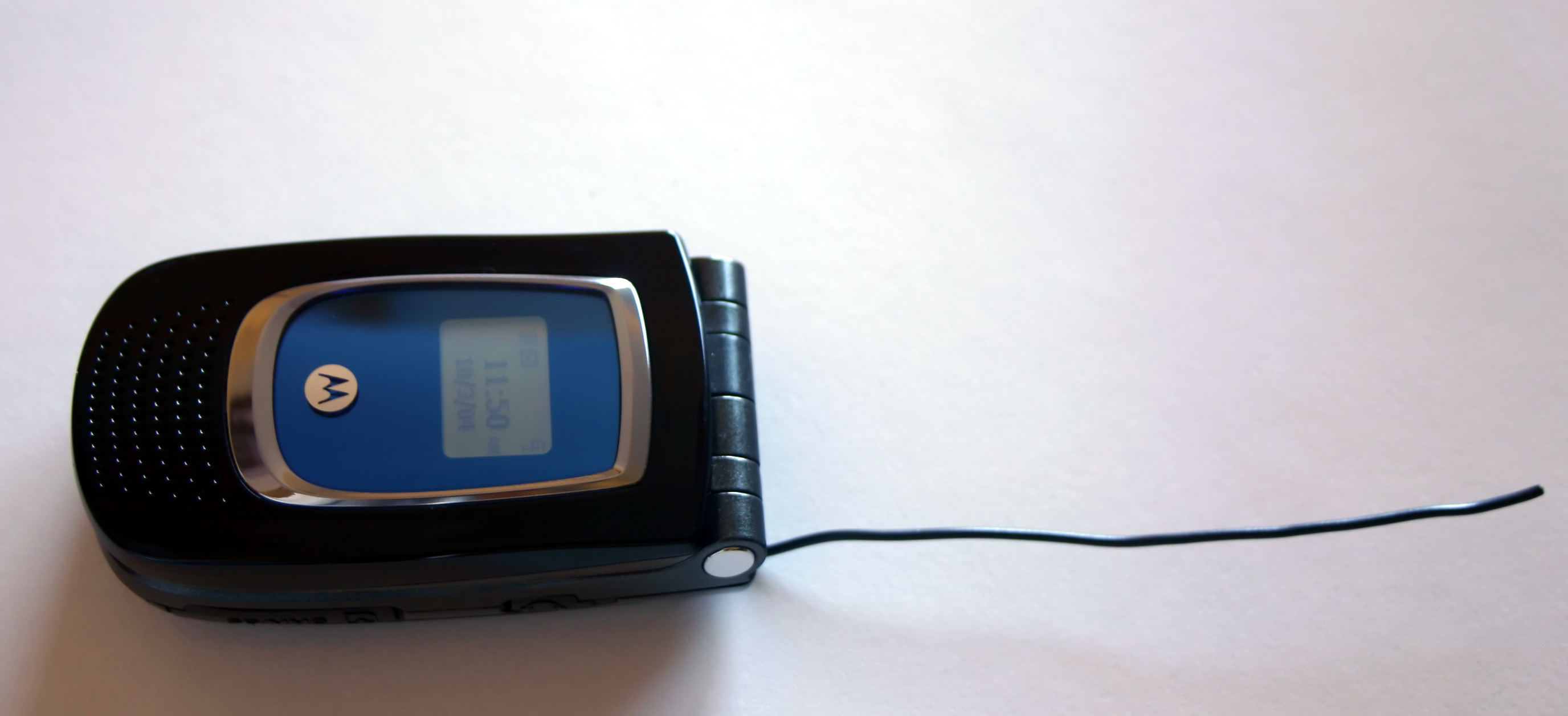
- An MPx200 folded, shown here with a deliberately altered antenna
- First released: December 2003; 22 years ago
- Compatible networks: GSM 900 / 1800 / 1900
- Color: Liquorice Black
- Dimensions: 89×48×27 mm (3.5×1.9×1.1 in)
- Weight: 113 g (4.0 oz)
- Operating system: Microsoft Smartphone 2002
- CPU: 132 MHz Texas Instruments OMAP 710
- Memory: 32 MB RAM
- Storage: 16 MB (8 MB available to user)
- Removable storage: MMC/SD card
- Battery: BA520 standard Li-Ion, 850 mAh
- Display: 2.2 inch 176x220 pixel TFT LCD, 65,536 colors (16-bit), 9 lines
- External display: 80 x 48 pixels monochrome
- Connectivity: GPRS Class 8 (4+1 slots), 32–40 kbit/s speed, browser supports WAP 1.2.1 and HTML (PocketIE). IrDA mini-USB (with USB 1.1 protocol)

Motorola MPx200 is a clamshell-style smartphone introduced on September 15, 2003 as a joint venture between Motorola and Microsoft. It runs on the Windows Mobile Smartphone 2002 operating system and on the GSM/GPRS network (triband 900/1800/1900). The device was notably also the very first Microsoft Windows smartphone released in the United States, where it was carried by AT&T Wireless, although the Samsung SCH-i600 for the CDMA network was released at the same time, carried by Verizon Wireless. In European territories the Motorola MPx200 was carried by Orange.

Motorola MPx200 combined the PDA features of Pocket PCs with the popular 'flip phone' form factor and cellular capabilities while remaining relatively small and light (113 grams (4.0 oz)). It integrates many of the known Windows Mobile features such as Microsoft Office, MSN Messenger, and other email and Internet services. The MPx200 lacked Bluetooth connectivity, however, but did have IrDA. It also had no camera, although an add-on camera called Viewtake CM35D is compatible through the device's SD card slot. A common complaint eventually was that it could not be upgraded to the newer Windows Mobile 2003 for Smartphones version whereas competing products like Samsung's at least offered an official upgrade path. Enthusiastic users reportedly managed to unofficially upgrade the device software to WM 2003.

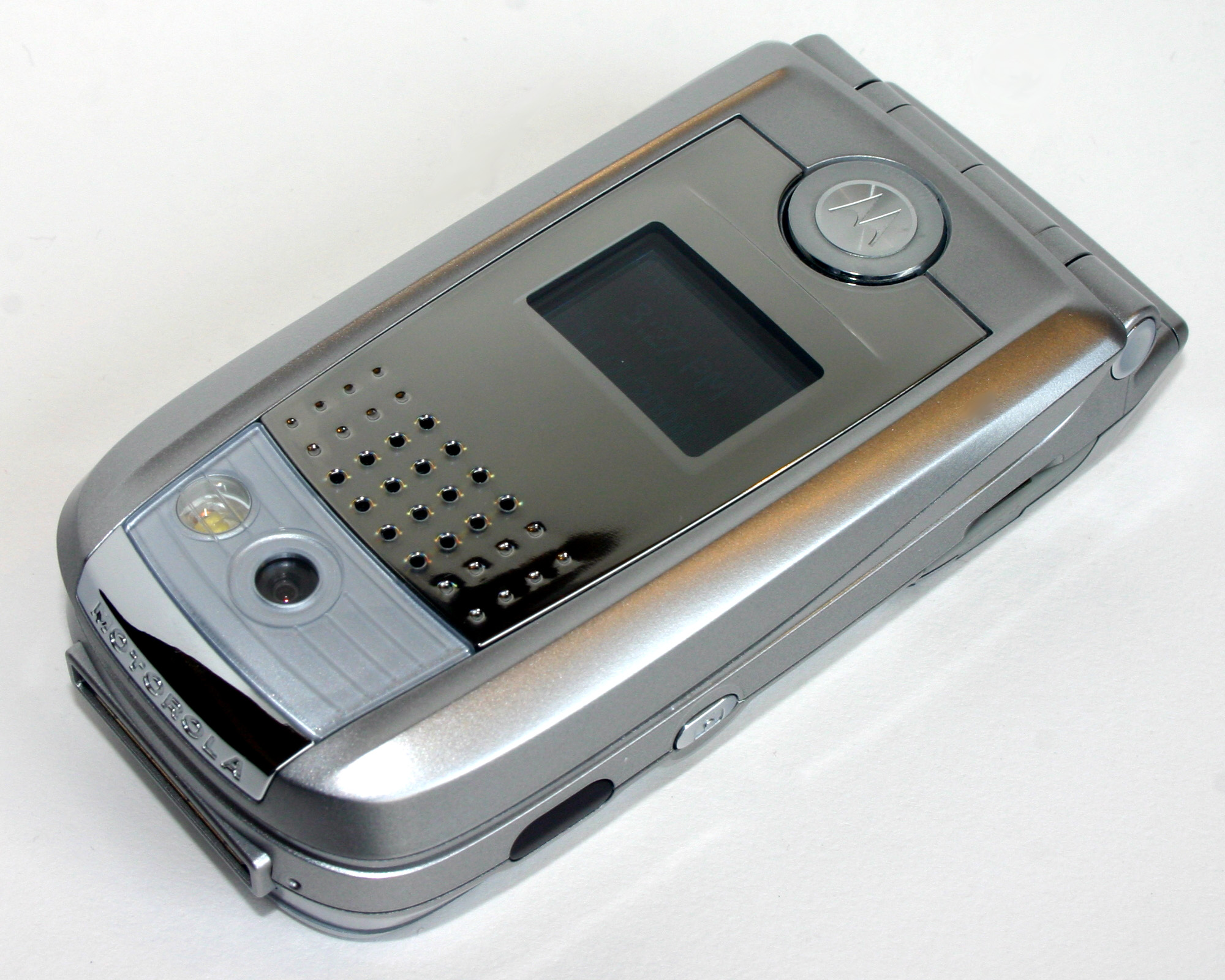
Motorola MPx220, the successor to Motorola MPx200

The Motorola MPx200 was Motorola's first Windows based mobile device and it was launched not long after reports that Motorola would divest its share in Symbian Software. It was considered the next generation of Windows smartphones following the first generation Orange SPV that launched in Europe earlier in 2002. The Motorola MPx200 sold relatively well. It was succeeded by Motorola MPx220, released in late 2004, running Windows Mobile 2003 software and adding both a camera and Bluetooth.
