= Asus P535 =

P535
- Manufacturer: Asus
- First released: November 2006
- Dimensions: 109 by 59 by 19 millimetres (4.29 by 2.32 by 0.75 in)
- Weight: 145 g (5.1 oz)
- Operating system: Windows Mobile 6 Professional
- CPU: Intel XScale PXA27x @ 520 MHz
- Memory: 256 MB NAND flash ROM and 64 MB SDRAM
- Battery: 1300 mAh li-ion
- Rear camera: 2-megapixel autofocus camera with flash
- Display: TFT LCD resistive touchscreen, 16-bit color, 240×320 pixels, 2.8 inches (~143 ppi).
- Connectivity: Wi-Fi 802.11 b/g, Bluetooth 2.0 plus Enhanced Data Rate, USB 1.1

The P535 is a high-performance Pocket PC (PPC) launched by Asus in November 2006. The P535 was designed for and targeted at business managers.

== Network and communication ==
For connectivity, the P535 uses a 2G tri-band (GSM-900/1800/1900 MHz) network; 3G and EDGE are not supported. The 535 still can connect by WLAN (Wi-Fi 802.11 b/g), however.

== Processor and memory ==
The P535 uses a 520-MHz Intel XScale PXA27x CPU, which was the leading mobile chipset in 2006. Users can switch the CPU mode to several power management modes, including "Power Saving", "Standard", or "Turbo". The PPC was released with 64 MB of SDRAM and can support up to 128 MB of SDRAM.

== Features ==
The Asus P535 has 2.0 megapixel autofocus camera with LED flash, macro mode, and video mode. The screen has a resolution of 240×320 pixels and a color depth of 16 bits. There is a li-ion battery with a capacity of 1300 mAh.

At the time, the Asus P535 provided advanced communication functions and a high-performance CPU. According to a couple of reviewers, however, the fast CPU resulted in excess energy drain, which led to a shorter battery life than other contemporary PPC devices.

On release, the P535 ran with Windows Mobile 5.0. Asus later released an upgrade patch to Windows Mobile 6 Professional for it.

== Reception ==
Wayne Cheah and Reuben Lee of CNET Asia gave the P535 a score of 7.4 out of 10, praising the performance of the CPU, its compactness, and its feature set while criticizing its poor battery life, its "dull-looking design", and its lack of a standard 3.5 mm headphone jack. In testing its ability to place calls, they found the quality and reception "good, whether this was from the handset, speakerphone or headset. As expected, the faster processor makes the PDA-phone more responsive, especially when handling multimedia files. Operating the PDA-phone was also generally smooth with hardly any lag experienced". The Bangkok Post also praised the P535, calling it "one of the most powerful PDA phones to date". Tech2 meanwhile was critical of the touchscreen and found the Windows Mobile interface slightly clunky. Softpedia's Cosmin Vasile wrote that "[e]very piece of equipment included in the [P535] works like a charm, so I can't say anything bad about it", but that the lack of 3G and EDGE connectivity and a physical keyboard were points against it. Like Cheah and Lee, Vasile found the design dull.
