= HTC Advantage X7500 series =

Smartphone manufactured by HTC

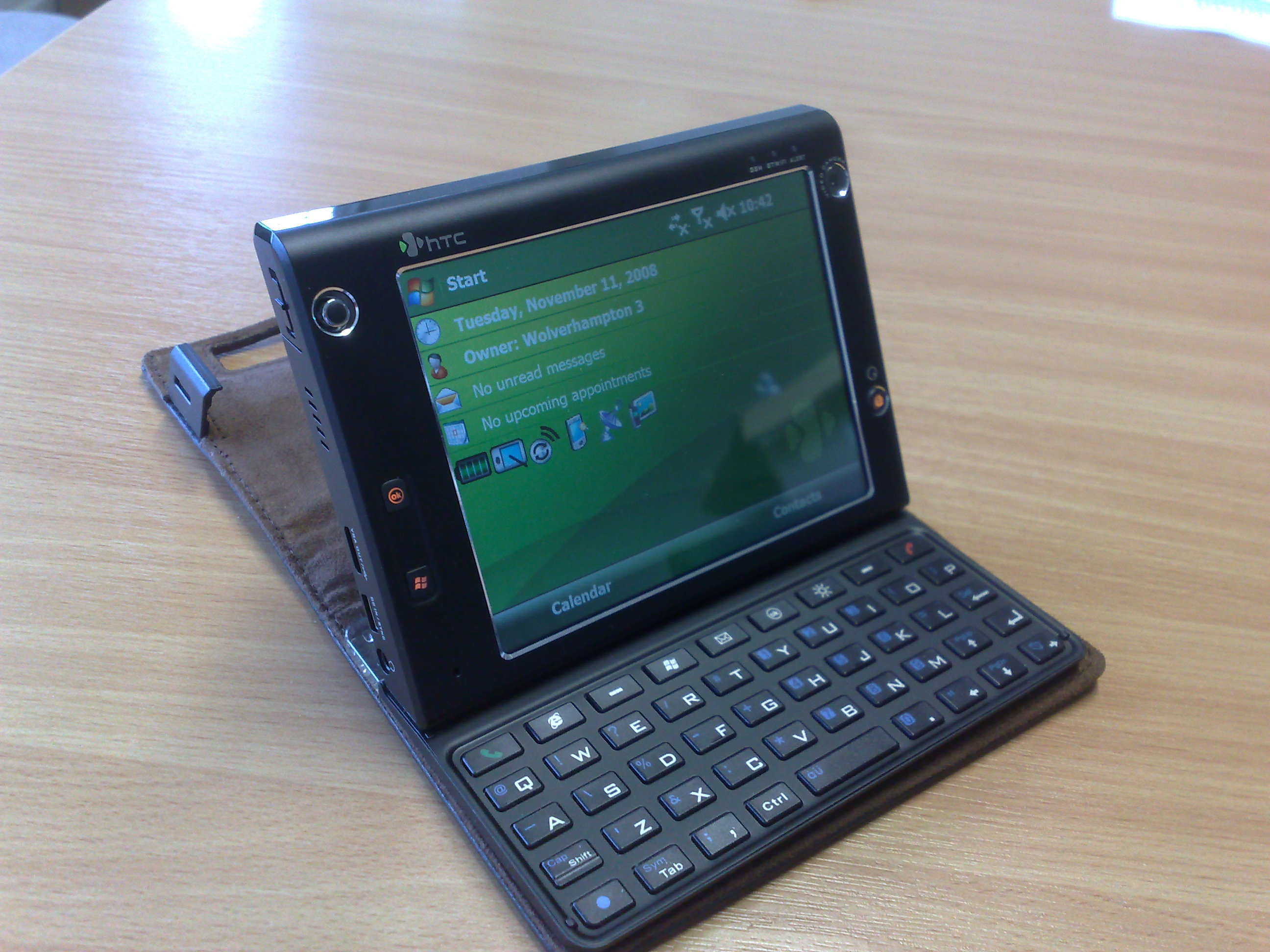
A photo of an HTC Athena

The HTC Advantage X7500 series were a collection of mobile phones that sold under the HTC Advantage X7500 or HTC Athena label. They were a Windows Mobile 5.0 Pocket PC Phone Edition based smartphone designed and manufactured by HTC. The Athena was sold by T-Mobile US under the name T-Mobile Ameo. The Ameo launched in Europe in March 2007. It was also sold under the Dopod brand as the Dopod U1000.

The HTC Advantage X7501 is a Windows Mobile 6.0 version released in July 2007 as an OEM unlocked GSM phone by CompUSA and Amazon.com primarily for the North American market as a Pocket PC. It does not have the second camera which the Advantage X7500 has for videoconferencing.

The HTC Advantage X7510 is an updated version of the X7500, featuring Windows Mobile 6.1 "Manilla" Professional Edition, a solid state drive, and a 16GB flash drive. The X7510 model also brings back the secondary VGA camera on the screen side for videoconferencing.

== Specifications ==
A full specifications sheet was leaked on January 26, 2007.

Function	Component
OS	Microsoft Windows Mobile 5.0 Pocket PC Phone Edition for X7500 (T-Mobile Optional Update to WM6) (Windows Mobile 6 Professional for X7501)
Dimensions	133'5mm x 97'7mm x 16mm, 360g
Processor	Intel Bulverde PXA270 624 MHz; ATI technologies Imageon 2284
Memory	ROM: 256 MB, RAM: 128 MB SDRAM, HDD: 8GB with G sensor
Display	5", LED backlight TFT LCD touchscreen, VGA(640x480)
Communication	HSDPA/UMTS (Triband, 850/1900/2100 MHz); GSM/GPRS/EDGE (Quad band, 850/900/1800/1900 MHz)
GPS	SiRFstarIII GPS Chipset
Camera	Main Camera: 3.0 MPx, auto-focus 2nd Camera: VGA (not available X7501), LED flash
Connectivity & Interface	USB 2.0; Bluetooth 2.0 A2DP; WiFi IEEE 802.11b/g 20 channel integrated GPS; 3V USIM/SIM card slot miniSDHC slot TV-out; USB 1.1 Host (low power) through proprietary 16 pin port
Battery	Sanyo Lithium-Ion 2200mAH
Applications	MMS/Java apps Smart Dialing/Voice Speed Dialing; Adobe Acrobat LE PDF; Blackberry Push Email Client
