= HTC P3600 =

Smartphone by HTC Corporation

HTC P3600 (codename Trinity) is a handheld PC by HTC Corporation.

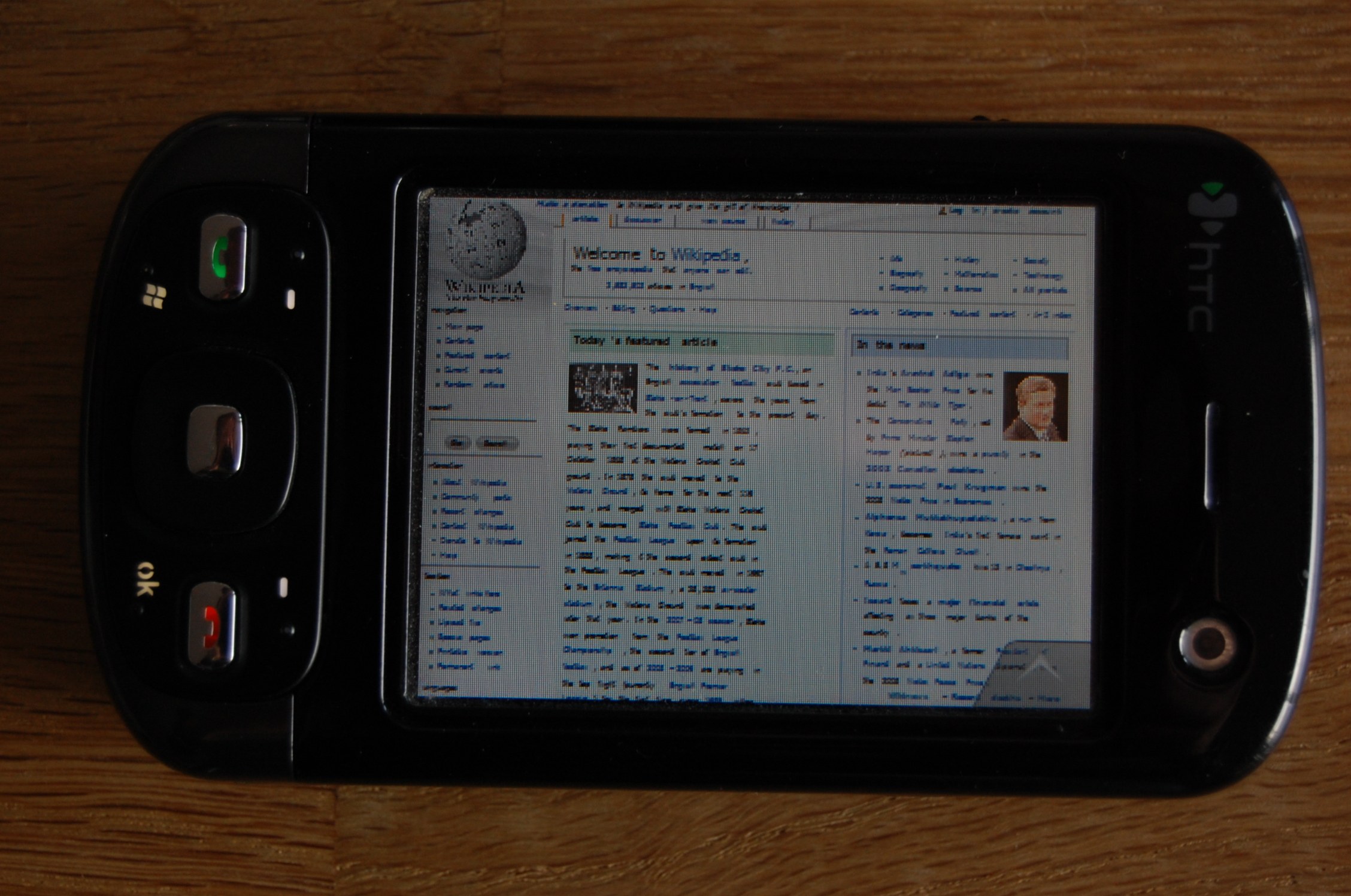
Trinity or P3600 showing the Wikipedia.org mainpage

Features include:

- Quad-band GSM/GRPS/EDGE
- Tri-band UMTS/HSDPA
- 802.11b/g Wifi
- Bluetooth 2.0
- GPS
- Irda
- USB 1.1

== Features ==
- Communications
  - UMTS / HSDPA tri band: UMTS 850, UMTS 1900, UMTS 2100
  - GPRS / EDGE / GSM quad band: GSM 850, GSM 900, GSM 1800, GSM 1900
- Integrated GPS
