= Casio Cassiopeia =

PDA product line by Casio

Cassiopeia
- Developer: Casio
- Manufacturer: Casio
- Type: Handheld PC; Personal digital assistant (Pocket PC)
- Released: February 1997; 29 years ago
- Lifespan: 1997 – c. 2008
- Discontinued: c. 2008; 18 years ago
- CPU: Various

Cassiopeia was the brand name of several PDAs manufactured by Casio. Earlier models ran the Windows CE operating system, with later versions running Pocket PC or Windows Mobile. Casio was one of the first manufacturers of PDAs, developing at the beginning small pocket-sized computers with keyboards and grayscale displays and subsequently moving to smaller units in response to customer demand.

== Cassiopeia A-10, A-11 and A-11+ ==
- Operating system: Microsoft Windows CE 1.0 Handheld PC edition
- Size: 175 mm × 92 mm × 26.5 mm :: 380 g
- CPU: Hitachi SH-3 at 44 MHz
- Memory: RAM 2 MB and ROM 4 MB
- Display: FSTN LCD, 480 x 240 Pixel, 4 shades of gray
- Interface: Serial and IrDA (ver. 1.0)
- Expansion slot: PC card Type II
- Battery: 2x AA, up to 20 hours of running time; CR2032 for memory protection
- Input: Keyboard and Touch Screen
- Extras: Speaker
- 1997 Feb

== Cassiopeia A-20, A-21S, A-22T, A-23G ==
- Operating system: Microsoft Windows CE 2.0 Handheld PC edition
- Size: 185 mm × 94 mm × 24.5 mm :: 430 g
- CPU: Hitachi SH3 at 80 MHz
- Memory: RAM 8 MB and ROM 8 MB
- Display: FSTN LCD, 640 x 240 Pixel, 4 shades of gray
- Interface: Serial and IrDA (Infrared) (ver. 1.0)
- Expansion slots: CompactFlash Type I and PC card Type II
- Battery: 2x AA,(And rechargeable battery pack) up to 25 hours of running time; CR2032 for memory protection
- Input: Keyboard and Touch Screen
- Extras: Speaker, Microphone
- 1999 May

It was quickly discovered that most consumers wanted smaller devices, so the Palm-size PCs were developed. Japanese models of these units differ in both model number as well as appearance. The E-5x and/or E-5xx models are Japanese versions, colored blue instead of silver. The following versions were developed; A21-S for Student, A22-T for Teachers, A-23G for German (with QWERTZ keyboard), A-20F for French (with AZERTY keyboard).

== Cassiopeia A-50, A-51, A-55 and A-60 ==
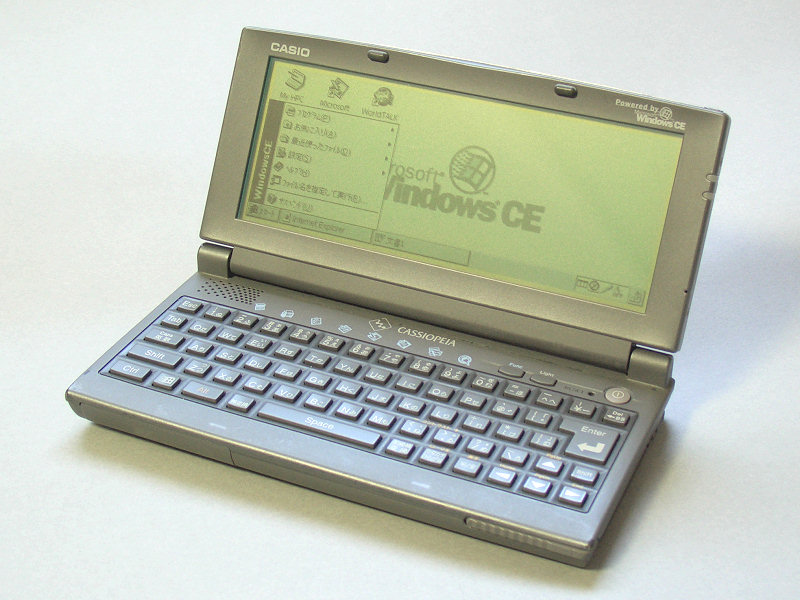
Cassiopeia A-60

- Operating system: Microsoft Windows CE 1.01 and 2.0 Handheld PC edition
- Size: 185 mm × 94 mm × 24.5 mm
- CPU: Hitachi SH3 at 80 MHz
- Memory: RAM 4 or 8 MB and ROM 8 MB
- Display: FSTN LCD, 480 x 240 Pixel, 4 shades of gray
- Interface: Serial and IrDA (Infrared) (ver. 1.0)
- Expansion slots: CompactFlash Type I and PC card Type II
- Battery: 2x AA,(And rechargeable battery pack) up to 25 hours of running time; CR2032 for memory protection
- Input: Keyboard and Touch Screen
- Extras: Speaker, Microphone

== Cassiopeia E-10 ==
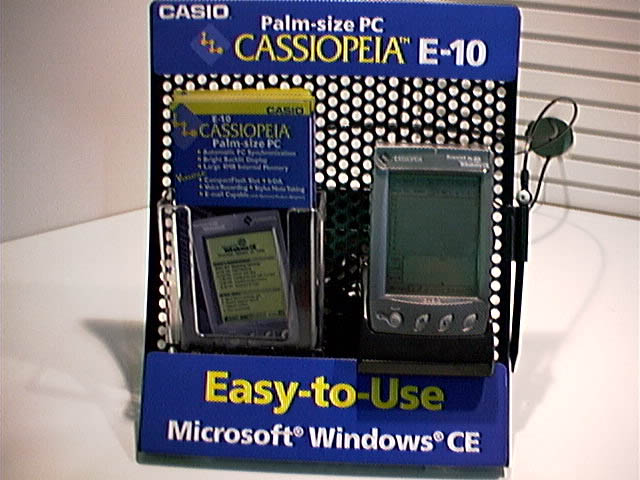
Cassiopeia E-10

- Operating system: Microsoft Windows CE 2.01 Palm-size PC edition
- Size: 80 mm × 120 mm × 20 mm :: 184 g
- CPU: NEC VR4111 MIPS at 69 MHz
- Memory: RAM 4 MB and ROM 8 MB
- Display: FSTN LCD, 240 x 320 Pixel, 4 shades of gray
- Interface: Serial and IrDA (ver. 1.0)
- Expansion slots: CompactFlash Type I and II
- Battery 2x AAA, up to 25 hours of running time; CR2016 for memory protection
- Input: Touch Screen, Microphone, 4 user-configurable buttons and a control pad
- Extras: Speaker and Stereo 3.5 mm headphone jack

== Cassiopeia E-11 ==
- Operating system: Microsoft Windows CE 2.01 Palm-size PC edition
- Size: 80 mm × 120 mm × 20 mm :: 184 g
- CPU: NEC VR4111 MIPS at 69 MHz
- Memory: RAM 8 MB and ROM 8 MB
- Display: FSTN LCD, 240 x 320 Pixel, 4 shades of gray
- Interface: Serial and IrDA (ver. 1.0)
- Expansion slots: CompactFlash Type I and II
- Battery 2x AAA, up to 25 hours of running time; CR2016 for memory protection
- Input: Touch Screen, Microphone, 4 user-configurable buttons and a control pad
- Extras: Speaker and Stereo 3.5 mm headphone jack
- 1998 Sep

== Cassiopeia E-15 ==
The Cassiopeia E-15 was the last model of Palm-size PC introduced by Casio that used a grayscale display. It appeared at the same time as the E-105, and functioned identically to that device, except for the screen.

- Operating system: Microsoft Windows CE 2.11 Palm-size PC edition
- Size: 127 mm × 80 mm × 15.2 mm :: 190 g
- CPU: NEC VR4111 MIPS at 69 MHz
- Memory: RAM 16 MB and ROM 16 MB
- Display: FSTN LCD, 240 x 320 Pixel, 16 shades of gray
- Interface: Serial and IrDA (ver. 1.0)
- Expansion slots: CompactFlash Type I and II
- Battery 2x AAA rechargeable, up to 25 hours of running time; CR2032 for memory protection
- Input: Touch Screen, Microphone, 3 user-configurable buttons, a control pad
- Extras: Speaker and Stereo 3.5 mm headphone jack

== Cassiopeia E-100 ==
The first Palm-size PC model by Casio to have a color screen, the E-100 was outwardly identical to the E-15.

- Operating system: Microsoft Windows CE 2.11 Palm-size PC edition
- Size: 81.2 mm × 132 mm × 20.1 mm :: 255 g
- CPU: NEC VR4121 MIPS at 131 MHz
- Memory: RAM 16 MB and ROM 16 MB
- Display: HAST LCD, 240 x 320 Pixel, 65536 colors
- Interface: Serial and IrDA (ver. 1.0)
- Expansion slots: CompactFlash Type I and II
- Battery: Li-Ion rechargeable, up to 6 hours of running time; CR2032 for memory protection
- Input: Touch Screen, Microphone, 3 user-configurable buttons, a control pad.
- Extras: Speaker and Stereo 3.5 mm headphone jack

== Cassiopeia E-105 ==
- Operating system: Microsoft Windows CE 2.11 Palm-size PC edition
- Size: 81.2 mm × 132 mm × 20.1 mm :: 255 g
- CPU: NEC VR4121 MIPS at 131 MHz
- Memory: RAM 32 MB and ROM 16 MB
- Display: HAST LCD, 240 x 320 Pixel, 65536 colors
- Interface: Serial and IrDA (ver. 1.0)
- Expansion slots: CompactFlash Type I and II
- Battery: Li-Ion rechargeable, up to 6 hours of running time; CR2032 for memory protection
- Input: Touch Screen, Microphone, 3 user-configurable buttons, a control pad.
- Extras: Speaker and Stereo 3.5 mm headphone jack

== Cassiopeia E-115 ==
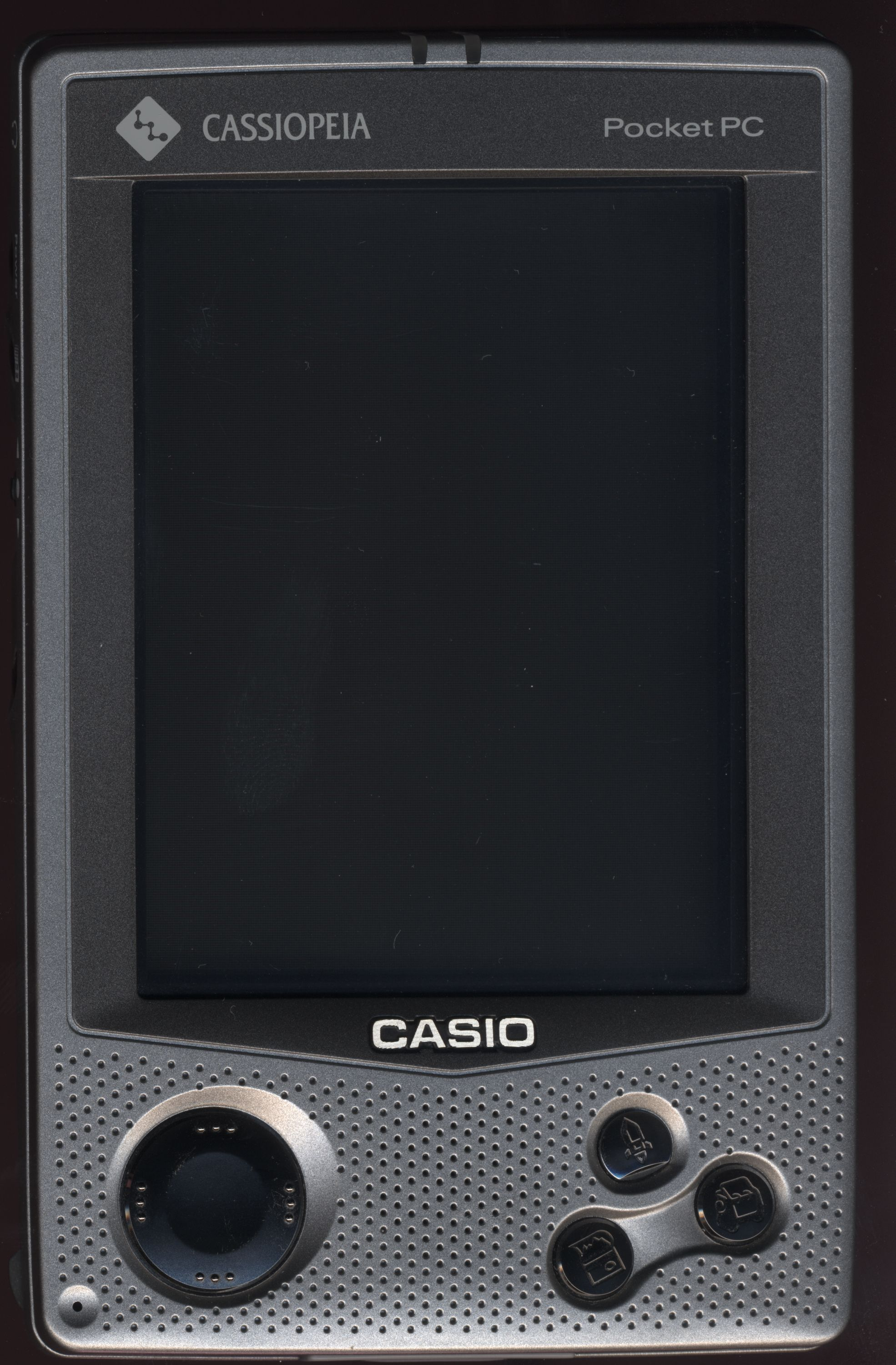
Cassiopeia E-115

- Operating system: Microsoft Windows CE 3.0 PocketPC edition
- Size: 81.2 mm × 132 mm × 20.1 mm :: 256 g
- CPU: NEC VR4121 MIPS at 131 MHz
- Memory: RAM 32 MB and ROM 16 MB
- Display: HAST LCD, 240 x 320 Pixel, 65536 colors
- Interface: Serial and IrDA (ver. 1.2)
- Expansion slots: CompactFlash Type I and II
- Battery: Li-Ion rechargeable, up to 6 hours of running time; CR2032 for memory protection
- Input: Touch Screen, Microphone, 3 user-configurable buttons, a control pad.
- Extras: Speaker and Stereo 3.5 mm headphone jack

Casio always advertised the fact that their devices could be updated. Casio decided it would not issue an update for the E-100 and E-105, and a lot of owners of the devices complained. Because of the complaints, Casio offered to update the devices to the newest version of the operating system if the owners sent in the device and paid a fee. Since the operating system was stored in ROM and not flash memory, the only way to upgrade was by replacing the ROM.

== Cassiopeia E-125 ==
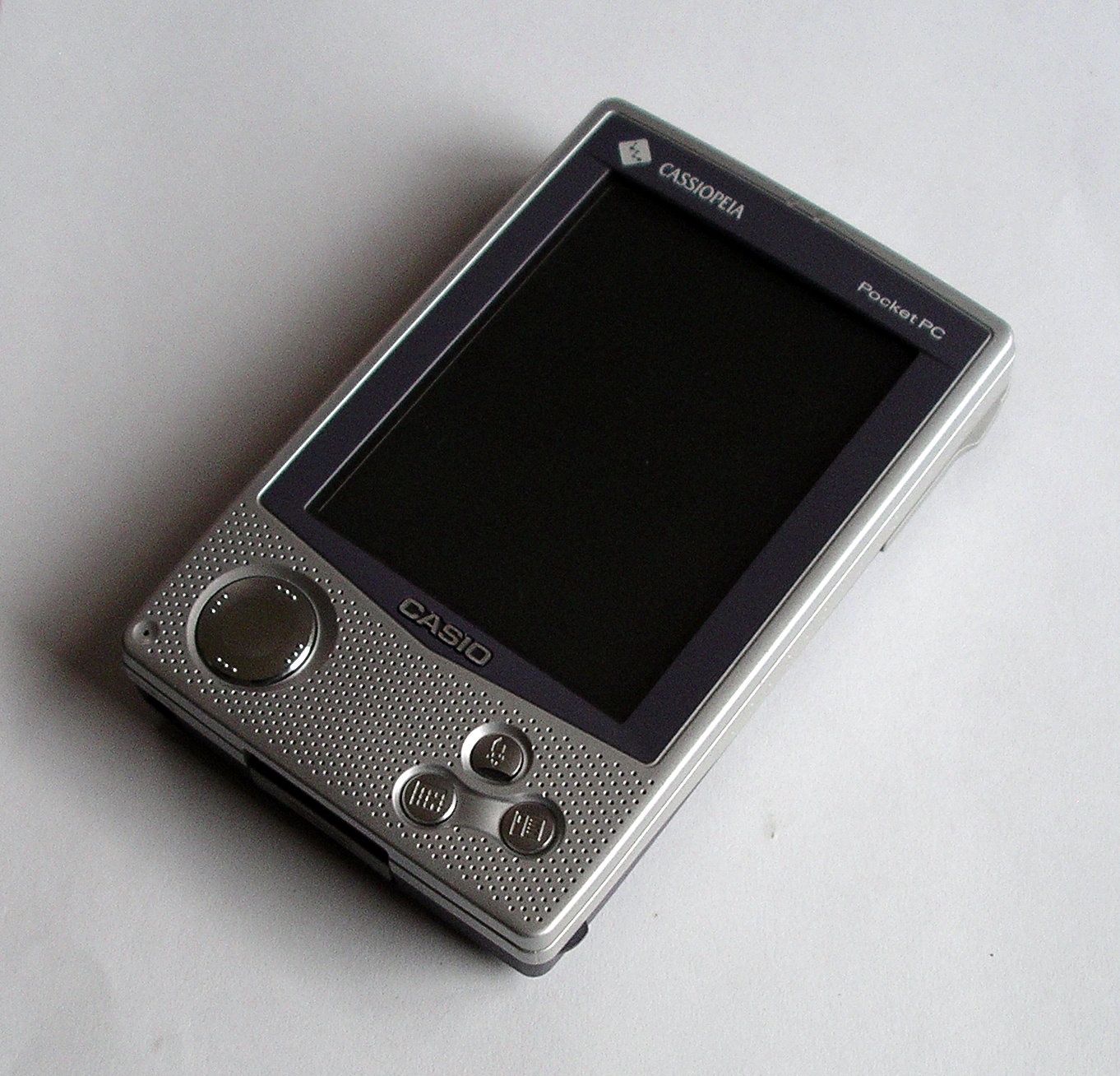
Cassiopeia E-125

- Operating system: Microsoft Windows CE 3.0 PocketPC edition
- Size: 81.2 mm × 132 mm × 20.1 mm :: 256 g
- CPU: NEC VR4122 MIPS at 150 MHz
- Memory: RAM 32 MB and ROM 16 MB
- Display: HAST LCD, 240 x 320 Pixel, 65536 colors
- Interface: Serial/USB and IrDA (ver. 1.2)
- Expansion slots: CompactFlash Type I and II
- Battery: Li-Ion rechargeable, up to 6 hours of running time; CR2032 for memory protection
- Input: Touch Screen, Microphone, 3 user-configurable buttons, a control pad.
- Extras: Speaker and Stereo 3.5 mm headphone jack

After using the MIPS processor in the E-15 and the E-1xx series devices, the E-200 switched over to the StrongARM CPU, in keeping with Microsoft's specifications.

== Cassiopeia E-200 ==
- Operating system: Microsoft PocketPC 2002
- Size: 82 mm × 130 mm × 17.5 mm :: 190 g
- CPU: Intel StrongARM 1110 at 206 MHz
- Memory: RAM 64 MB and ROM 32 MB
- Display: TFT, 240 x 320 Pixel, 65536 colors
- Interface: Serial/USB and IrDA (ver. 1.2)
- Expansion slots: SD Card (MultiMediaCard) and CompactFlash Type I and II as well as PC card via an extension module
- Battery: Li-Ion rechargeable, up to 12 hours of running time CR2032 for memory protection
- Input: Touch Screen, Microphone, 3 user-configurable buttons, a control pad.
- Extras: Speaker and Stereo 3.5 mm headphone jack
- 2001 Dec

== Cassiopeia Fiva ==
The Cassiopeia Fiva family was a series of subnotebook PCs.

The Casio Cassiopeia Fiva MPC-205E/ MPC-206E / MPC-216XL used the Transmeta Crusoe CPU.

Other Casio Cassiopeia Fiva devices used the Cyrix MediaGX CPU.

== Successors of the Cassiopeia E-200 ==
After experiencing difficulties in the market following the release of the E-200, Casio decided not to produce any further units for the US and European markets, instead focusing on the Japanese market. Japanese-only models included the Cassiopeia E-3000, which ran the Pocket PC 2002 operating system, and the DT-10, which ran Windows Mobile 2003.

== Other models ==
- Compaq C120/C140/C120+ are rebranded equivalents to the Cassiopeia A-10/A-11/A-10+.
- E-55 Japanese version of the E-15
- E-707 Japanese model with wireless/phone antenna and both SD and CF card slots.
- E-5xx Japanese versions of the E-1xx models.
- EM-500 USA model, slightly smaller than the USA E-1xx with 16 MB RAM and came in multiple colors.
- E-700 Japanese version of the EM-500, but with 32 MB RAM and came in many additional colors like white, carbon, silver.
- E-750 Japanese successor to the E-1xx series with 32 MB RAM and a 200 MHz MIPS CPU.
- E-3000/3100 Later Japanese model with 400 MHz XSCALE CPU and CF + SD card slots. 3000/3100 ran PPC/CE.NET respectively.
- SX-45 designed in cooperation with Siemens, this is a Cellphone integrated with an E-125.
- BE-300 Pocket Manager (not a Pocket PC) running on Windows CE 3.0 with a Casio-designed user interface. Released in 2001.
- PA-2400W (SH3 80 MHz, 8 MB RAM, 16 MB ROM, 480 × 240 4-level grayscale touchscreen, Windows CE 2.11)
- IT-10 M20 from 2005 Rugged (IP54 Rated) Windows Mobile 2003/2 416 MHz Intel PXA270 (800 MIPS at 624 MHz) 64 MB RAM, 64 MB ROM 3.7-inch VGA Transflective (640 × 480 TFT, 65536 colours) screen with 2,300 mAh lithium-ion battery (up to 27 hours use) & CompactFlash and SDIO slots
