= HTC Magician =

Mobile phone

- Dimensions: 10.6×5.7×1.8 cm (4.17×2.24×0.71 in)
- Weight: 150 g (5 oz)
- Operating system: Windows Mobile 2003
- CPU: Intel(R) XScale "Bulverde" PXA272 416 MHz CPU
- Memory: Flash ROM: 64 MB, RAM: 64 MB SDRAM
- Removable storage: SDIO/MMC card slot
- Battery: 1200mAh
- Rear camera: VGA Camera (1.3MP)
- Display: QVGA Screen
- Connectivity: GSM/GPRS (Tri Band), IrDA, and Bluetooth.

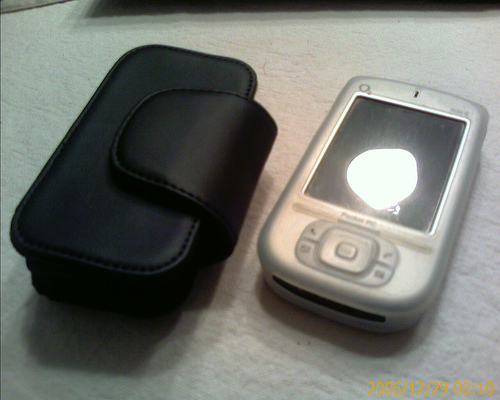
As O_{2} XDA II Mini

The HTC Magician is a Windows Mobile 2003 Second Edition PDA-phone, manufactured by High Tech Computer Corporation and released in December 2004. It is sold by many different vendors under the names of Qtek S100, O2 Xda II Mini (Asia), O2 Xda mini (Germany), T-Mobile MDA compact, i-mate JAM, Vodafone VPA Compact, Dopod 818, Krome Spy, and Orange SPV M500. Despite the names and appearances all have the same hardware specifications. The i-mate Jam has a slightly different fascia which requires modification to be retrofitted to other magicians.

Among the first generation of Pocket PC phone devices to be designed with a small form factor, the Magician received much interest from consumers and largely positive comments from reviewers. As the O_{2} XDA II Mini, it received an "excellent" rating from CNET Asia, scoring 8.3 out of 10 points as well as winning CNET Asia's 2005 Reader's Choice Awards.
