= Jlime =

Jlime Linux
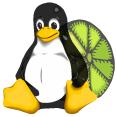

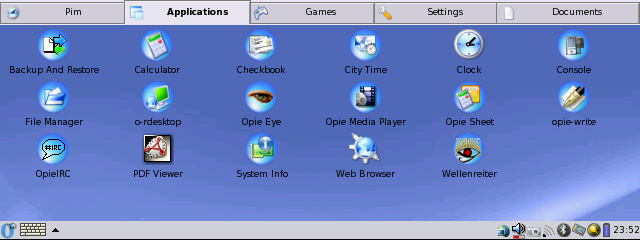
- Developer: Kristoffer Ericson and Jlime Community
- OS family: Linux (Unix-like)
- Source model: Open source
- Latest release: 1.01 / November 6, 2006
- Supported platforms: SH3 (Jornada 6xx); ARM (Jornada 7xx, MobilePro 900/900c); MIPS (Ben Nanonote, MobilePro 7xx/8xx)
- Kernel type: Monolithic kernel
- Default user interface: Console, OPIE, IceWM
- License: GPL
- Official website: (defunct) www.jlime.com

Jornada Linux Mobility Edition or JLime is a defunct Linux distribution originally aimed for the HP Jornada platform. It was created in late 2003 by Kristoffer Ericson and Henk Brunsting. It was developed using the OpenEmbedded build system.

== See also ==
- Familiar Linux
- Jornada (PDA)
- HP Jornada X25
- MobilePro
- OpenEmbedded
