= Jornada (La Paz) =

JORNADA
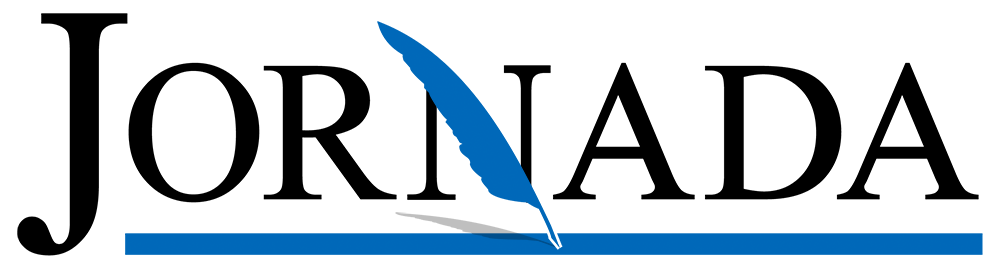
- Type: Daily newspaper
- Format: Tabloid
- Owner: AURIOS
- Founded: 4 November 1964; 61 years ago
- Language: Spanish
- City: La Paz
- Country: Bolivia
- Website: jornada.com.bo

Jornada is a newspaper published in La Paz, Bolivia. The newspaper began publication in November 1964.
