= Pocket LOOX =

Series of personal digital assistants and navigation devices

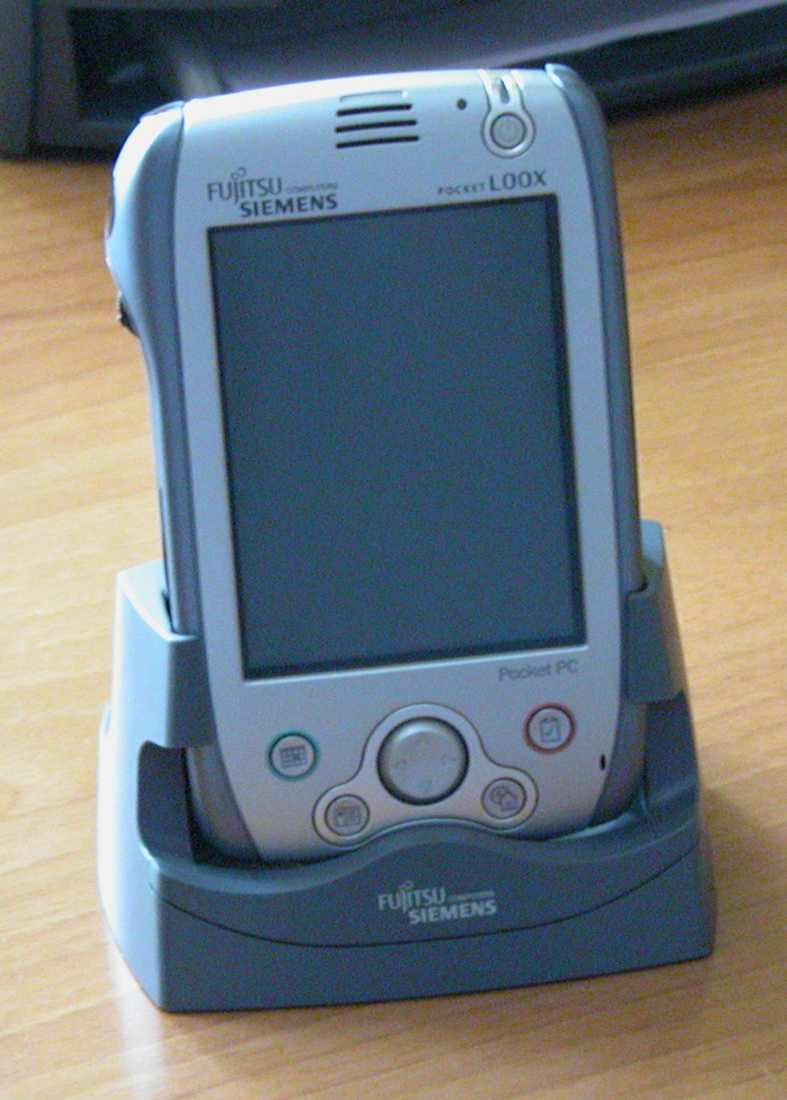
- Pocket LOOX 600
- Manufacturer: Fujitsu Siemens
- Type: PDAs & navigation systems
- Released: 2002
- Discontinued: 2007
- Operating system: Pocket PC; Windows Mobile; Windows CE
- CPU: Intel XScale; Samsung

Pocket LOOX was a series of Pocket PC-based personal digital assistants (PDAs) and portable navigation devices developed by Fujitsu Siemens, introduced in 2002 with the Pocket LOOX 600 and discontinued in 2007. The range included several PDA families with Microsoft Pocket PC and Windows Mobile, as well as navigation systems with integrated GPS and Navigon MobileNavigator software.

== Model families ==
=== PDA models ===
Pocket LOOX 600 was the first PDA by Fujitsu Siemens and HTC, released in 2002. It had a built-in Bluetooth module and two expansion slots, SD/MMC and CF. Fujitsu Siemens later released a GPRS expansion module that provides mobile phone functionality.

Model	RAM (MiB)	ROM (MiB)	Slots	CPU	MHz	OS	Screen resolution	WiFi	Bluetooth	IrDA	More
Pocket LOOX 400 series
Pocket LOOX 410	64	32	1SD	PXA255	300	WM 2003	320×240	No	Yes	Yes	
Pocket LOOX 420	64	32	1SD	PXA255	400	WM 2003	320×240	802.11b	Yes	Yes	
Pocket LOOX 600 series
Pocket LOOX 600	64	32	1SD 1CF	PXA250	400	PPC 2002, WM 2003*	320×240	No	Yes	Yes	Optional GPRS module
Pocket LOOX 610 BT	64	64	1SD 1CF	PXA255	400	WM 2003	320×240	No	Yes, 1.1	Yes	
Pocket LOOX 610 BT/WLAN	64	64	1SD 1CF	PXA255	400	WM 2003	320×240	802.11b	Yes, 1.1	Yes	
Pocket LOOX 700 series
Pocket LOOX 710	64	64	1SD 1CF	PXA272	416	WM 2003 SE	320×240	802.11b	Yes, 1.2	Yes	
Pocket LOOX 718	128	64	1SD 1CF	PXA272	520	WM 2003 SE	640×480	802.11b	Yes, 1.2	Yes	
Pocket LOOX 720	128	64	1SD 1CF	PXA272	520	WM 2003 SE	640×480	802.11b	Yes, 1.2	Yes	1.3 MP camera with flash
Pocket LOOX C series
Pocket LOOX C550	64	64	1SD	PXA270	520	WM 5.0 Premium	640×480	802.11b/g	Yes, 1.2	Yes	
Pocket LOOX N series
Pocket LOOX N100	0–4 M	64	1 MiniSD	SAMSUNG SC32442	300	WM 5.0 Premium	320×240	No	No	No	GPS, no PDA navigation only
Pocket LOOX N500	64	64	1 SD	PXA270	312	WM 5.0 Premium	320×240	No	No	Yes	GPS
Pocket LOOX N520	64	128	1 SD	PXA270	312	WM 5.0 Premium	320×240	802.11b/g	No	Yes	GPS
Pocket LOOX N560	64	128	1 SD	PXA270	624	WM 5.0 Premium	640×480	802.11b/g	Yes, 1.2	Yes	GPS
Pocket LOOX T series
Pocket LOOX T810	64	128	1 SD	PXA270	416	WM 5.0 Phone Edition	240×240	802.11b/g	Yes, 2.0	No	GSM/UMTS Module, GPS
Pocket LOOX T830	64	128	1 SD	PXA270	416	WM 5.0 Phone Edition	240×240	802.11b/g	Yes, 2.0	No	GSM/UMTS Module, GPS, VGA camera for video calls, 2 MP camera with autofocus

- Pocket LOOX 600 can be upgraded to Windows Mobile 2003.

=== Navigation models ===
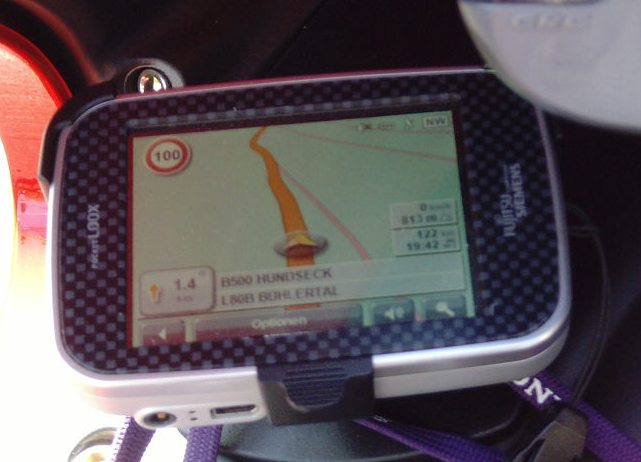
Pocket LOOX N110

Pocket LOOX navigation systems were powered by Navigon MobileNavigator|6s. There were 9 maps supplied with device, covering 37 European countries. Main difference between N100 and N110 is that N100 did not have any built-in user accessible memory, but came with 1 GB MiniSD card. N110 on the other hand had 2 GB built-in memory and a free MiniSD expansion slot.

Model	RAM (MiB)	ROM	Slots	CPU	OS	Screen resolution
Pocket LOOX N100	64	N/A	1 MiniSD	Samsung 300 MHz	Windows CE 5.0	320×240
Pocket LOOX N110	64	2GB	1 MiniSD	Samsung 300 MHz	Windows CE 5.0	320×240

== Alternative operating systems ==
The Pocket LOOX 600 has unofficial support for the Linux operating system through the loox-linux project. The port supports Linux kernel up to version 2.4.19, with the system typically booted from a CompactFlash card. This allows a way return to PocketPC 2002, but due to the device’s volatile memory architecture, all data stored in RAM is lost upon booting Linux.

Work is being done to port Android to Pocket Loox 720. A port of Android 2.2 is running on the 720. It is possible to boot from either CF or SD cards; as mentioned above, a backup of all data is highly recommended.

== See also ==
- Fujitsu Siemens Computers
- List of Fujitsu products
- Personal digital assistant
- Windows Mobile
- Pocket PC
