= HTC S730 =

Smartphone

HTC Wings
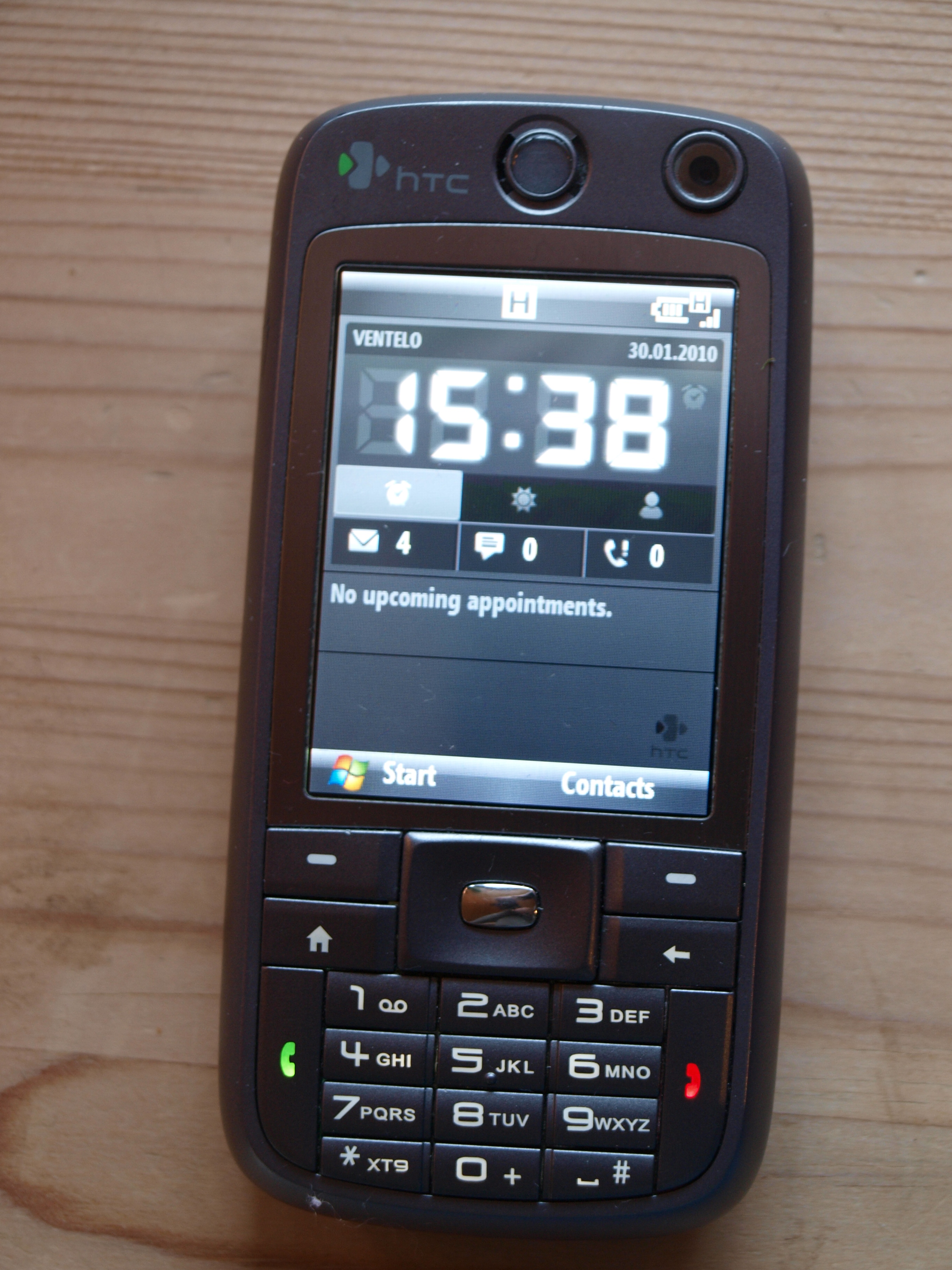
- Manufacturer: HTC
- Availability by region: 2007; 19 years ago
- Compatible networks: HSDPA (3.5G), Quad band GSM / GPRS / EDGE GSM 850, GSM 900, GSM 1800, GSM 1900
- Form factor: Slider
- Dimensions: 105.8×51×19.4 mm (4.17×2.01×0.76 in)
- Weight: 150 g (5 oz)
- Operating system: Microsoft Windows Mobile 6.0 Standard
- CPU: Qualcomm MSM7200, 400 MHz processor
- Memory: 64 MB Ram and 256MB ROM
- Removable storage: MicroSD, microSDHC
- Battery: lithium polymer
- Rear camera: 2 Megapixels (Back)
- Front camera: CIF video call (Front)
- Display: 2.4 in, 240x320 px
- Connectivity: USB 2.0, Bluetooth 2.0, Wi-Fi b/g
- Data inputs: Keypad, extendable QWERTY keyboard

HTC S730, also known as HTC Wings, is a smartphone from HTC. The phone is a member of HTC's line with phones equipped with QWERTY-keyboards.

== History ==
The phone was made available in late 2007. It uses Windows Mobile technology and is powered by Windows Mobile 6 Standard.

HTC has used slogans such as "Let's get down to business." and "Keep in touch no matter where you are in the world." when marketing the device.

== Properties ==
=== Keyboard ===
The device has an extendable keyboard - "qwerty", available in localized versions, which simplifies SMS and smartphone functions. There's also a standard numeric keyboard located under the screen.

=== Multimedia ===
The device can also act as a music player supporting formats such as MP3, WMA, AAC, AAC+, eAAC+, WAV, QCELP, MPEG4, AMR-NB and AMR-WB.

=== Internet ===
The device can be connected to wireless networks using 802.11 b/g (WLAN), it supports the Skype-protocol which can be used to make calls when connected to a wireless network.

== Battery ==
The device uses a 1,050 mAh rechargeable Li-Ion Polymer battery.

== Rumours ==
=== Integrated GPS system ===
The device is said to contain a GPS chip but lacks the software to use it; also, the integrated GPS chip has no antenna and therefore it can only connect to 1-2 satellites (usually at COM4 at 4800 or 9600 baud). HTC has not officially stated that the device would contain any GPS functionality, however GPS functions have been demonstrated by HTC on preview versions of the device.

== See also ==
- High Tech Computer Corporation, a Taiwan-based manufacturer of handheld devices
