= Casio BE-300 =

Handheld PC by Casio Computer Co. Ltd

- Manufacturer: Casio Computer Co. Ltd
- Released: June 25, 2001
- Operating system: Windows CE
- CPU: 166 MHz MIPS CPU
- Memory: 16 MB of RAM.
- Removable storage: Compact Flash
- Display: 320×240 touch-screen LCD
- Input: Resistive Touchscreen
- Weight: 167 g (5.9 oz)
- Website: Official website

The Cassiopeia BE-300 Pocket Manager was a personal digital assistant manufactured by Casio Computer Co. Ltd and first released June 25, 2001. In Japan, it was also marketed as BE-500. The Cassiopeia BE-300 used a cut-down version of Windows CE 3.0 that was not fully compatible with Windows CE applications. It featured a 32 thousand colors 320×240 touch-screen LCD, a 166 MHz MIPS CPU, and 16 MB of RAM. It was also equipped with a CompactFlash slot, allowing for the expansion of internal memory with external flash memory cards as well as the use of peripheral CF-compatible devices such as Wireless and network adapters. Enthusiast reviews of the device were mixed with some excited about the hacking possibilities and the low price and others were dismissive of the device. In the general press it received modestly positive reviews.

The BE-300 was reasonably hackable and a community grew up dedicated to modifying it.

== See also ==
- Casio Cassiopeia
