= HTC S710 =

HTC S710, HTC Vox, Orange SPV E650, Vodafone v1415, Dopod C500
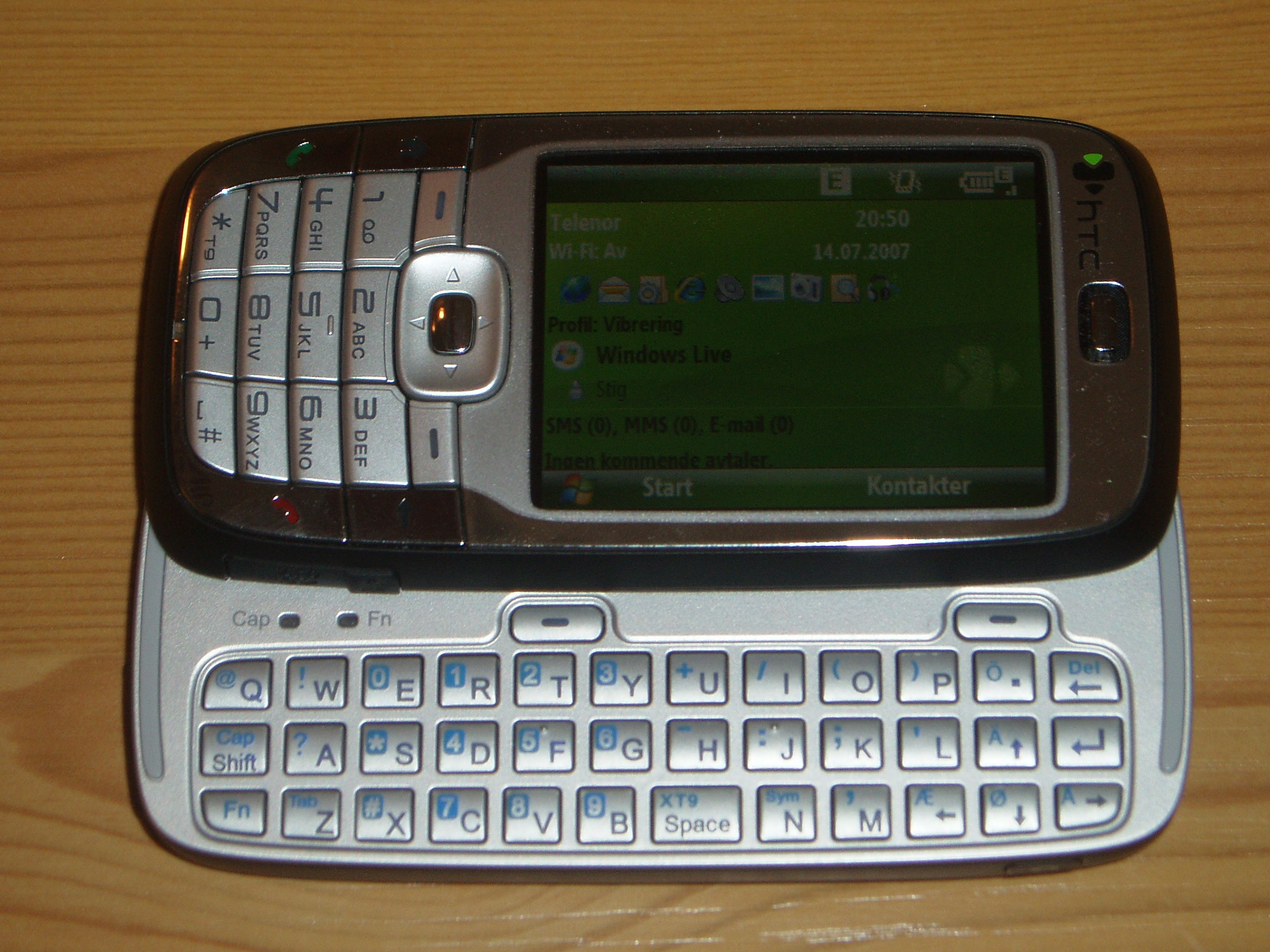
- Compatible networks: GSM/GPRS/EDGE Quad-band module (850/900/1800/1900MHz)
- Dimensions: 101.5 mm(L) x 50 mm(W) x 18.6 mm(T)
- Weight: 140 g (5 oz) (with battery)
- Memory: 64Mb
- Display: 240 x 320 color transflective TFT 2.4”, 65536 colors (16-bit color depth)
- Connectivity: Bluetooth 2.0, Wi-Fi: IEEE 802.11b/g, HTC ExtUSB (11-pin mini-USB and audio jack in one)
- SAR: 0.803 W/kg @10g

The HTC S710 (a.k.a. HTC Vox) is a mobile phone manufactured by HTC. As with other HTC models it is often sold carrier branded.

Some highlights include:

- Based on the Windows Mobile 6 Standard platform
- TI OMAP 850 Performance : 200 MHz Processor from Texas Instrument
- Auto-sliding QWERTY keyboard for easier typing
- Large 2.4” QVGA TFT LCD (Portrait and Landscape modes)
- Receive e-mails as they arrive with Direct Push technology
- Improved Calendar functionalities
- Windows Live (although not in the Orange version)
- Windows Vista synchronization via Windows Mobile Device Center

== Availability ==
As of June 2007 available from Orange SA, Vodafone and others. Manufacturing has ceased for this product.
