= HP Jornada =

Line of Personal Digital Assistants from Hewlett Packard

Jornada

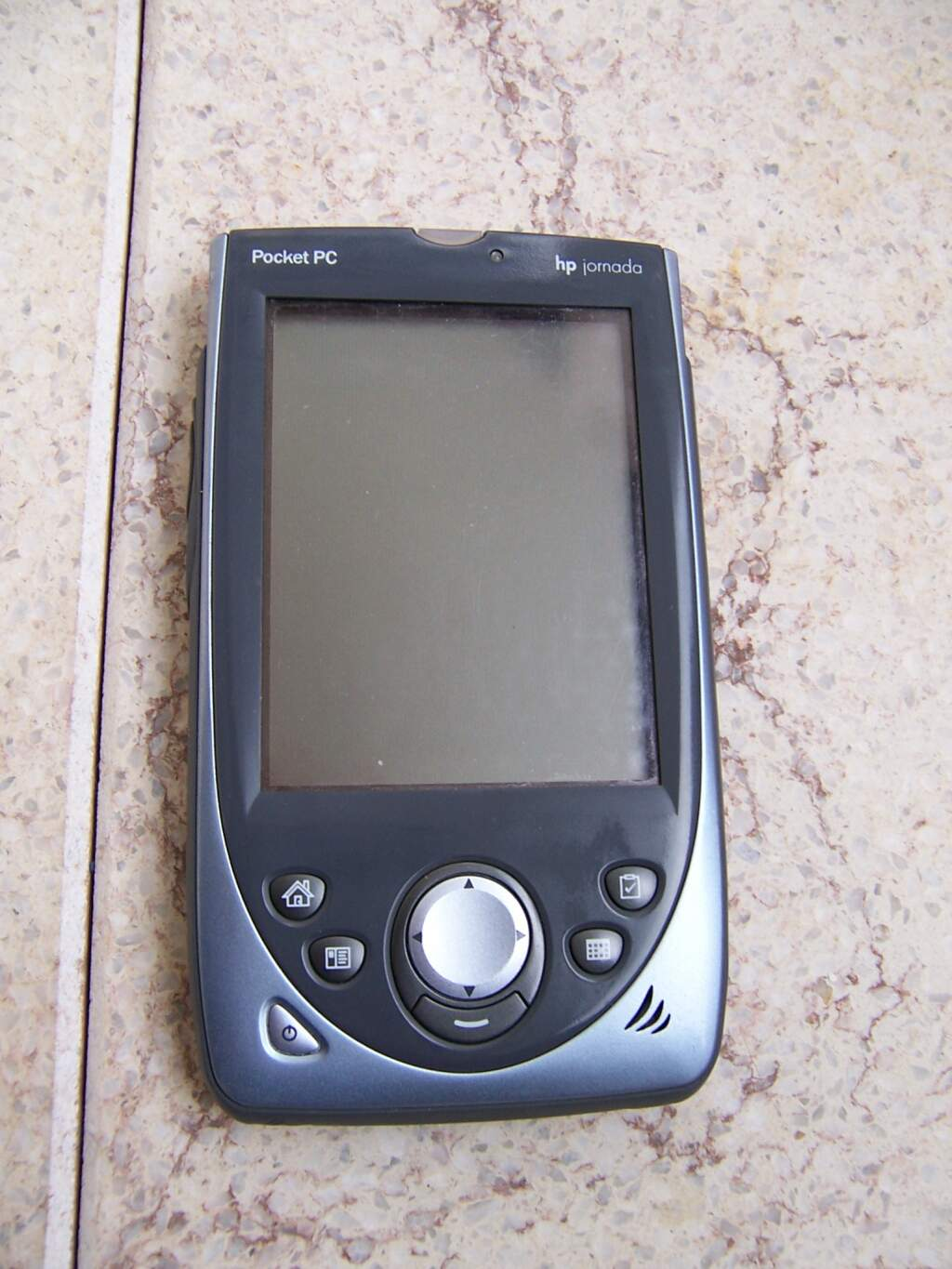
- HP Jornada 560
- Manufacturer: Hewlett-Packard
- Type: Personal digital assistant
- Released: 1998; 28 years ago
- Lifespan: 1998–2002
- Discontinued: 2002; 24 years ago
- Operating system: Windows CE
- CPU: Various; see § Models
- Website: hp.com/jornada at the Wayback Machine (archived 2000-08-15)

The Jornada was a line of personal digital assistants or PDAs manufactured by Hewlett-Packard. The Jornada was a broad product line that included Palm-Size PCs, Handheld PCs, and Pocket PCs. The first model was the 820, released in 1998, and the last was the 928 model in 2002 when Compaq and HP merged. The Jornada line was then succeeded by the more popular iPAQ model PDAs. All Jornada models ran Microsoft Operating Systems that were based on Windows CE.

== Models ==
=== Handheld PCs ===
==== Jornada 820/820e ====
Introduced in 1998, the Jornada 820 ran on the Windows CE 2.11 operating system, Handheld PC Professional Edition 3.0, had a small trackpad with two buttons and a built-in miniature keyboard. It had 16 MB of RAM, 16 MB of ROM, Intel StrongARM CPU at 190 MHz, 640x480 256 color screen, 1 CF Type II, 1 PC card. It had a 10-hour battery life, and allowed for sending and receiving of faxes through its built-in modem. There is a software update to Handheld PC Professional Edition 3.01/Service Pack 1, and a 16 MB RAM upgrade card, bringing the RAM to a total of 32 MB. There is also an extended battery available, giving the Jornada 820 15 hours of running time, versus 10 in the standard battery. The Jornada 820 was bundled with TrueSync 2.0 to allow native synchronisation support for the Franklin Rex Classic and Rex Pro PDA.

The Jornada 820e was identical to the Jornada 820 except that it lacked the integrated 56 kbit/s modem.

==== Jornada 680/680e ====
The Jornada 680 was released in 1998. It was an HVGA Handheld PC running the Windows CE 2.11 based Handheld PC Professional 3.0. The device had a 133 MHz Hitachi SH3 processor with 16 MB of integrated RAM and a 16 MB ROM. The internal RAM/ROM configuration could be upgraded to 32 MB/HPC 3.01 through a user upgrade kit. The HP HVGA screen operated at 256 colours with a driver update providing 64K color support. Compact flash cards (including those of at least 4 GB) and PCMCIA memory cards could be used simultaneously. The PCMCIA card slot could be used for modems, network cards (including WiFi), VGA adapters and many more.

The Jornada 680e was identical to the Jornada 680 except that it lacked the integrated 56 kbit/s modem.

==== Jornada 690/690e ====
The Jornada 690 was released in 1999. It was an HVGA Handheld PC running the Windows CE 2.11 based Handheld PC Professional 3.01. The device had a 133 MHz Hitachi SH3 processor with 32 MB of integrated RAM and a 16 MB ROM. The HP HVGA screen operated at 64K colour.

The Jornada 690e was identical to the Jornada 690 except that it lacked the integrated 56 kbit/s modem.

==== Jornada 710 ====
The Jornada 710 was released in 2001 into the European / Middle Eastern Market place. It featured 32 MB of RAM, a Compact Flash slot, a PC card slot, a smart card slot, 640x240 16-bit display, and a 206 MHz StrongARM SA1110 CPU. It also ran on HPC2000, however the package differed from the higher end 720 and 728, making the 710 a lower cost alternative. The 710 did not ship with an integrated 56 kbit/s modem, and it is not possible to add one as an upgrade. It had a scaled down CD bundle and came without a docking cradle.

==== Jornada 720 ====
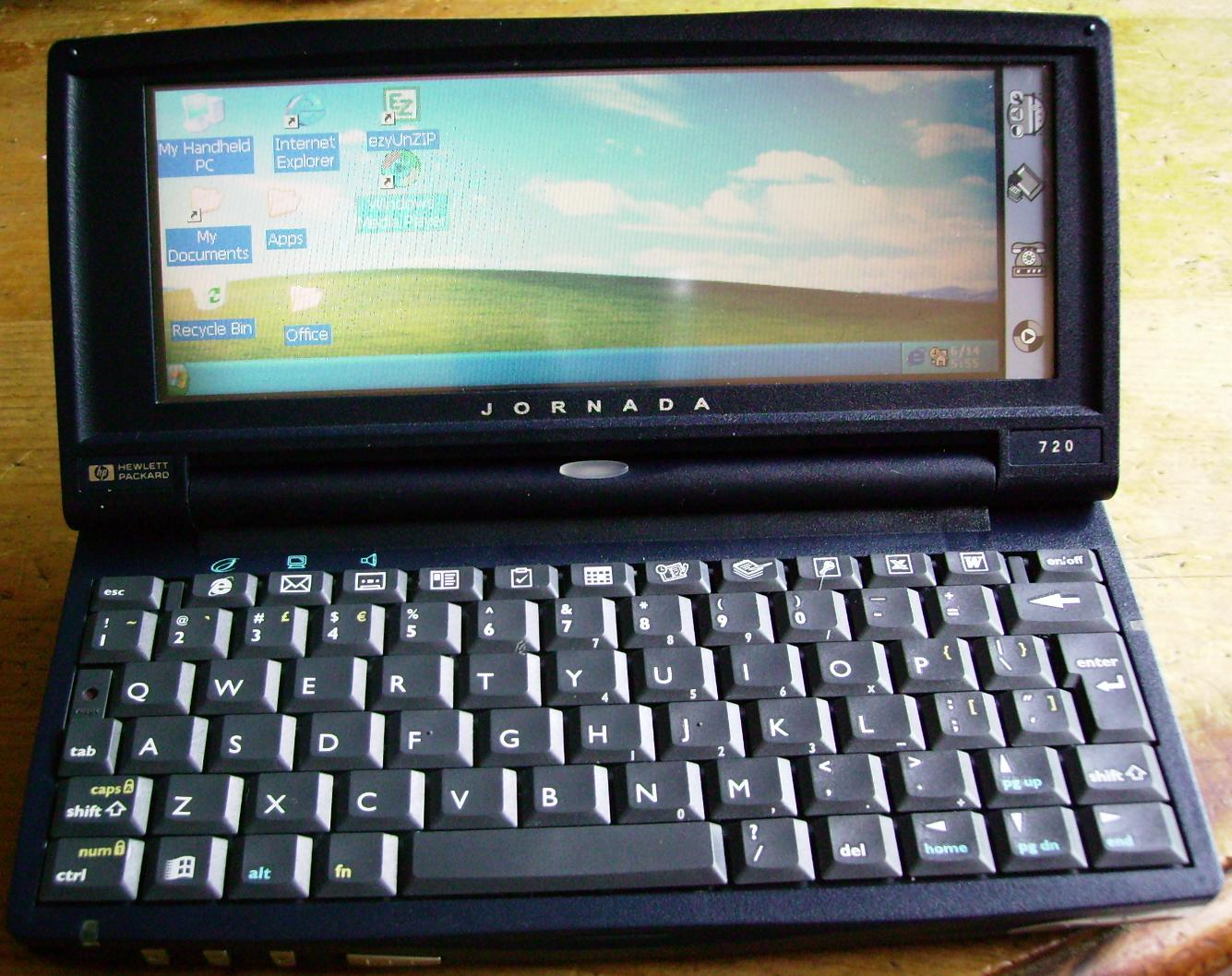
A HP Jornada 720 Handheld PC using Gigabar and C:Amie's 'XP Bliss (Blue) v1.0' theme to skin the taskbar.

The Jornada 720 was released in 2000. It featured 32 MB of RAM, a Compact Flash slot, a PC card slot, a Smart card slot, 56K Modem, 640x240 16-bit display, a 206 MHz StrongARM CPU, and has 9 hours of battery life. It ran under the Windows CE 3.0 based HPC2000.

==== Jornada 728 ====
The Jornada 728 was released in 2002. It featured 64 MB of RAM, a Compact Flash slot, a PC card slot, a smart card slot, 56K Modem, 640x240 16-bit display, and a 206 MHz StrongARM SA1110 CPU. It runs on the Windows CE 3.0 based Handheld PC 2000 and contains a slightly higher OS revision than the 710 or 720, providing the user with native PPTP VPN functionality. The Jornada 728 contained a slightly higher spec battery package, giving it a 14 hour runtime, and was also cosmetically different from the previous 700 series releases by using light purple and grey tones instead of the monochromatic blue chassis of its predecessors. This was the last Handheld PC produced by HP. There are a number of 728 handhelds in existence with only 32 MB of RAM, but they are otherwise identical in spec to the 64 MB model.

=== Palm-Size PCs ===
==== Jornada 420 ====
The Jornada 420 debuted in 1999. It was notable for being the first Palm-Size PC with a color screen, and ran on Windows CE 2.11. It had a touch-screen, a speaker, and featured full e-mail capabilities.

==== Jornada 430/430se ====
Also produced in 1999.

The se model came with free earphones and a clip case.

James Bond sported a HP Jornada 430se in the 1999 film The World Is Not Enough. For a limited period of time, consumers could purchase the 430se and receive with the device a collectible Bond keychain and a coupon for three free Bond movies.

=== Pocket PCs ===
==== Jornada 520 series ====
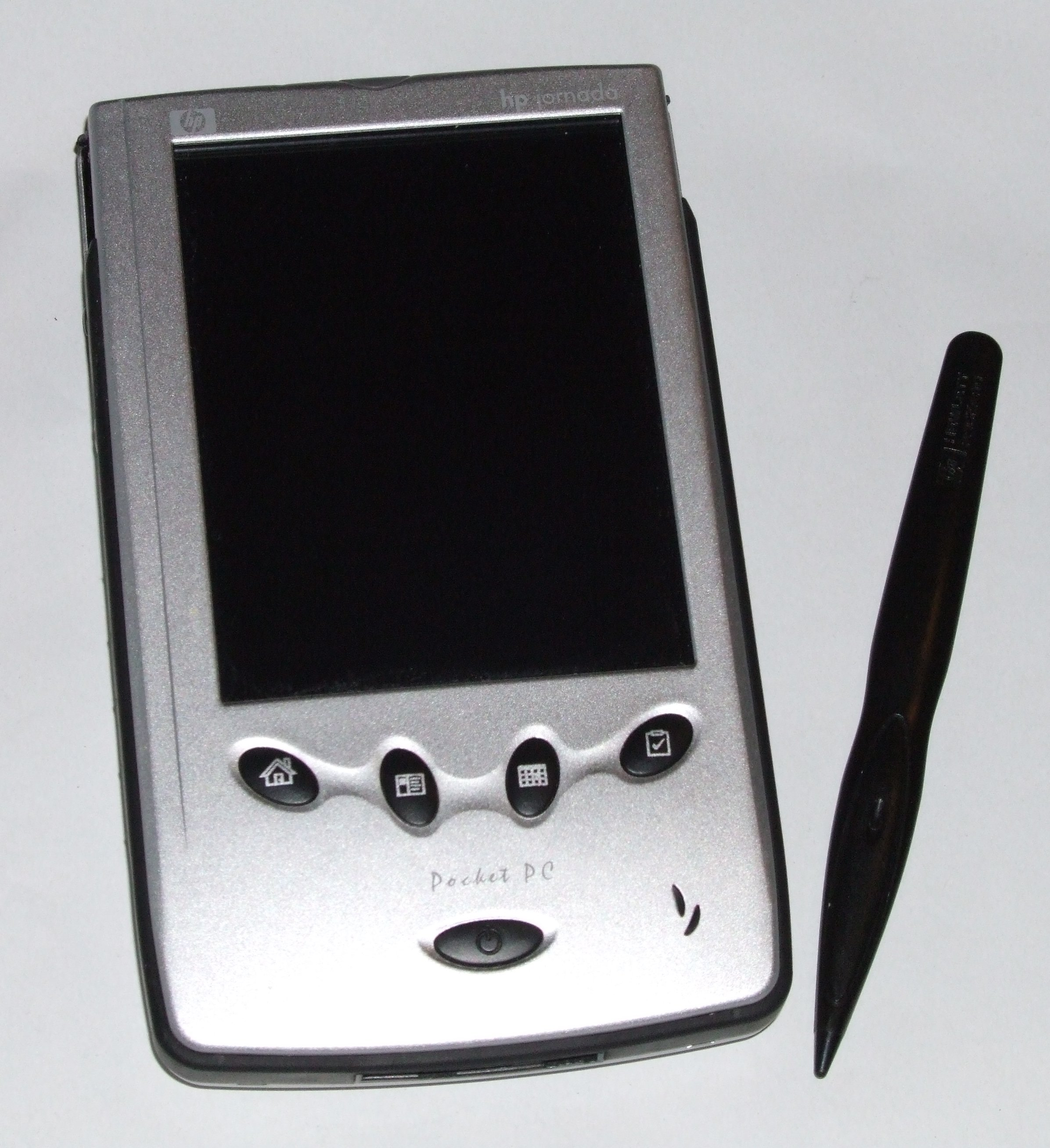
Hp Jornada 520

The Jornada 520 series was HP's answer to an affordable Pocket PC, and could be described as a stripped down version of the 540 series. It featured 16 MB of RAM, a Type I CompactFlash slot, a 256 color screen, and a 133 MHz SH3 processor. It ran the Pocket PC 2000 operating system. The 520 allowed for an optional flip cover like the 540 models, but was only capable of supporting a serial cable for synchronization. The Jornada 520 series had the same form factor as the 540, but was silver.

==== Jornada 540 series ====
The Jornada 540 series was one of the original models of Pocket PC, when the platform was first announced. Sharing the Operating System, CPU and memory card slot of the 520 series, it featured a 12-bit display (originally advertised as 16-bit display) and USB connectivity. Two models were made available that were identical except for the amount of RAM. The 545 had 16 MB RAM and the 548 had 32 MB RAM.

==== Jornada 560 series ====
The Jornada 560 series was the first to run on the Pocket PC 2002 operating system and the only Pocket PC Jornada to use the StrongARM processor. It debuted in October 2001, and featured a reflective LCD screen with an ambient light sensor, and had a completely redone form factor. It also featured a flashable ROM that allowed for updates to the operating system. The Windows Mobile 2003 operating system, however, was never released by HP for this model.

=== Phones ===
==== Jornada 928 ====
The Jornada 928 was Hewlett-Packard's sole Pocket PC phone under the Jornada branding and only available in the United Kingdom. It ran on the Pocket PC 2002 Phone Edition operating system, and had 64 MB of RAM with 32 MB flashable ROM. It used a Texas Instruments OMAP 710 processor clocked at 150 MHz. The phone was a European GSM Dual band device capable of accessing GPRS.

=== Integrated solutions ===
HP Labs in Bristol, United Kingdom, used the GPRS Jornada devices initially with the 568 and later the 928 to create some of the first connected solutions and wearable computing in Bristol ranging from interactive tours of the city to instant language translation trials were also conducted by HP senior executives with major clients such as Disney to explore the use of the technologies in business applications.

=== Prototypes ===
Hewlett-Packard's Appliances and Calculators Organization (ACO) in Melbourne, Australia, also worked on the HP Jornada X25 (F1904A) aka "Calypso", a PDA based on a customized Linux version provided by Lineo Australia and Taiwan. It came with a StrongARM 133 MHz processor, 8 MB of flash, 32 MB of RAM, compact flash card expansion port, infra-red connectivity and USB. Similar to the Windows CE-based HP Xpander, which was cancelled in November 2001, the X25 project was cancelled close to release in early 2002 as well. Between 140 and 200 units were manufactured in a pre-production run.

== See also ==
- Handheld PC
- iPAQ
- Linux on the HP Jornada
- List of HP Pocket Computers
- Palm-size PC
- Pocket PC
- Smartphone
- Windows CE
