= List of Microsoft Windows versions =

Original Windows logo from 1985

Current Windows logo (introduced in 2021)

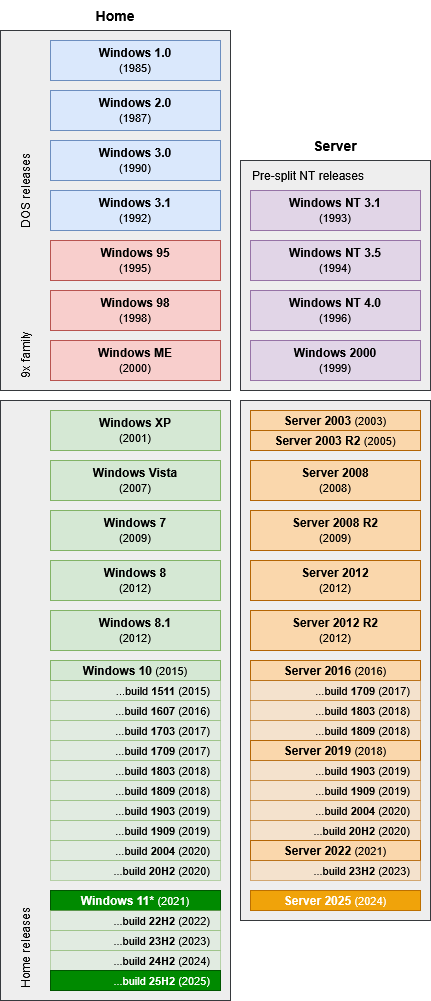
Timeline showing releases of Windows for personal computers and servers

Windows is a computer operating system developed by Microsoft. It was first launched in 1985 as a graphical operating system built on MS-DOS. The initial version was followed by several subsequent releases, and by the early 1990s, the Windows line had split into two separate lines of releases: Windows 9x for consumers and Windows NT for businesses and enterprises. In the following years, several further variants of Windows would be released: Windows CE in 1996 for embedded systems; Pocket PC in 2000 (renamed to Windows Mobile in 2003 and Windows Phone in 2010) for personal digital assistants and, later, smartphones; Windows Holographic in 2016 for AR/VR headsets; and several other editions.

== Personal computer versions ==
A "personal computer" version of Windows is considered to be a version that end-users or OEMs can install on personal computers, including desktop computers, laptops, and workstations.

The first five versions of Windows–Windows 1.0, Windows 2.0, Windows 2.1, Windows 3.0, and Windows 3.1–were all based on MS-DOS, and were aimed at both consumers and businesses. However, Windows 3.1 had two separate successors, splitting the Windows line in two: the consumer-focused "Windows 9x" line, consisting of Windows 95, Windows 98, and Windows Me; and the professional Windows NT line, comprising Windows NT 3.1, Windows NT 3.5, Windows NT 3.51, Windows NT 4.0, and Windows 2000. These two lines were reunited into a single line with the NT-based Windows XP; this Windows release succeeded both Windows Me and Windows 2000 and had separate editions for consumer and professional use. Since Windows XP, multiple further versions of Windows have been released, the most recent of which is Windows 11. Since Windows 10, Microsoft has effectively turned to the "Windows as a service" servicing model, most likely to ensure it competes with mobile operating systems.

List of Microsoft Windows versions for personal computers
Name	Codename	Release date	Version	Editions	Build number	Architecture	End of support
Windows 1.01	Interface Manager	November 20, 1985	1.01	—N/a	—N/a	x86-16	December 31, 2001
Windows 1.02	—N/a	May 14, 1986	1.02	—N/a	—N/a	x86-16	December 31, 2001
Windows 1.03	—N/a	August 21, 1986	1.03	—N/a	—N/a	x86-16	December 31, 2001
Windows 1.04	—N/a	April 10, 1987	1.04	—N/a	—N/a	x86-16	December 31, 2001
Windows 2.01	—N/a	December 9, 1987	2.01	—N/a	—N/a	x86-16, IA-32	December 31, 2001
Windows 2.03	—N/a	December 9, 1987	2.03	—N/a	—N/a	x86-16, IA-32	December 31, 2001
Windows 2.1	—N/a	May 27, 1988	2.10	—N/a	—N/a	x86-16, IA-32	December 31, 2001
Windows 2.11	—N/a	March 13, 1989	2.11	—N/a	—N/a	x86-16, IA-32	December 31, 2001
Windows 3.0	—N/a	May 22, 1990	3.00	Windows 3.00a; Windows 3.0 with Multimedia Extensions	—N/a	x86-16, IA-32	December 31, 2001
Windows 3.1	Janus	April 6, 1992	3.10	Windows 3.1	103	x86-16, IA-32	December 31, 2001
Windows 3.1	Sparta (Note: Originally codenamed Winball)	October 31, 1992	3.10	Windows for Workgroups 3.1	102	IA-32	December 31, 2001
Windows NT 3.1	Razzle	July 27, 1993	NT 3.1	Windows NT 3.1	528	IA-32, Alpha, MIPS	December 31, 2000
Windows 3.11	—N/a	November 8, 1993	3.11	Windows 3.11	002	x86-16, IA-32	December 31, 2001
Windows 3.11	Snowball	November 8, 1993	3.11	Windows for Workgroups 3.11	300	IA-32	December 31, 2001
Windows 3.2	—N/a	November 22, 1993	3.2	Windows 3.2	153	x86-16, IA-32	December 31, 2001
Windows NT 3.5	Daytona	September 21, 1994	NT 3.5	Windows NT 3.5 Workstation	807	IA-32, Alpha, MIPS, PowerPC	December 31, 2001
Windows NT 3.51	Daytona	May 30, 1995	NT 3.51	Windows NT 3.51 Workstation	1057	IA-32, Alpha, MIPS, PowerPC	December 31, 2001
Windows 95	Chicago	August 24, 1995	4.00	Windows 95	950	IA-32	December 31, 2001
Windows NT 4.0	Shell Update Release	August 24, 1996	NT 4.0	Windows NT 4.0 Workstation	1381	IA-32, Alpha, MIPS, PowerPC	June 30, 2004
Windows 98	Memphis (Note: Has also been called ChiCairo and London.)	June 25, 1998	4.10	Windows 98	1998	IA-32	July 11, 2006
Windows 98 Second Edition	—N/a	June 10, 1999	4.10	Windows 98 Second Edition	2222A	IA-32	July 11, 2006
Windows 2000	Windows NT 5.0	February 17, 2000	NT 5.0	Windows 2000 Professional	2195	IA-32	July 13, 2010
Windows Me	Millennium	September 14, 2000	4.90	Windows Me	3000	IA-32	July 11, 2006
Windows XP	Whistler	October 25, 2001	NT 5.1	Windows XP Starter; Windows XP Home; Windows XP Professional	2600	IA-32	April 8, 2014
Windows XP	Whistler	October 25, 2001	NT 5.1	Windows XP 64-bit Edition	2600	Itanium	April 8, 2014
Windows XP	Freestyle	October 29, 2002	NT 5.1	Windows XP Media Center Edition	2600	IA-32	April 8, 2014
Windows XP	Harmony	September 30, 2003	NT 5.1	Windows XP Media Center Edition 2004	2600	IA-32	April 8, 2014
Windows XP	Symphony	October 12, 2004	NT 5.1	Windows XP Media Center Edition 2005	2700	IA-32	April 8, 2014
Windows XP	Emerald	October 14, 2005	NT 5.1	Windows XP Media Center Edition 2005 Update Rollup 2	2710	IA-32	April 8, 2014
Windows XP	Anvil	April 25, 2005	NT 5.2	Windows XP Professional x64 Edition	3790	x86-64	April 8, 2014
Windows Vista	Longhorn	January 30, 2007	NT 6.0	Windows Vista Starter; Windows Vista Home Basic; Windows Vista Home Premium; Windows Vista Business; Windows Vista Enterprise; Windows Vista Ultimate	6002 (Note: Windows Vista and Windows Server 2008 originally had the build number 6000 when they were first released; the build number was increased by one with each of the two subsequent Service Packs.)	IA-32, x86-64	April 11, 2017
Windows 7	Windows 7	October 22, 2009	NT 6.1	Windows 7 Starter; Windows 7 Home Basic; Windows 7 Home Premium; Windows 7 Professional; Windows 7 Enterprise; Windows 7 Ultimate	7601 (Note: Windows 7 and Windows Server 2008 R2 originally had the build number 7600 when they were first released; the build number was increased to 7601 with the release of Service Pack 1.)	IA-32, x86-64	January 14, 2020
Windows 8	Windows 8	October 26, 2012	NT 6.2	Windows 8; Windows 8 Pro; Windows 8 Enterprise	9200	IA-32, x86-64	January 12, 2016
Windows 8.1	Blue	October 17, 2013	NT 6.3	Windows 8.1; Windows 8.1 Pro; Windows 8.1 Enterprise	9600	IA-32, x86-64	January 10, 2023
Windows 8.1	Blue	May 23, 2014 (Note: Announcement date)	NT 6.3	Windows 8.1 with Bing	9600	IA-32, x86-64	January 10, 2023
Windows 10 version 1507	Threshold (Note: Retroactively referred to as Threshold 1)	July 29, 2015	NT 10.0 (Note: Retroactively referred to as version 1507)	Windows 10 Home; Windows 10 Pro; Windows 10 Education; Windows 10 Enterprise; Windows 10 Pro for Workstations; Windows 10 Pro Education; Windows 10 S; Windows 10 Enterprise LTSC; Windows 10 IoT; Windows 10 IoT Enterprise; Windows 10 PE (Preinstallation Environment)	10240	IA-32, x86-64	May 9, 2017
Windows 10 version 1511	Threshold 2	November 10, 2015	1511	Windows 10 Home; Windows 10 Pro; Windows 10 Education; Windows 10 Enterprise; Windows 10 Pro for Workstations; Windows 10 Pro Education; Windows 10 S; Windows 10 Enterprise LTSC; Windows 10 IoT; Windows 10 IoT Enterprise; Windows 10 PE (Preinstallation Environment)	10586	IA-32, x86-64	October 10, 2017
Windows 10 version 1607	Redstone 1	August 2, 2016	1607	Windows 10 Home; Windows 10 Pro; Windows 10 Education; Windows 10 Enterprise; Windows 10 Pro for Workstations; Windows 10 Pro Education; Windows 10 S; Windows 10 Enterprise LTSC; Windows 10 IoT; Windows 10 IoT Enterprise; Windows 10 PE (Preinstallation Environment)	14393	IA-32, x86-64	April 10, 2018
Windows 10 version 1703	Redstone 2	April 5, 2017	1703	Windows 10 Home; Windows 10 Pro; Windows 10 Education; Windows 10 Enterprise; Windows 10 Pro for Workstations; Windows 10 Pro Education; Windows 10 S; Windows 10 Enterprise LTSC; Windows 10 IoT; Windows 10 IoT Enterprise; Windows 10 PE (Preinstallation Environment)	15063	IA-32, x86-64	October 9, 2018
Windows 10 version 1709	Redstone 3	October 17, 2017	1709	Windows 10 Home; Windows 10 Pro; Windows 10 Education; Windows 10 Enterprise; Windows 10 Pro for Workstations; Windows 10 Pro Education; Windows 10 S; Windows 10 Enterprise LTSC; Windows 10 IoT; Windows 10 IoT Enterprise; Windows 10 PE (Preinstallation Environment)	16299	IA-32, x86-64, ARM64	April 9, 2019
Windows 10 version 1803	Redstone 4	April 30, 2018	1803	Windows 10 Home; Windows 10 Pro; Windows 10 Education; Windows 10 Enterprise; Windows 10 Pro for Workstations; Windows 10 Pro Education; Windows 10 S; Windows 10 Enterprise LTSC; Windows 10 IoT; Windows 10 IoT Enterprise; Windows 10 PE (Preinstallation Environment)	17134	IA-32, x86-64, ARM64	November 12, 2019
Windows 10 version 1809	Redstone 5	November 13, 2018	1809	Windows 10 Home; Windows 10 Pro; Windows 10 Education; Windows 10 Enterprise; Windows 10 Pro for Workstations; Windows 10 Pro Education; Windows 10 S; Windows 10 Enterprise LTSC; Windows 10 IoT; Windows 10 IoT Enterprise; Windows 10 PE (Preinstallation Environment)	17763	IA-32, x86-64, ARM64	November 10, 2020
Windows 10 version 1903	19H1	May 21, 2019	1903	Windows 10 Home; Windows 10 Pro; Windows 10 Education; Windows 10 Enterprise; Windows 10 Pro for Workstations; Windows 10 Pro Education; Windows 10 S; Windows 10 Enterprise LTSC; Windows 10 IoT; Windows 10 IoT Enterprise; Windows 10 PE (Preinstallation Environment)	18362	IA-32, x86-64, ARM64	December 8, 2020
Windows 10 version 1909	Vanadium	November 12, 2019	1909	Windows 10 Home; Windows 10 Pro; Windows 10 Education; Windows 10 Enterprise; Windows 10 Pro for Workstations; Windows 10 Pro Education; Windows 10 S; Windows 10 Enterprise LTSC; Windows 10 IoT; Windows 10 IoT Enterprise; Windows 10 PE (Preinstallation Environment)	18363	IA-32, x86-64, ARM64	May 11, 2021
Windows 10 version 2004	Vibranium	May 27, 2020	2004	Windows 10 Home; Windows 10 Pro; Windows 10 Education; Windows 10 Enterprise; Windows 10 Pro for Workstations; Windows 10 Pro Education; Windows 10 S; Windows 10 Enterprise LTSC; Windows 10 IoT; Windows 10 IoT Enterprise; Windows 10 PE (Preinstallation Environment)	19041	IA-32, x86-64, ARM64	December 14, 2021
Windows 10 version 20H2	Vibranium	October 20, 2020	20H2	Windows 10 Home; Windows 10 Pro; Windows 10 Education; Windows 10 Enterprise; Windows 10 Pro for Workstations; Windows 10 Pro Education; Windows 10 S; Windows 10 Enterprise LTSC; Windows 10 IoT; Windows 10 IoT Enterprise; Windows 10 PE (Preinstallation Environment)	19042	IA-32, x86-64, ARM64	August 9, 2022
Windows 10 version 21H1	Vibranium	May 18, 2021	21H1	Windows 10 Home; Windows 10 Pro; Windows 10 Education; Windows 10 Enterprise; Windows 10 Pro for Workstations; Windows 10 Pro Education; Windows 10 S; Windows 10 Enterprise LTSC; Windows 10 IoT; Windows 10 IoT Enterprise; Windows 10 PE (Preinstallation Environment)	19043	IA-32, x86-64, ARM64	December 13, 2022
Windows 10 version 21H2	Vibranium	November 16, 2021	21H2	Windows 10 Home; Windows 10 Pro; Windows 10 Education; Windows 10 Enterprise; Windows 10 Pro for Workstations; Windows 10 Pro Education; Windows 10 S; Windows 10 Enterprise LTSC; Windows 10 IoT; Windows 10 IoT Enterprise; Windows 10 PE (Preinstallation Environment)	19044	IA-32, x86-64, ARM64	June 13, 2023
Windows 10 version 22H2	Vibranium	October 18, 2022	22H2	Windows 10 Home; Windows 10 Pro; Windows 10 Education; Windows 10 Enterprise; Windows 10 Pro for Workstations; Windows 10 Pro Education; Windows 10 S; Windows 10 Enterprise LTSC; Windows 10 IoT; Windows 10 IoT Enterprise; Windows 10 PE (Preinstallation Environment)	19045	IA-32, x86-64, ARM64	October 14, 2025
Windows 11 version 21H2	Cobalt (Note: The core of Windows 11 version 21H2 is codenamed Cobalt; the "Sun Valley" codename refers to the UI layer of Windows 11 version 21H2 and is commonly used to address Windows 11 version 21H2 as a whole.)	October 4, 2021	21H2	Windows 11 Home; Windows 11 Pro; Windows 11 Pro for Workstations; Windows 11 Pro Education; Windows 11 Education; Windows 11 Enterprise; Windows 11 SE; Windows 11 Pro N; Windows 11 IoT Enterprise; Windows 11 PE (Preinstallation Environment)	22000	x86-64, ARM64	October 10, 2023 (Note: The end-of-support date listed in the table refers to Home and Pro editions. Specific versions and editions of Windows 11 have different end of support dates; see template:Windows 11 versions for a breakdown of dates by version and edition.)
Windows 11 version 22H2	Nickel (Note: The core of Windows 11 version 22h2 is codenamed Nickel; the "Sun Valley 2" codename refers to the UI layer of Windows 11 version 22H2.)	September 20, 2022	22H2	Windows 11 Home; Windows 11 Pro; Windows 11 Pro for Workstations; Windows 11 Pro Education; Windows 11 Education; Windows 11 Enterprise; Windows 11 SE; Windows 11 Pro N; Windows 11 IoT Enterprise; Windows 11 PE (Preinstallation Environment)	22621	x86-64, ARM64	October 8, 2024
Windows 11 version 23H2	Nickel	October 31, 2023	23H2	Windows 11 Home; Windows 11 Pro; Windows 11 Pro for Workstations; Windows 11 Pro Education; Windows 11 Education; Windows 11 Enterprise; Windows 11 SE; Windows 11 Pro N; Windows 11 IoT Enterprise; Windows 11 PE (Preinstallation Environment)	22631	x86-64, ARM64	November 11, 2025
Windows 11 version 24H2	Germanium	October 1, 2024	24H2	Windows 11 Home; Windows 11 Pro; Windows 11 Pro for Workstations; Windows 11 Pro Education; Windows 11 Education; Windows 11 Enterprise; Windows 11 SE; Windows 11 Pro N; Windows 11 IoT Enterprise; Windows 11 PE (Preinstallation Environment)	26100	x86-64, ARM64	October 13, 2026
Windows 11 version 25H2	Germanium	September 30, 2025	25H2	Windows 11 Home; Windows 11 Pro; Windows 11 Pro for Workstations; Windows 11 Pro Education; Windows 11 Education; Windows 11 Enterprise; Windows 11 SE; Windows 11 Pro N; Windows 11 IoT Enterprise; Windows 11 PE (Preinstallation Environment)	26200	x86-64, ARM64	October 12, 2027
Windows 11 version 26H1	Bromine	February 10, 2026	26H1	Windows 11 Home; Windows 11 Pro; Windows 11 Pro for Workstations; Windows 11 Pro Education; Windows 11 Education; Windows 11 Enterprise; Windows 11 SE; Windows 11 Pro N; Windows 11 IoT Enterprise; Windows 11 PE (Preinstallation Environment)	28000	x86-64, ARM64	March 14, 2028
Windows 11, version 26H2	Germanium	September 29, 2026	26H2	Windows 11 Home; Windows 11 Pro; Windows 11 Pro for Workstations; Windows 11 Pro Education; Windows 11 Education; Windows 11 Enterprise; Windows 11 SE; Windows 11 Pro N; Windows 11 IoT Enterprise; Windows 11 PE (Preinstallation Environment)	26300	x86-64, ARM64	TBA

== Mobile versions ==
Mobile versions refer to versions of Windows that can run on smartphones or personal digital assistants.

Pocket PC 2000 logo

Logo used for Windows Phone 7.5 and Windows Phone 7.8

Logo used for Windows Phone 8 and Windows Phone 8.1

Logo used for Windows 10 and Windows 10 Mobile

Name	Codename	Architecture	Release date	Version number
Pocket PC 2000	Rapier	ARMv4, MIPS, SH-3	April 19, 2000	CE 3.0
Pocket PC 2002	Merlin	ARMv4	October 4, 2001	CE 3.0
Windows Mobile 2003	Ozone	ARMv5	June 23, 2003	CE 4.x
Windows Mobile 2003 SE	Ozone	ARMv5	March 24, 2004	CE 4.x
Windows Mobile 5.0	Magneto	ARMv5	May 9, 2005	CE 5.0
Windows Mobile 6.0	Crossbow	ARMv5	February 12, 2007	CE 5.0
Windows Mobile 6.1	Crossbow	ARMv5	April 1, 2008	CE 5.2
Windows Mobile 6.1.4	6 on 6	ARMv5	November 11, 2008	CE 5.2
Windows Mobile 6.5	Titanium	ARMv5	May 11, 2009	CE 6.0
Windows Phone 7 (Note: Originally named "Windows Phone 7 Series")	Metro	ARMv7	October 29, 2010	CE 6.0
Windows Phone 7.5	Mango	ARMv7	September 27, 2011	CE 6.0
Windows Phone 7.8	Tango	ARMv7	February 1, 2013	CE 6.0
Windows Phone 8	Apollo	ARMv7	October 29, 2012	NT 6.2
Windows Phone 8.1	Blue	ARMv7	April 14, 2014	NT 6.3
Windows 10 Mobile, version 1511	Threshold 2	ARMv7	November 12, 2015	1511
Windows 10 Mobile, version 1607	Redstone 1	ARMv7	August 16, 2016	1607
Windows 10 Mobile, version 1703	Redstone 2	ARMv7	April 24, 2017	1703
Windows 10 Mobile, version 1709	feature2	ARMv7	October 24, 2017	1709

== Server versions ==
Name	Codename	Release date	Version number	Editions	Build number	Architecture	End of support
Windows NT 3.1	Razzle	July 27, 1993	NT 3.1	Windows NT 3.1 Advanced Server	528	IA-32, Alpha, MIPS	December 31, 2000
Windows NT 3.5	Daytona	September 21, 1994	NT 3.5	Windows NT 3.5 Server	807	IA-32, Alpha, MIPS, PowerPC	December 31, 2001
Windows NT 3.51	Daytona	May 29, 1995	NT 3.51	Windows NT 3.51 Server	1057	IA-32, Alpha, MIPS, PowerPC	September 30, 2002
Windows NT 4.0	Shell Update Release	July 29, 1996	NT 4.0	Windows NT 4.0 Server; Windows NT 4.0 Server Enterprise; Windows NT 4.0 Terminal Server Edition	1381	IA-32, Alpha, MIPS, PowerPC	December 31, 2004
Windows 2000	NT 5.0	February 17, 2000	NT 5.0	Windows 2000 Server; Windows 2000 Advanced Server; Windows 2000 Datacenter Server	2195	IA-32	July 13, 2010
Windows Server 2003	Whistler Server	April 24, 2003	NT 5.2	Windows Server Web; Windows Server Standard; Windows Server Enterprise; Windows Server Datacenter; Windows Storage Server; Windows Unified Data Storage Server	3790	IA-32, x86-64, Itanium	July 14, 2015
Windows Server 2003 R2	Whistler Server	March 5, 2006	NT 5.2	Windows Server Web; Windows Server Standard; Windows Server Enterprise; Windows Server Datacenter; Windows Storage Server; Windows Unified Data Storage Server	3790	IA-32, x86-64, Itanium	July 14, 2015
Windows Server 2008	Longhorn Server	February 27, 2008	NT 6.0	Windows Server Foundation; Windows Server Standard; Windows Server Enterprise; Windows Server Datacenter; Windows Server for Itanium-based Systems; Windows Storage Server; Windows Web Server	6003	IA-32, x86-64, Itanium	January 14, 2020
Windows Server 2008 R2	Windows Server 7	October 22, 2009	NT 6.1	Windows Server Foundation; Windows Server Standard; Windows Server Enterprise; Windows Server Datacenter; Windows Server for Itanium-based Systems; Windows Storage Server; Windows Web Server	7601	x86-64, Itanium	January 14, 2020
Windows Server 2012	Windows Server 8	September 4, 2012	NT 6.2	Windows Server Foundation; Windows Server Essentials; Windows Server Standard; Windows Server Datacenter	9200	x86-64	October 10, 2023
Windows Server 2012 R2	Windows Server Blue	October 17, 2013	NT 6.3	Windows Server Foundation; Windows Server Essentials; Windows Server Standard; Windows Server Datacenter	9600	x86-64	October 10, 2023
Windows Server 2016	Redstone	October 12, 2016	1607	Windows Server Essentials (Note: Between versions 1709 and 20H2 of Windows Server, the "Windows Server Essentials" edition of Windows Server was only included in Windows Server 2019.); Windows Server Standard; Windows Server Datacenter	14393	x86-64	January 12, 2027
Windows Server, version 1709	Redstone 3	October 17, 2017	1709	Windows Server Essentials; Windows Server Standard; Windows Server Datacenter	16299	x86-64	April 9, 2019
Windows Server, version 1803	Redstone 4	April 30, 2018	1803	Windows Server Essentials; Windows Server Standard; Windows Server Datacenter	17134	x86-64	November 12, 2019
Windows Server, version 1809	Redstone 5	November 13, 2018	1809	Windows Server Essentials; Windows Server Standard; Windows Server Datacenter	17763	x86-64	November 10, 2020
Windows Server 2019	Redstone 5	November 13, 2018	1809	Windows Server Essentials; Windows Server Standard; Windows Server Datacenter	17763	x86-64	January 9, 2029
Windows Server, version 1903	Redstone 5	May 21, 2019	1903	Windows Server Essentials; Windows Server Standard; Windows Server Datacenter	18362	x86-64	December 8, 2020
Windows Server, version 1909	Vanadium	November 12, 2019	1909	Windows Server Essentials; Windows Server Standard; Windows Server Datacenter	18363	x86-64	May 11, 2021
Windows Server, version 2004	Vibranium	June 26, 2020	2004	Windows Server Essentials; Windows Server Standard; Windows Server Datacenter	19041	x86-64	December 14, 2021
Windows Server, version 20H2	Iron	October 20, 2020	20H2	Windows Server Essentials; Windows Server Standard; Windows Server Datacenter	19042	x86-64	August 9, 2022
Windows Server 2022	Iron	August 18, 2021	21H2	Windows Server Essentials; Windows Server Standard; Windows Server Datacenter	20348	x86-64	October 14, 2031
Windows Server, version 23H2	Zinc	October 14, 2023	23H2	Windows Server Essentials; Windows Server Standard; Windows Server Datacenter	25398	AMD64	April 24, 2026 ( azure )
Windows Server 2025	Germanium	November 1, 2024	24H2	Windows Server Essentials; Windows Server Standard; Windows Server Datacenter	26100	AMD64, ARM64	November 14, 2034

=== High-performance computing (HPC) servers ===
Name	Codename	Release date	Based on
Windows Compute Cluster Server 2003	—N/a	June 9, 2006	Windows Server 2003 R2
Windows HPC Server 2008	Socrates	September 22, 2008	Windows Server 2008
Windows HPC Server 2008 R2	—N/a	September 20, 2010	Windows Server 2008 R2

=== Windows Essential Business Server ===
Name	Codename	Release date	End-of-support date	Build number	Based on
Windows Essential Business Server 2008	Centro	September 15, 2008	January 14, 2020	5700	Windows Server 2008

=== Windows Home Server ===
Name	Codename	Release date	End-of-support date	Based on
Windows Home Server	Quattro	November 4, 2007	January 8, 2013	Windows Server 2003 R2
Windows Home Server 2011	Vail	April 6, 2011	April 12, 2016	Windows Server 2008 R2

=== Windows MultiPoint Server ===
Windows MultiPoint Server was an operating system based on Windows Server. It was succeeded by the MultiPoint Services role in Windows Server 2016 and Windows Server version 1709. It was no longer being developed in Windows Server version 1803 and later versions.

Name	Codename	Release date	End-of-support date	Version number	Build number	Based on
Windows MultiPoint Server 2010	Solution Server	February 24, 2010	July 14, 2020	NT 6.1	537	Windows Server 2008 R2
Windows MultiPoint Server 2011	WMS 2	May 12, 2011	July 13, 2021	NT 6.1	1600	Windows Server 2008 R2 Service Pack 1
Windows MultiPoint Server 2012	WMS 3	October 30, 2012	October 10, 2023	NT 6.2	2506	Windows Server 2012

=== Windows Small Business Server ===
Name	Codename	Release date	End-of-support date	Build number	Based on
Small Business Server 2000	—N/a	February 21, 2001	July 13, 2010	1343	Windows 2000 Server
Windows Small Business Server 2003	Bobcat	October 9, 2003	July 14, 2015	2893	Windows Server 2003
Windows Small Business Server 2008	Cougar	August 21, 2008	January 14, 2020	5601	Windows Server 2008
Windows Small Business Server 2011 Standard	Windows Small Business Server 7	December 13, 2010	January 14, 2020	7900	Windows Server 2008 R2
Windows Small Business Server 2011 Essentials	Colorado	June 28, 2011	January 5, 2013	8800	Windows Server 2008 R2

== Device versions ==
=== ARM-based tablets ===
Windows RT logo

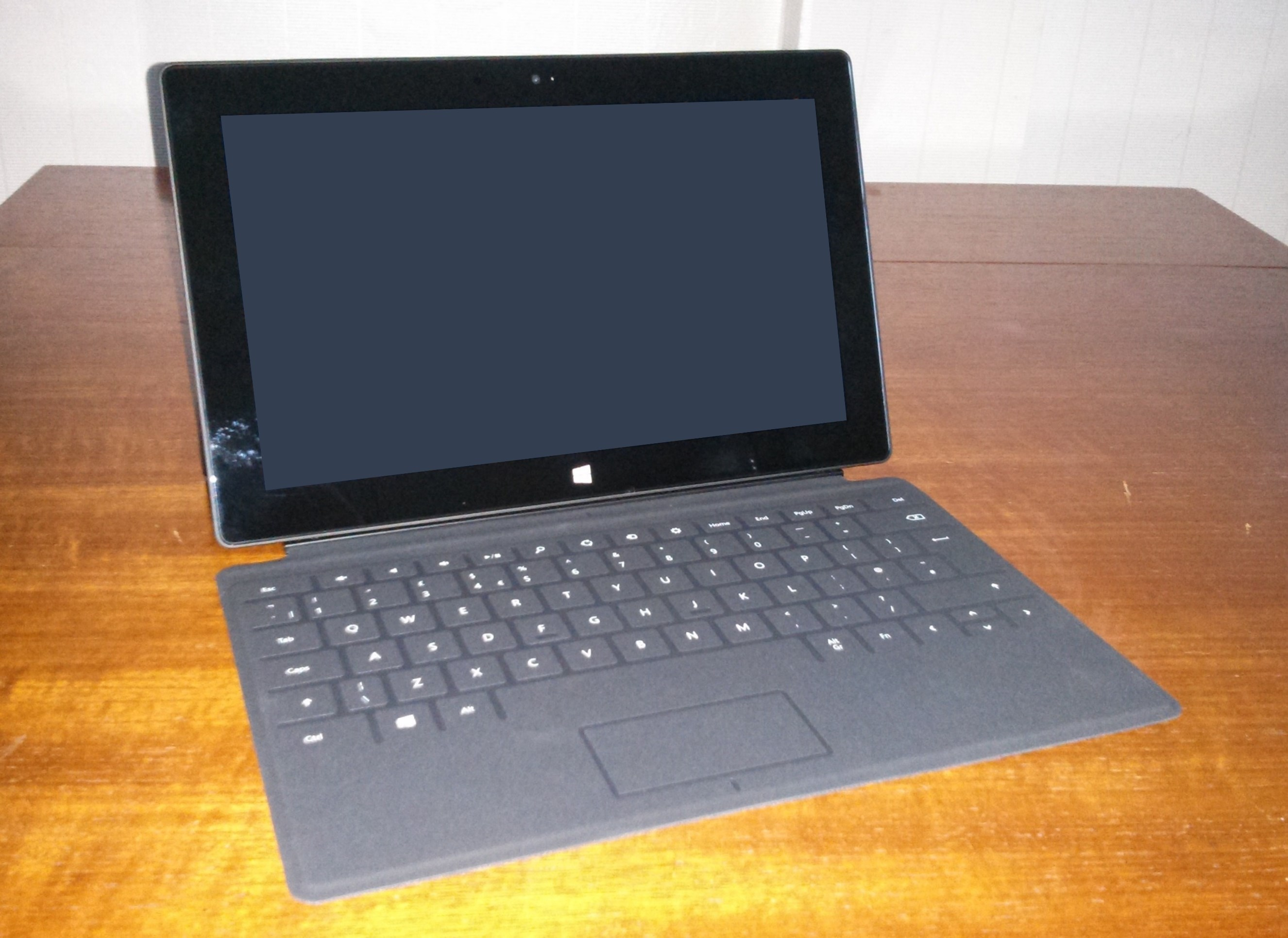
The Surface RT (shown with keyboard cover attached) was the flagship Windows RT device upon its release.

In 2012 and 2013, Microsoft released versions of Windows specially designed to run on ARM-based tablets; these versions of Windows, named "Windows RT" and "Windows RT 8.1," were based on Windows 8 and Windows 8.1, respectively. Upon the release of Windows 10 in 2015, the ARM-specific version for large tablets was discontinued; large tablets (such as the Surface Pro 4) were only released with x86 processors and could run the full version of Windows 10. Windows 10 Mobile had the ability to be installed on smaller tablets (up to nine inches); however, very few such tablets were released, and Windows 10 Mobile primarily ended up only running on smartphones until its discontinuation. In 2017, the full version of Windows 10 gained the ability to run on ARM, thus rendering a specific version of Windows for ARM-based tablets unnecessary.

Name	Release date	Version number	Build number	Based on
Windows RT	October 26, 2012	NT 6.2	9200	Windows 8
Windows RT 8.1	October 18, 2013	NT 6.3	9600	Windows 8.1

=== Mixed reality and virtual reality headsets ===
Name	Build number
Windows 10 Holographic, version 1607	14393
Windows 10 Holographic, version 1803	17134
Windows 10 Holographic, version 1809	17763
Windows Holographic, version 1903	18362
Windows Holographic, version 2004	19041
Windows Holographic, version 20H2	19041
Windows Holographic, version 21H1	20346
Windows Holographic, version 21H2	20348
Windows Holographic, version 22H1	20348

=== Surface Hub ===
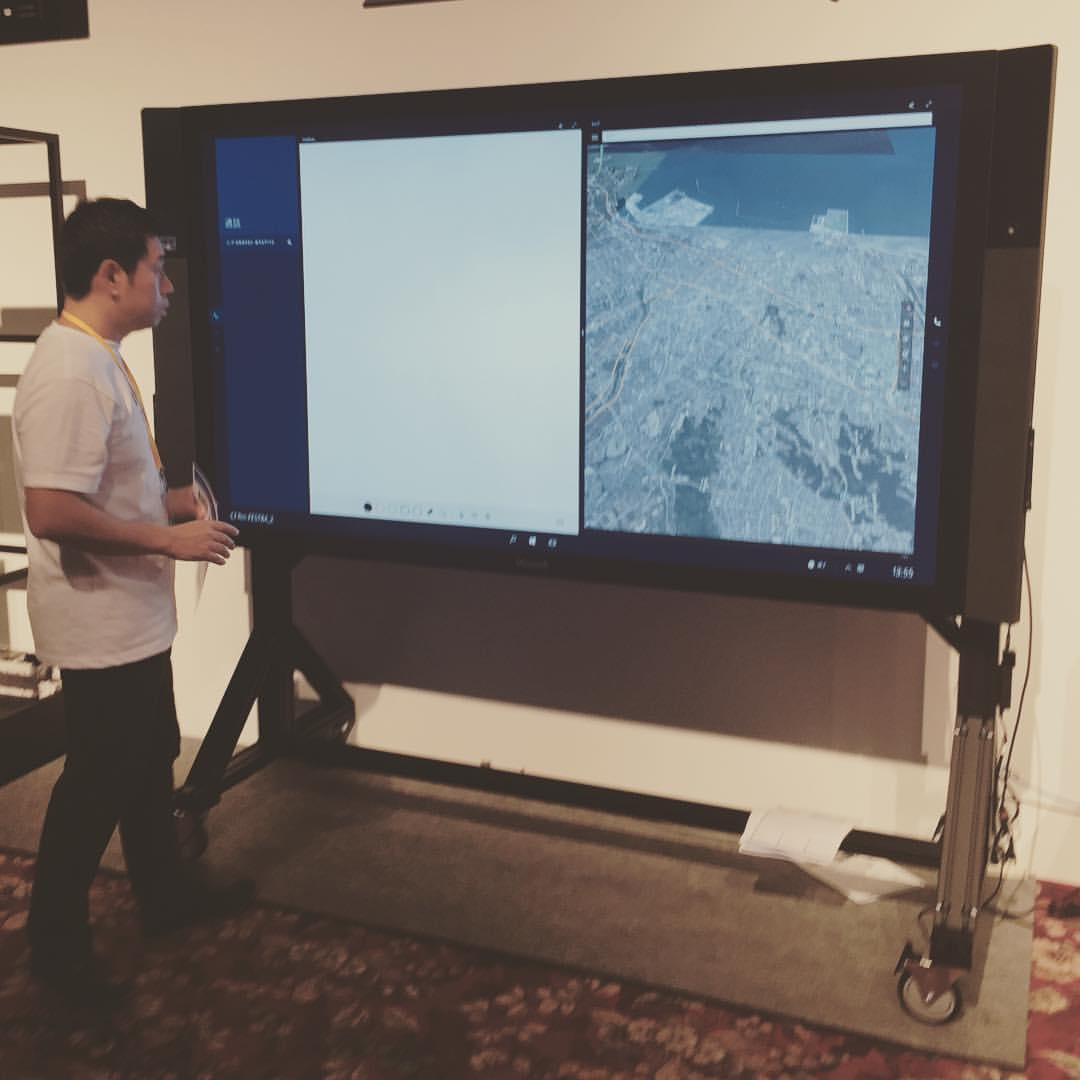
Surface Hub

Microsoft originally announced the Surface Hub, an interactive whiteboard, in January 2015. The Surface Hub family of devices runs a custom variant of Windows 10 known as Windows 10 Team.

Name	Build number
Windows 10 Team, version 1511	10586
Windows 10 Team, version 1607	14393
Windows 10 Team, version 1703	15063
Windows 10 Team, version 20H2	19042

=== Windows XP-based tablets ===
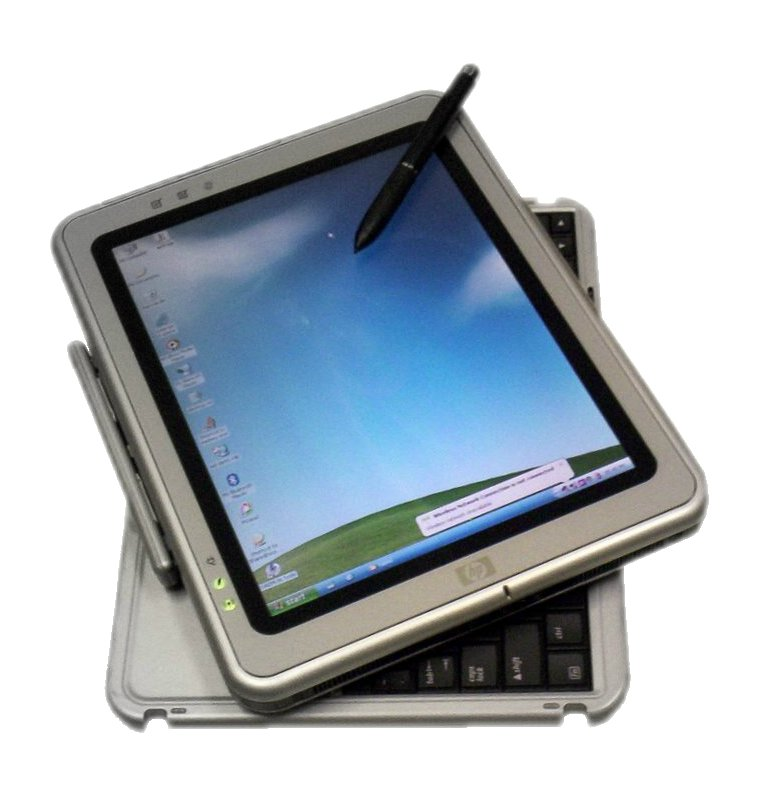
Tablet computer running a "Tablet PC Edition" of Windows XP

Two versions of Windows XP were released that were optimized for tablets. Beginning with Windows Vista, all tablet-specific components were included in the main version of the operating system.

Name	Codename	Release date	Version number	Build number	Based on
Windows XP Tablet PC Edition	—N/a	November 7, 2002	NT 5.1	2600	Windows XP
Windows XP Tablet PC Edition 2005	Lonestar	August 3, 2004	NT 5.1	2600	Windows XP

== Embedded versions ==
=== Windows Embedded Compact ===
Name	Codename(s)	Release date
Windows CE 1.0	Pegasus; Alder	November 16, 1996
Windows CE 2.0	Jupiter; Birch	September 29, 1997
Windows CE 2.1	—N/a	July 1998
Windows CE 2.11	—N/a	October 1998
Windows CE 2.12	—N/a	1999
Windows CE 3.0	Cedar; Galileo	2000
Windows CE 4.0	Talisker	January 7, 2002
Windows CE 4.1	Jameson	July 30, 2002
Windows CE 4.2	McKendric	April 23, 2003
Windows CE 5.0	Macallan	July 9, 2004
Windows Embedded CE 6.0	Yamazaki	November 1, 2006
Windows Embedded Compact 7	Chelan	March 1, 2011
Windows Embedded Compact 2013	—N/a	June 13, 2013

=== Windows Embedded Standard ===
Name	Codename	Release date	Based on
Windows NT Embedded 4.0	Impala	August 30, 1999	Windows NT 4.0 Workstation
Windows XP Embedded	Mantis	November 28, 2001	Windows XP Professional
Windows Embedded Standard 2009	—N/a	December 14, 2008	Windows XP Service Pack 3
Windows Embedded Standard 7	Quebec	2010	Windows 7
Windows Embedded 8	—N/a	2013	Windows 8
Windows Embedded 8.1	—N/a	2013	Windows 8.1

=== Other embedded versions ===
- Windows Embedded Industry
- Windows Embedded Automotive

== Cancelled versions ==
=== Cancelled personal computer versions ===
Codename	Intended name	Discontinuation	Version	Latest known build number	Notes
Cairo	—N/a	1996	NT 4.0	1175	Originally announced at the 1991 Microsoft Professional Developers Conference, Cairo was the codename of a project whose charter was to build technologies for a next-generation operating system that would fulfill Bill Gates's vision of "information at your fingertips". Cairo never shipped, although portions of its technologies have since appeared in other products.
Nashville (Note: Nashville was originally codenamed Cleveland.)	Windows 96	1996	4.1	999	Nashville was an operating system planned to have been released between Windows 95 and Windows 98, presumably under the "Windows 96" moniker.
Neptune	—N/a	Early 2000	NT 5.50	5111	Neptune, based on the Windows 2000 codebase, was planned to be the first version of Microsoft Windows NT to have a consumer edition variant. A version was sent out to testers but was never released. The teams working on Neptune and Odyssey eventually combined to work on Windows XP.
Odyssey	—N/a	Early 2000	NT 6.0	—N/a	Odyssey was planned to be the successor of Windows 2000. The teams working on Neptune and Odyssey eventually combined to work on Windows XP.
Triton	—N/a	Early 2000	—N/a	—N/a	Triton was planned to be the successor of Windows Neptune and had been scheduled to be released in March 2001.
Blackcomb	—N/a	January 2006	—N/a	—N/a	Blackcomb was originally planned to be a release of Windows following Windows XP. However, due to the large feature scope planned for Blackcomb, a smaller release codenamed "Longhorn" was planned first, and Blackcomb was delayed to 2003/2004. Both projects faced delays; Longhorn would go on to be released to consumers as "Windows Vista" in January 2007, while development on Blackcomb continued until the Blackcomb project was renamed "Vienna" in early 2006.
Vienna	—N/a	July 2007 (Note: July 2007 is when it was reported that the Vista's successor was codenamed "7", rather than "Vienna", indicating that Vienna's discontinuation had occurred by then. However, Vienna may have been cancelled prior to then.)	—N/a	—N/a	Vienna replaced Blackcomb and was intended as Windows Vista's successor. Vienna was eventually cancelled in favor of a new project codenamed "Windows 7" (which went on to be released in 2009 with the same name).
Windows Polaris	—N/a	2018	—N/a	16299	Cancelled in favor of Santorini
Santorini (Note: While Santorini was the general codename for Windows 10X, Centaurus was the specific codename for Windows 10X on foldable PCs and Pegasus was the codename for Windows 10X on "traditional" PCs (such as laptops or 2-in-1 computers).)	Windows 10X	May 18, 2021 (Note: Date refers to when the cancellation of the operating system was announced. The decision for the operating system to be cancelled may have occurred prior to then.)	21H1	20279	Microsoft had been reported as working on a new "lite" version of Windows as early as December 2018. Such a version was officially announced under the name "Windows 10X" at an event in October 2019; the operating system was intended to first launch on dual-screen devices. In May 2020, Microsoft announced that Windows 10X would instead be launching on single-screen PCs, such as laptops and 2-in-1 devices, first. However, on May 18, 2021, Microsoft announced that Windows 10X would not be launching (at least not in 2021); many of its features were instead rolled into Windows 11.

=== Cancelled mobile versions ===
Codename	Intended name	Discontinuation	Notes
Photon	Windows Mobile 7	September 2008	Originally a successor of Windows Mobile, it had been scrapped for Windows Phone 7
Phoenix	—N/a	Early 2017	Cancelled when Microsoft "wound down" its phone efforts.
Andromeda	—N/a	Mid-2018	Much of the work that was put into Andromeda was migrated into Santorini. The Surface Duo, a dual-screen Android-powered smartphone launched by Microsoft in 2020, was loosely based on the prototype hardware that had been used to test Andromeda.

=== Cancelled server versions ===
Codename	Intended name	Discontinuation	Latest known build number
Cascades	Windows Essential Business Server 2008 R2	April 7, 2010	7224

== See also ==
- List of Microsoft operating systems
- Microsoft Windows version history
- Windows 10 version history
- Windows 11 version history
- Comparison of Microsoft Windows versions
- List of Microsoft codenames
