= Windows Camera =

Image and video capture software

- Camera in Windows 10 Mobile
- Developer: Microsoft
- Release: November 5, 2014; 12 years ago
- Stable release: August 2026 Update (2026.2608.1) / October 16, 2026; 37 days ago
- Operating system: Windows 10, 11; Xbox system software; Discontinued: Windows 8, 8.1 (2023); Windows 10 Mobile (2020); Windows Phone 8.1 (2017); Windows Phone 8 (2016); Windows Mobile 5.0 (2015); Windows Mobile 2003, Phone 7 (2014); Windows Mobile 6.0, 6.1, 6.5 (2013); Pocket PC 2002 (2008)
- Platform: ARM, x64, x86
- Website: www.microsoft.com/store/productId/9WZDNCRFJBBG

Windows Camera is an image and video capture utility included with the most recent versions of Windows and its mobile counterpart. It has been around on Windows-based mobile devices since camera hardware was included on those devices and was introduced on Windows PCs with Windows 8, providing users for the first time a first-party built-in camera that could interact with webcam hardware. It is similar in structure and features to the iOS and Android Camera apps.

Starting with Windows 10, Windows Camera not only captures photos and videos but also scans QR codes, barcodes, physical documents, and whiteboards.

== Photo capture ==
Camera can capture standard photos, videos, and "living images", which are similar to animated GIF images. It supports 16:9, 4:3, and 3:2 aspect ratios and offers square, rule of thirds, golden ratio, and crosshairs alignment frames, which are disabled by default. Video capture selections can be taken with detail levels of 640 × 360 pixels/30 frames per second, 1280 × 720 pixels/30 frames per second, or 1920 × 1080 pixels/30 frames per second. Flicker reduction and video stabilization can also be enabled.

Photos and videos are saved by default to the Saved Images folder of the Pictures library in File Explorer, but users can change the storage location.

Camera's captures include location information if the user provides the app permission to use it. Additional settings included in the app include time delay, zooming, focus control, sensitivity control, white balance control, shutter speed control, brightness control, and a toggle for switching between different cameras. For instance, most Windows phones and tablets have both front- and rear-facing cameras, so Camera's switch button toggles between the two options.

== Introduction ==
Camera was introduced to Windows Mobile in 2000 and Windows PCs in late 2012. Prior to its introduction, there was no built-in tool for using built-in PC cameras or connected external webcams, although some manufacturers included third-party camera software on devices they sold. On Lumia Windows 10 Mobile devices, it is the only camera as Microsoft discontinued support for the custom Lumia Camera apps.

== Issues ==
Camera does not have some of the features of the iOS app, such as slow-motion videos, a 1:1 photo ratio, and filters. However, all of these effects can still be added to already-created photos and videos by editing them in Photos. Camera does have a panorama capture feature similar to iOS', but only on phones.

Microsoft launched a free camera app named Pix exclusively for iOS devices, despite already having its own mobile platform and Camera app. Pix has a different set of features than either Windows Camera or iOS Camera.

== See also ==
- Microsoft Photos
- Microsoft Sway
- Microsoft Paint
- Imaging for Windows
