= List of Microsoft operating systems =

This is a list of Microsoft written and published operating systems. For the codenames that Microsoft gave their operating systems, see Microsoft codenames. For another list of versions of Microsoft Windows, see, List of Microsoft Windows versions.

== MS-DOS ==
- See MS-DOS Versions for a full list.

== Windows ==
=== Windows 1.0 until 11 ===
Name	Date of release
Windows 1.0	1985-11-20
Windows 2.x	1987-12-09
Windows 3.0	1990-05-22
Windows for Workgroups 3.11	1993-08-11
Windows NT 3.1	1993-10-27
Windows NT 3.5	1994-09-21
Windows NT 3.51	1995-05-30
Windows 95	1995-08-24
Windows NT 4.0	1996-07-31
Windows 98	1998-06-25
Windows 98 SE	1999-05-05
Windows 2000	2000-02-17
Windows Me	2000-09-14
Windows XP	2001-10-25
Windows XP Embedded	2002-01-30
Windows XP Media Center Edition	2002-10-28
Windows XP Tablet PC Edition	2002-11-07
Windows XP 64-bit Edition	2003-03-28
Windows Server 2003	2003-04-24
Windows Small Business Server 2003	2003-10-09
Windows XP Starter	2004-08-11
Windows XP Professional x64 Edition	2005-04-25
Windows Embedded for Point of Service	2005-06-06
Windows Server 2003 R2	2005-12-06
Windows Vista	2007-01-30
Windows Home Server	2007-11-04
Windows Server 2008	2008-02-27
Windows Small Business Server 2008	2008-08-21
Windows Embedded Standard 2009	2008-12-14
Windows Embedded POSReady 2009	2008-12-14
Windows 7	2009-10-22
Windows Server 2008 R2	2009-10-22
Windows Server 2012	2012-09-04
Windows 8	2012-10-26
Windows 8.1	2013-10-17
Windows Server 2012 R2	2013-10-18
Windows CE	
AutoPC	
Pocket PC	
Pocket PC 2000	2000
Pocket PC 2002	2002
Windows 10	2016
Windows 11	2021
Windows Mobile

=== Windows 10/11 and Windows Server 2016/2019/2022/2025 ===
Name	Date of release	Update version
Windows 10	2015-07-29	RTM (10240)
Windows 10 (1511)	2015-11-10	November (1511)
Windows 10 (1607)	2016-08-02	Anniversary (1607)
Windows Server 2016	2016-08-02	Anniversary (1607)
Windows 10 (1703)	2017-04-05	Creators (1703)
Windows 10 (1709)	2017-10-17	Fall Creators (1709)
Windows Server (1709)	2017-10-17	Fall Creators (1709)
Windows 10 (1803)	2018-04-30	April 2018 (1803)
Windows Server (1803)	2018-04-30	April 2018 (1803)
Windows 10 (1809)	2018-11-13	October 2018 (1809)
Windows Server (1809)	2018-11-13	October 2018 (1809)
Windows Server 2019	2018-11-13	October 2018 (1809)
Windows 10 (1903)	2019-05-21	May 2019 (1903)
Windows Server (1903)	2019-05-21	May 2019 (1903)
Windows 10 (1909)	2019-11-12	November 2019 (1909)
Windows Server (1909)	2019-11-12	November 2019 (1909)
Windows 10 (2004)	2020-05-27	May 2020 (2004)
Windows Server (2004)	2020-05-27	May 2020 (2004)
Windows 11 (2021)	2021-10-05	October 2021 (21H2)
Windows Server 2022	2021-08-18	
Windows Server 2025	2024-11-01	

=== Windows Mobile ===
- Windows Mobile 2003
- Windows Mobile 2003 SE
- Windows Mobile 5
- Windows Mobile 6

=== Windows Phone ===
Name	Date of release
Windows Phone 7	2010
Windows Phone 8	2012
Windows Phone 8.1	2014

== Xbox gaming ==
- Xbox system software
- Xbox 360 system software
- Xbox One and Xbox Series X/S system software

== OS/2 ==
Version	Date of release
1	1987
1.1	1988
1.2	1989
1.3	1990

== Unix and Unix-like ==
- Xenix
- Nokia X platform
- Azure Sphere
- SONiC
- Windows Subsystem for Linux
- Azure Sphere OS
- Azure Linux

== Other operating systems ==
- MS-Net
- LAN Manager
- MIDAS
- Singularity
  - Midori
- Zune
- KIN OS
- Nokia Asha platform
- Barrelfish
- Novell Netware (operating system)

== Time line ==
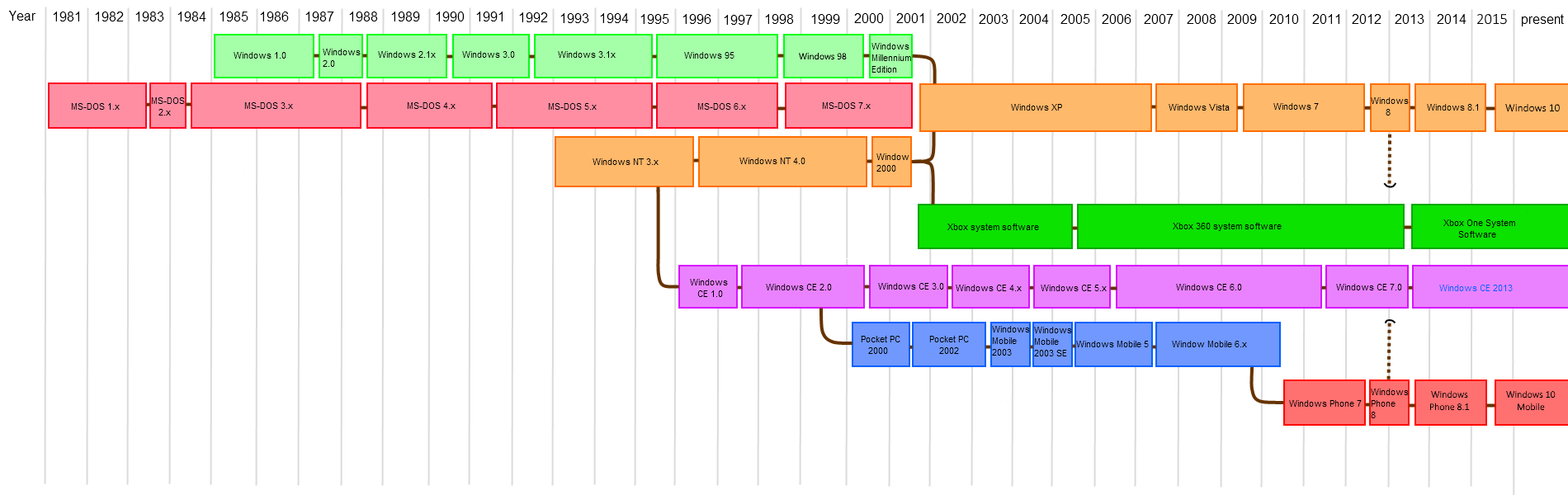
A family tree of operating systems created by Microsoft. This time line is neither complete or comprehensive. For example, Windows Server and Windows Embedded families are left out.

== See also ==
- Microsoft and open source – Relationship between the technology company and the open source software paradigm
- List of Microsoft topics – Overview of and topical guide to Microsoft
- List of operating systems
