= T-Mobile MDA =

Series of smartphone models

T-Mobile MDA (Mobile Digital Assistant) is a series of T-Mobile-branded phones manufactured by HTC Corporation of Taiwan:

European models
Phone	Brand By	of original model
T-Mobile MDA (Europe)	T-Mobile	HTC Wallaby
T-Mobile MDA II	T-Mobile	HTC Himalaya
T-Mobile MDA III	T-Mobile	HTC Blue Angel

United States models
Phone	Brand by	of original model	Availability (HTC)	Operating System
T-Mobile MDA (US)	T-Mobile USA	HTC Wizard 200	2005-10	Windows Mobile 5.0
T-Mobile MDA Ameo	T-Mobile	HTC Athena 100	2003-07	Windows Mobile 5.0 Pocket PC Phone Edition for X7500 (T-Mobile Optional Update to WM6), Windows Mobile 6 Professional for X7501, Windows Mobile 6.1 for X7510
T-Mobile MDA Compact	T-Mobile	HTC Magician	2004-12	Windows Mobile 2003 Second Edition
T-Mobile MDA Compact II	T-Mobile	HTC Charmer	2003-06	Windows Mobile 5
T-Mobile MDA Compact III	T-Mobile	HTC Artemis 110	2006-10	Windows Mobile 5.0 Pocket PC Phone Edition; Windows Mobile 6 Professional
T-Mobile MDA Compact IV	T-Mobile	HTC Diamond	2008-05	Windows Mobile 6.1 Professional
T-Mobile MDA Compact V	T-Mobile	HTC Touch Diamond 2	2009 Q2	Windows Mobile 6.1 (upgradeable to Windows Mobile 6.5)
T-Mobile MDA Mail	T-Mobile	HTC Excalibur 160, with the Wi-Fi chip removed	2006	Windows Mobile 5.0 / 6.0 Smartphone Edition
T-Mobile MDA Pro	T-Mobile	HTC Universal	2005 Q3	Windows Mobile 5.0
T-Mobile MDA Touch	T-Mobile	HTC Elf 300	2006-07	Windows Mobile 6.0
T-Mobile MDA Touch 256	T-Mobile	HTC Elfin 300	2007-11	Windows Mobile 6.0 (upgradeable to Windows Mobile 6.1)
T-Mobile MDA Touch Plus	T-Mobile	HTC Niki 200	2008 (T-Mobile)	Windows Mobile 6 Professional
T-Mobile MDA Vario	T-Mobile	HTC Wizard 200	2005-10	Windows Mobile 5.0
T-Mobile MDA Vario II	T-Mobile	HTC Hermes 300	2006-06	Windows Mobile 5.0, upgradeable to Windows Mobile 6
T-Mobile MDA Vario III	T-Mobile	HTC Kaiser 120	2007-09	Windows Mobile 6.1
T-Mobile MDA Vario IV	T-Mobile	HTC Raphael	2008-08	Windows Mobile 6.1 Professional
