= Acer N series =

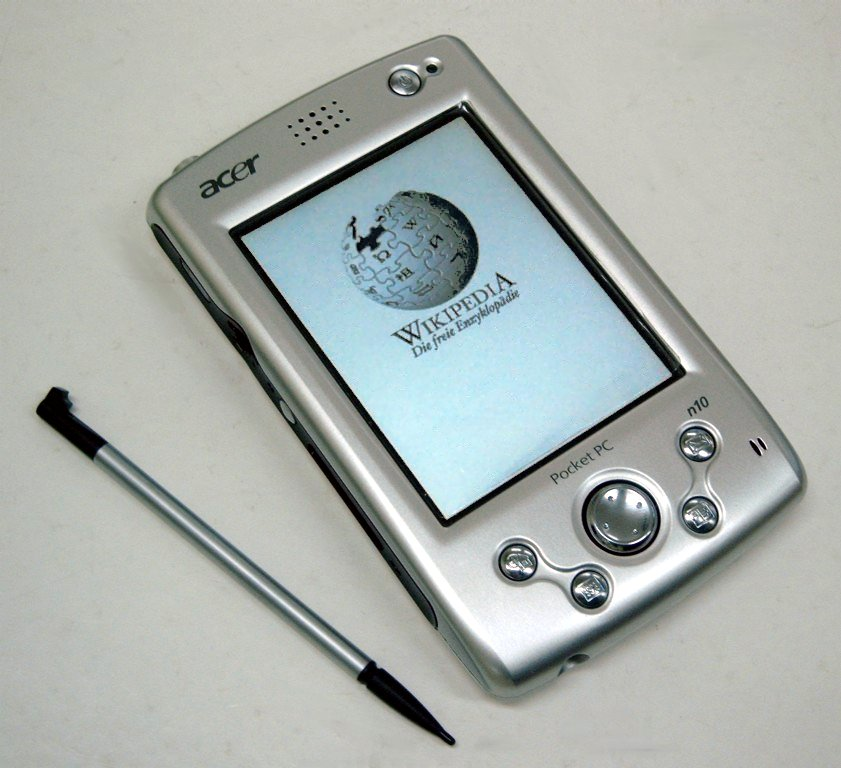
Acer N10

The Acer N series is a line of PDAs produced by Acer for the Pocket PC 2002 operating system and its successors over the period 2003 to 2005.

The newer models are ones from the n300 series – Acer n310 and Acer n311. The Acer N series is well known for the USB hosts in the newer models.

By the time of the introduction of the later models smartphones were thought to beginning to make significant in-roads into the market for PDAs.

Models
Model	Introduced	Processor	Speed	Screen	Native OS	Features
Acer N10	2003	XScale PXA255	300MHz	240x320	Pocket PC 2002	
Acer N20	2003					
Acer N30	2004	Samsung S3C2410	266MHz	240x320	Windows Mobile 2003	Bluetooth capable
Acer N35	2004	Samsung S3C2410	266MHz	240x320	Windows Mobile 2003	with integrated GPS receiver
Acer N50	2005			320x240	Windows Mobile 2003SE	USB
Acer N300	2005		300MHz		Windows Mobile 5.0	As N310 but slower clock speed
Acer N310	2005	Arm-900 S3C2440	400MHz	640x480	Windows Mobile 5.0	As N311 but no Cradle
Acer N311	2005	Arm-900 S3C2440	400MHz	640x480	Windows Mobile 5.0	Wi-Fi, USB, SD card slot
