= Gears (software) =

Google software to create web apps

- Developer: Google
- Initial release: May 31, 2007; 18 years ago
- Final release: 0.5.36.0 (February 22, 2010; 15 years ago) [±]
- Operating system: Windows XP, Windows Vista, Windows 7, Windows Mobile 5, Windows Mobile 6, macOS, Linux, BlackBerry OS 5
- License: BSD
- Website: gears.google.com at the Wayback Machine (archived 2008-02-23)

Gears, formerly Google Gears, is a discontinued utility software offered by Google to create more powerful web apps by adding offline storage and other features to web browsers. Released under the BSD license, Gears is free and open-source. Gears was conceived at a time when a comparable alternative was not available. However, Gears was discontinued in favor of the standardized HTML5 methods that eventually became prevalent.

== Components ==
There were several major API components to Gears:

- A Database module (powered by SQLite), which could store data locally.
- A WorkerPool module, which provided parallel execution of JavaScript code.
- A LocalServer module, which cached and served application resources (HTML, JavaScript, images, etc.).
- A Desktop module, which let web applications interact more naturally with the desktop.
- A Geolocation module, which let web applications detect the geographical location of their users.

== Version history ==
Version	Date	Description
0.1	2007-05-31	Initial release as Google Gears.
0.2	2008-02-22	
-	2008-05-28	Project renamed to Gears to reflect the open source, collaborative nature of the project.
0.3	2008-06-11	Introduced ability to add desktop icons, support for Mozilla Firefox 3.
0.4	2008-08-22	Geolocation API / Event handling for upload / download transfer progress, localization in 40 languages
0.5	2008-11-24	Updated SQLite, Geolocation can now get data from WiFi antennas, Improved API to manage data blobs on LocalServer

== Support ==
Several web applications from a variety of companies used Gears at some point, including Google (Gmail, YouTube, Docs, Reader, Picasa for mobile, Calendar, Wave), MySpace (Mail Search), Zoho Office Suite, Remember The Milk, and Buxfer. WordPress 2.6 added support for Gears, to speed up the administrative interface and reduce server hits. However, after Google announced in February 2010 that there would be no further development of Gears (see End of life section), several of these applications discontinued their support for Gears, including Google Reader and WordPress.

Gears could be enabled on sites where it was otherwise unsupported, by using a Greasemonkey user script that one of the Gears engineers created.

Gears was supported on Internet Explorer 6 and 8 on Windows XP, Vista and 7; Internet Explorer Mobile 4.01 and later on Windows Mobile; Safari 3.1.1 and later on Mac OS X 10.4 and later (though not Safari 4 on Mac OS X 10.6); Firefox 1.5 and later on multiple platforms; and the native browser on BlackBerry OS 5. There was only limited 64-bit support from third parties.

Gears did not support attachment files with sizes greater than 2 GB under Mac OS X Leopard or Snow Leopard due to a bug in the Blob handling code.

On May 29, 2008, Opera Software ASA announced that Opera Mobile 9.5 would support Gears. The technology preview release of the browser was published on February 20, 2009. It was available for touchscreen devices running Windows Mobile 5 and 6 only. Gears was not built into browsers other than Google Chrome and had to be downloaded separately.

The Ruby on Rails framework supported interfaces to Gears without needing to understand the Google Gears API.

== End of life ==
In late November 2009, numerous online news sources reported that Google was going to migrate to Web Storage rather than use Gears in the future. A Google spokesman later clarified that Google would, however, continue to support Gears so as not to break sites using it. On February 19, 2010, the Gears team at Google announced that the development of Google Gears had stopped, as they are working on bringing all of the Gears capabilities into web standards like HTML5. Although development of new features had ceased, Google was planning to continue supporting Gears until they have developed a "simple, comprehensive" method for users' data to be migrated to HTML5 features. On 22 November 2011, Google announced that on 1 December 2011, Gears support would be removed from Gmail and Google Calendar. Gears was removed from Google Chrome on June 7, 2011.

== See also ==
- Progressive web app
- Rich Internet application
- Adobe AIR
