= Jawbreaker (Windows Mobile game) =

2003 video game

Jawbreaker / Bubblets / Bubblet / Bubble Breaker
- Developer: Oopdreams software, Inc.
- Publisher: Microsoft
- Platforms: WM:Windows Mobile 2003, Palm:Palm OS, Win:Microsoft Windows, iPhone/iPod Touch:iPhone OS
- Release: Pocket PC: April 7, 2003 (packaged with Windows Mobile 2003)
- Genre: Puzzle games
- Mode: Single player

Jawbreaker is a port of SameGame for the Pocket PC bundled with the Microsoft Windows Mobile 2003 operating system for PDAs. The operating system, and thus the game, was officially released on April 7, 2003. The game itself was developed by American studio oopdreams software, Inc. Jawbreaker is officially listed as one of the "Core Applications" of the Windows Mobile software family, in a paper released by Microsoft. In Windows Mobile 5.0 and Windows Mobile 6.0 it is called Bubble Breaker. The original non-bundled version of the game is available from the developer itself as Bubblets.

== Gameplay ==
The game-board consists of a screen of differently-colored balls arranged in a matrix. There are five different colors: red, blue, green, yellow and purple. The player then clicks on any two or more connecting similarly-colored balls to eliminate them from the matrix, earning an appropriate number of points in the process. The more balls eliminated at once, the higher the points added to the player's score.

The scoring can be expressed in the formula "Y=X(X-1)". X represents the number of balls grouped together, Y is the resulting score. For example an elimination of 16 balls will result in 240 points (240=16(16-1)).

In the standard mode of the game, the game ends when the player has no more moves left; there are no more like-colored balls adjacent to each other. The screen immediately goes to the scoring screen, where statistics such as Average Score, Total Score and Games Played can be seen, along with a button that the player can press in order to start a new game.

=== Game Options and Modes ===
==== Breaker Set ====
The Breaker Set option allows the player to choose between Colorful Breakers and Greyscale Breakers. The first option is the default and sets the game balls' colors to the standard five colors. Choosing the latter changes the color palette and instead of differently-colored balls, the balls are adorned with various unique greyscale patterns allowing players with monochromatic Pocket PCs to play the game, as well as players who may be colorblind and have trouble differentiating the colored balls from one another. Some of the patterns include lightly colored balls, dark grey balls and a white ball with a dark dot in the middle.

==== Game Styles ====
The player has four unique game styles to choose from, including Standard, which is described above. The other game styles are Continuous, Shifter and MegaShift.

Continuous mode is similar to the standard mode, with one major difference: Whenever the player clears an entire column of balls, a new one arrives from the left side of the game board. New columns can be previewed in a small area at the bottom of the screen. As with the regular standard mode, the game ends when the player runs out of adjacent like-colored balls.

In MegaShift mode, there is an addition of a new column of balls whenever the player clears an entire column of balls from the game board. Balls will always move to the right of the screen if there is space for them to do so. The newly-appearing column of balls can be previewed at the bottom of the screen before they are brought on-board and they appear from the leftmost side of the game board. As with the other modes, the game ends when the player ceases to have any moves left.

Shifter mode is similar to the MegaShift mode in that balls will tend to gravitate towards the right part of the game board. But unlike MegaShift mode, the board has a finite number of balls and no new balls arrive to replenish the ones the player clicks off the game board.

== History ==
Windows Mobile 2003 was Jawbreaker's first inclusion into a packaged handheld operating system. Pocket PC operating systems prior to Windows Mobile 2003, ending with Pocket PC 2002 did not include the game. It has since been bundled with succeeding Windows Mobile releases, including Windows Mobile 2003 SE (second edition) and Windows Mobile 5.0 & 6.0.

== Jawbreaker in other operating systems ==
Jawbreaker has been distributed by Oopdreams Software, Inc. under another name, Bubblets. Bubblets is almost-identical to Jawbreaker, with some slight visual and semantic differences. Instead of balls, the player bursts bubbles, thus the name.

Bubblets in this form is available for a much broader range of operating systems than the Jawbreaker version. The game is officially distributed as shareware for Pocket PC 2002/Windows Mobile 2003, Palm OS, and the Handheld PC Pro platforms. Bubblets is also available for desktop PCs, with the official Windows version of Bubblets, also distributed as expiring shareware. As Bubblets, the game was a finalist for the Best Puzzle Game category of Pocket PC Magazine's Pocket PC Award Winners of 2001, won by another SameGame clone called PocketPop produced by PocketFun (http://www.pocketfun.co.uk/PocketPopRevenge.html). It was given the People's Choice Award in the same event.

The Palm OS version of the game Bubblet, was favorably reviewed by PDAStreet's Palm Boulevard. Geek.com gave Bubblets a perfect score on their review and was named a Geek.com pick.

The game has been distributed as freeware for mobiles since June 2008. The mobile phone version, also called JawBreaker, was developed for those who did not have Jawbreaker-capable PDAs but had phones supporting Java ME. This iteration of the game could be run on mobile devices supporting Java ME CLDC 1.1/MIDP 2.0 with screen resolutions of 240×320 or 176×220.

There is also a JavaScript online version published as Google Gadget.
