= Toshiba g500 =

Toshiba G500
- Manufacturer: Toshiba
- Type: Smartphone
- Operating system: Windows Mobile 5.0 Smartphone
- CPU: Marvell PXA270, 400 MHz
- Memory: 128 MB internal flash 64 MB RAM miniSD memory card
- Display: 2.4 in. LCD screen, 240x320 px, 65k-color QVGA TFT
- Input: Keypad, D-PAD
- Camera: 2.0 Megapixel
- Connectivity: GSM / GPRS, EDGE, Bluetooth, 802.11b/g, USB
- Power: Rechargeable 1100 mAh Li-ion battery (up to 290 hrs standby, 280 mins talk time)
- Dimensions: 96 x 49 x 22.9 mm
- Weight: 135 g (including battery)

The Toshiba Portégé G500 is a Windows Mobile smartphone produced by Toshiba. Its main feature is its fingerprint scanner, which allows increased security for the device.

== Features ==
The Toshiba G500 runs Windows Mobile 5 for smartphone, on a Marvell Xscale PXA270, 416 MHz processor. Original operating system is Windows Mobile 5 for smartphone and doesn't has any official update to superior versions. However, there are some user made ROMS which include Windows Mobile 6.5. Using Toshiba G900 IPM drivers, processor can run on 520 MHz frequency. Phone has Qualcomm MSM6280 processor as a radio unit. Supported 2G/3G standards: 3G(UMTS) 2100: 1920-2170 MHz GSM 900 : 880-960 MHz DCS 1800 : 1710-1880 MHz PCS 1900 : 1850-1990 MHz
