= Toshiba Dynapocket IS02 =

2010 smartphone model

dynapocket IS02 (TSI01)
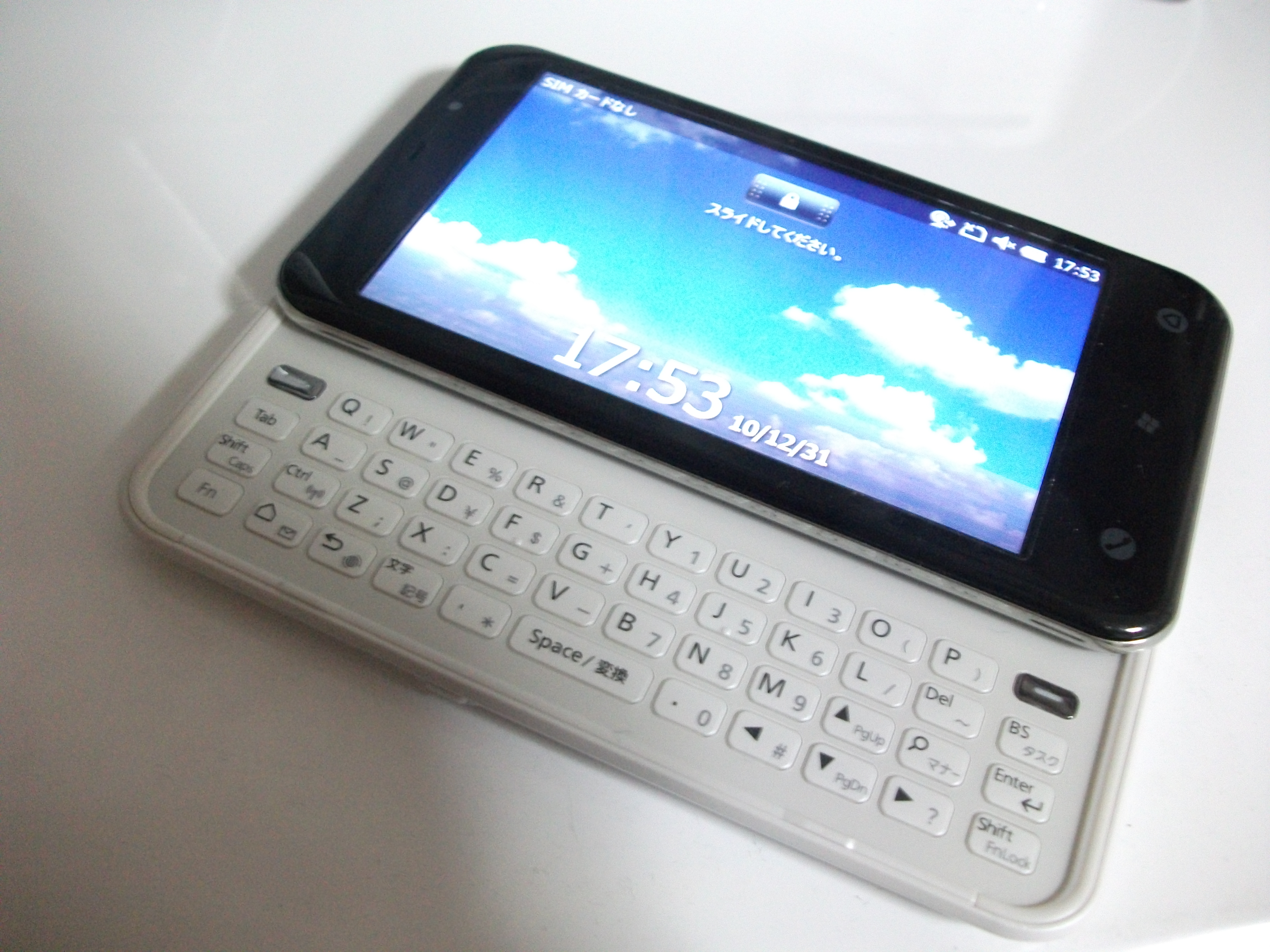
- Open position (with QWERTY keyboard)
- Brand: au
- Manufacturer: Toshiba
- First released: June 24, 2010
- Form factor: Side-sliding Smartphone
- Colors: Black * White
- Dimensions: 123 mm H 66 mm W 12.9 mm D
- Weight: Approx. 158 g
- Operating system: Windows Mobile 6.5.3 Professional (Japanese Edition)
- CPU: 1 GHz Qualcomm Snapdragon S1 (QSD8650)
- Memory: 384 MB RAM
- Storage: 512 MB ROM (150 MB user data folder)
- Removable storage: microSD (up to 2 GB), microSDHC (up to 16 GB)
- Charging: Approx. 160 minutes
- Rear camera: Approx. 3.22 megapixels, CMOS, autofocus (image stabilization not supported)
- Front camera: None
- Display: 4.1-inch OLED display, Wide VGA (240 RGBG × 800 dots, dynamically upscaled to 480 × 800 pixels), approx. 260,000 colors
- Model: TSI01 (Manufacturer code: RP8-J01)
- Made in: China

The dynapocket IS02 (TSI01) is a slide-out QWERTY keyboard smartphone developed for the Japanese market by Toshiba Mobile Communications (Toshiba MC) and Toshiba. Announed at the Mobile World Congress 2010 and released on June 24, 2010 alongside iPhone 4 as part of the IS series under the au brand operated by KDDI and Okinawa Cellular Telephone Company, it supports CDMA 1X WIN networks. It is the Japanese market variant of Toshiba's global handset model, the K01, and shares its underlying architecture with the dynapocket T-01B released by NTT Docomo. Following the transition of Toshiba's mobile unit to Fujitsu Toshiba Mobile Communications (later FCNT) in October 2010, the IS02 became the only smartphone for au developed, manufactured, and released entirely under Toshiba MC.

Unlike the enterprise-centric E30HT, the IS02 was positioned directly toward general consumers. Charging is accomplished via a microUSB-to-18-pin adapter connected to au's standardized common charging unit.

== Overview ==
=== Appearance ===
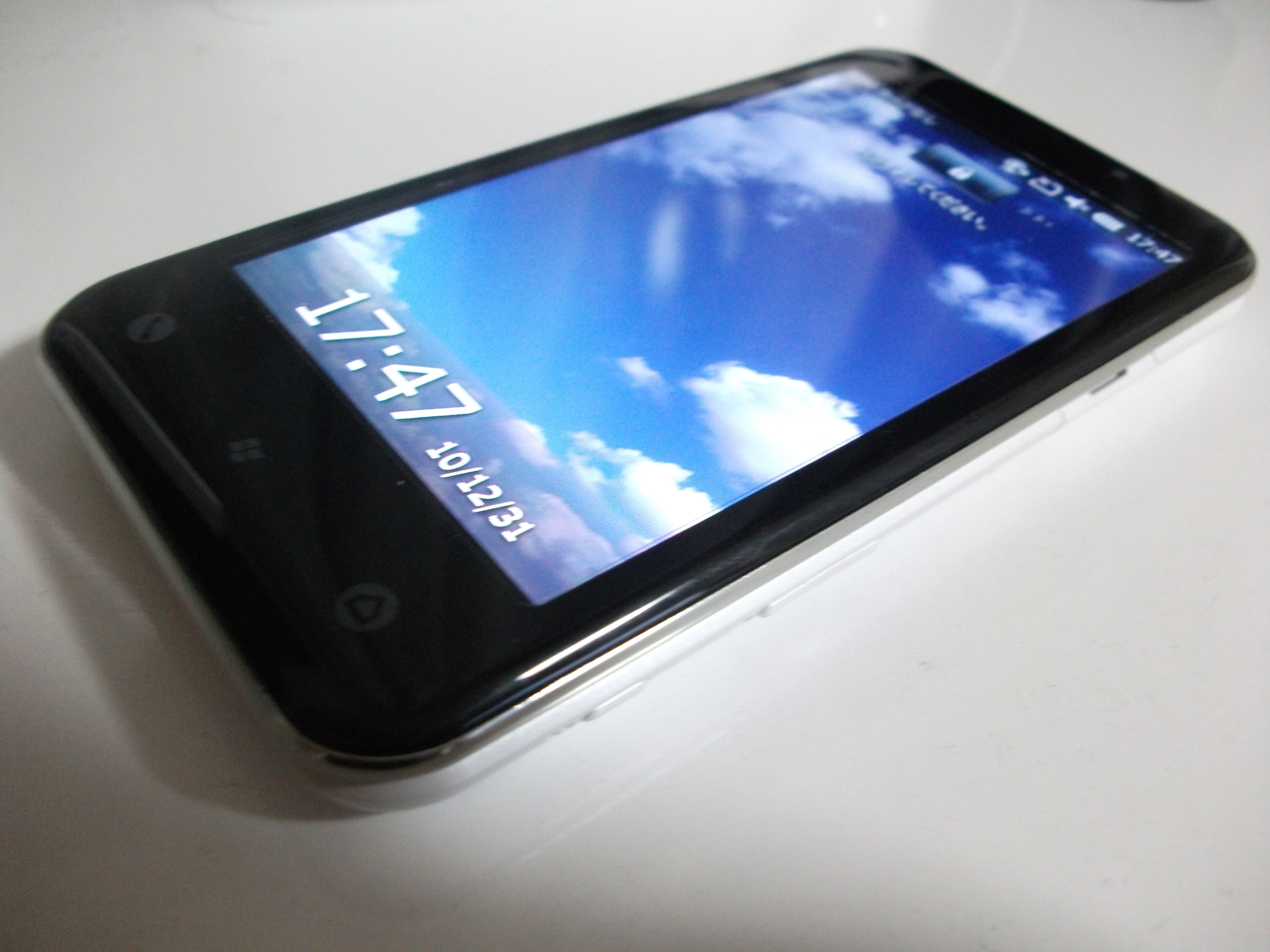
front panel view

The IS02 arrived roughly one year and one month after the carrier's previous Windows Mobile device, the E30HT. Upon its debut in June 2011, it was recognized as the world's thinnest slide-out smartphone equipped with a physical QWERTY keyboard.

=== Specifications ===
Aimed at individual customers under the IS series banner, it represents au's first and final smartphone built around the Windows Mobile 6.x framework. It was shipped with Windows Mobile 6.5.3 Professional pre-installed out of the box. Similar to its Docomo twin, the T-01B, it features Toshiba's proprietary "NX! UI" layer. The device features a 4.1-inch OLED display with a wide VGA resolution ot 480 × 800 pixels.

=== Other features ===
It was the world's first smartphone to feature support for Japan's Emergency Earthquake Notification system. While the device shipped with Office Mobile pre-installed—offering a free upgrade to Office Mobile 2010 via the Windows Marketplace for Mobile—its communication features were initially limited. At launch, C-Mail (SMS) functionality was restricted to receiving messages only, with sending capabilities later added via an update in September.
