= G500 =

G500 may refer to:

- Gulfstream G500, a Gulfstream Aerospace business jet
- Logitech G500, a corded laser mouse
- Mercedes-Benz G500, a four-wheel drive sport utility vehicle
- Toshiba G500 smartphone
- Fortune Global 500, an annual ranking of the top 500 corporations worldwide as measured by revenue
