= HTC Touch2 =

Mobile telephone

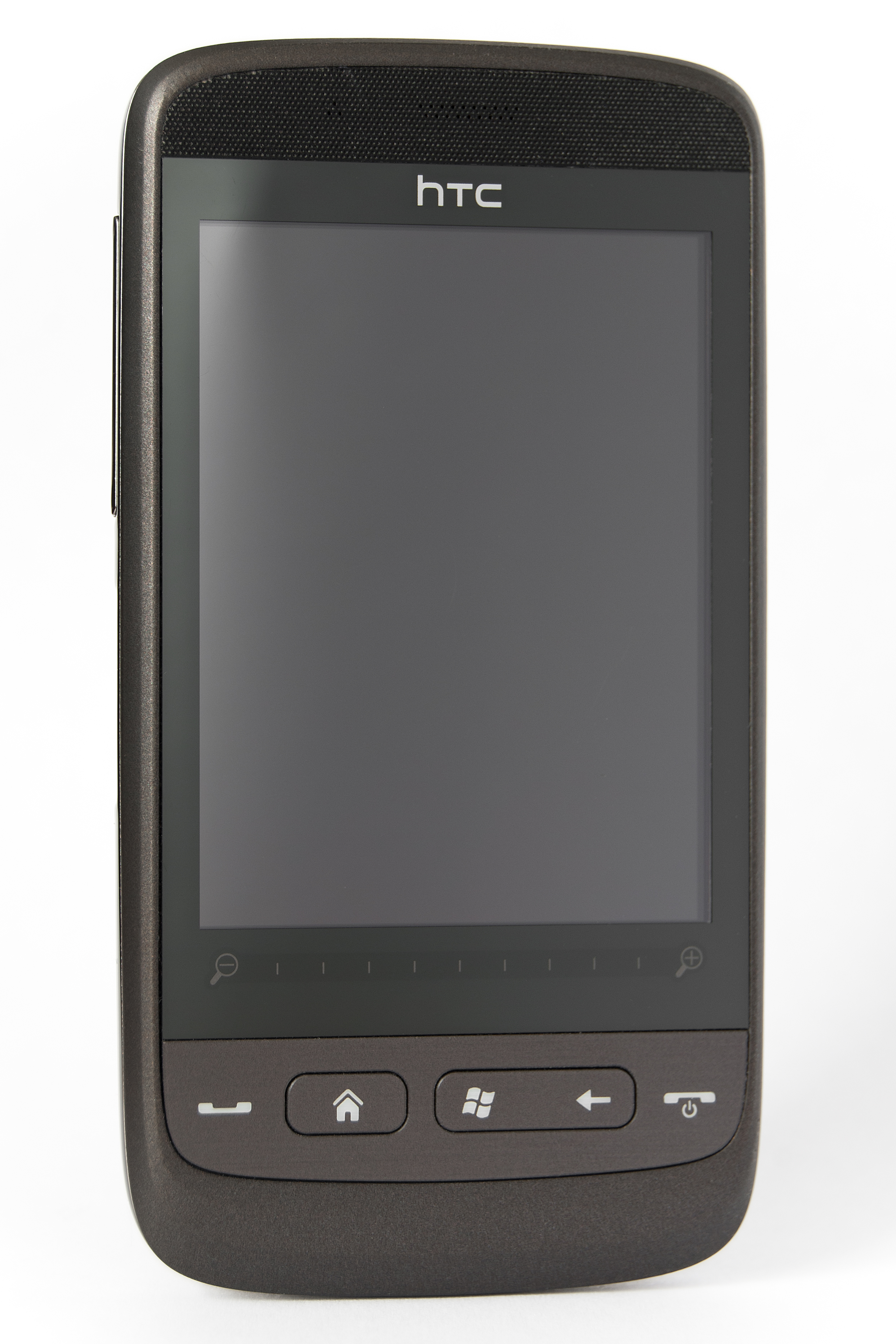
- Manufacturer: HTC Corporation
- Series: HTC Touch family
- Availability by region: October 2009; 16 years ago
- Predecessor: HTC Touch
- Related: HTC HD2, HTC Touch Pro2
- Compatible networks: Quadband GSM / GPRS, EDGE and dual band WCDMA, HSDPA, HSUPA
- Dimensions: 104 x 55 x 12.9 mm (4.09 x 2.17 x 0.51 in)
- Weight: 110 g (3.88 oz)
- Operating system: Windows Mobile 6.5 Professional
- CPU: 528 MHz Qualcomm MSM7225
- Memory: 256 MB RAM
- Storage: 512 MB internal flash (260 MB user available)
- Removable storage: microSDHC, up to 32 GB
- Battery: Rechargeable 1100mAh Li-ion battery (Extended Battery Available)(up to 370 hrs standby, 7.3 hrs talk time)
- Rear camera: 3.2-megapixel CMOS sensor, picture up to 2048x1536 video up to 352×288
- Display: 2.8 in. LCD resistive touchscreen 240x320 px 65k-color QVGA, backlit TFT LCD
- Connectivity: Bluetooth, 802.11b/g, A-GPS, micro-USB, 3.5mm audio jack
- Data inputs: Resistive touchscreen and stylus pen

The HTC Touch2 (also known as the HTC T3333 and HTC Mega), is a mobile telephone running the Windows Mobile operating system. The phone was designed and manufactured by HTC, and was released in Europe in November 2009. It is a middle budget smart phone featuring Windows Mobile 6.5 and Touch Flo 2D.

== Specifications ==
- Screen size: 2.8 in (71 mm)
- Screen resolution: 240 x 320, QVGA, backlit TFT LCD
- Input devices: Resistive touchscreen, front panel buttons
- Battery: 1100 mAh
- Talk time: 440 minutes (GSM) to 370 minutes (WCDMA)
- Standby time: 370 hours (GSM) to 500 hours (WCDMA)
- 3.2-megapixel rear-facing camera
- GPS and A-GPS
- 520 MHz Qualcomm MSM7225 processor
- RAM: 256 MB
- ROM: 512 MB
- TouchFLO 2D
- Browser: Opera Mobile and Internet Explorer
- 3G: Up to 7.2 Mbit/s download speed, up to 384 kbit/s upload speed
- microSD slot (SDHC compatible) up to 32 GB
- Operating system: Windows Mobile 6.5 Professional
- Quad band GSM/GPRS/EDGE (GSM 850, GSM 900, GSM 1800, GSM 1900)
- Wi-Fi (802.11b/g) (Including WiFi router)
- Bluetooth 2.1 + EDR & A2DP
- Mini USB
- 3.5 mm audio jack, microphone, speaker
- FM radio
- Size: 104 mm (4.1 in) (h) 55 mm (2.2 in) (w) 12.9 mm (0.51 in) (d)
- Weight: 110 g (3.9 oz) with battery
