= E310 =

E310 may refer to:

- Toshiba e310
- Propyl gallate E number E310
- a Dell Dimension E series computer model
