= Toshiba e310 =

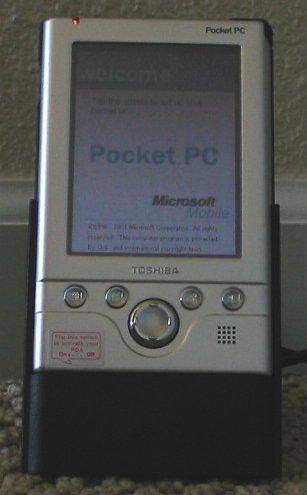
- Toshiba e310 standing in its dock
- Manufacturer: Toshiba
- Type: personal digital assistant
- Released: April 2002; 24 years ago
- Introductory price: US$899 (equivalent to $1,609 in 2025)
- Discontinued: October 2002
- Operating system: Windows Pocket PC 2000
- CPU: Intel Strong Arm SA-1110 CPU @ 206MHz
- Memory: 32MB built-in RAM, 32MB Flash ROM
- Removable storage: Secure Digital card slot
- Display: 3.5" Reflective TFT Color touch-screen LCD (65,536 colors)
- Graphics: 240x320 pixel
- Connectivity: IrDA; USB 1.1 cradle
- Power: Lithium-ion battery
- Dimensions: 12.45 x 7.87 x 1.19cm
- Weight: 142g (5oz)
- Related: Toshiba e570

The Toshiba e310 was a personal digital assistant manufactured by Toshiba and first released in 2002. It ran Windows Pocket PC 2000 and featured a color 240x320 pixel touch-screen LCD, a 206 MHz CPU, and 32MB of RAM. It was also equipped with a Secure Digital card slot, allowing for the expansion of internal memory and a Lithium-ion battery. A software upgrade was issued by Toshiba in 2003.

It was particularly small, thin and light at 12.45 x 7.87 x 1.19 cm and 142g.
