= Windows Mobile 6.1 =

Discontinued mobile operating system by Microsoft

- Version of the Windows Mobile operating system

- Today screen of Windows Mobile 6.1
- Developer: Microsoft Corporation
- Working state: Discontinued
- Source model: Closed source
- Released to manufacturing: April 1, 2008; 18 years ago
- Kernel type: Windows CE
- Preceded by: Windows Mobile 6.0
- Succeeded by: Windows Mobile 6.5

Support status
- Unsupported as of January 8, 2013.

Windows Mobile 6.1 is a version of the Windows Mobile operating system, released on April 1, 2008. It is a minor upgrade to the Windows Mobile 6 platform with various performance enhancements and a redesigned Home screen featuring horizontal tiles that expand on clicking to display more information, although this new home screen is featured only on Windows Mobile Standard edition. This was not supported in the Professional edition. Several other changes such as threaded SMS, full page zooming in Internet Explorer and 'Domain Enroll' were also added, along with a "mobile" version of the Microsoft OneNote program and an interactive "Getting Started" wizard. Domain Enroll is a functionality to connect the device to System Center Mobile Device Manager 2008, a product to manage mobile devices. The most apparent of the other differences is that the Standard version (like prior versions) still creates automatic links for telephone numbers in Tasks and Appointments, which allows for the easier click and dial of stored telephone numbers within these Outlook items. This feature is not supported in the Professional version. Windows Mobile 6.1 also had improved bandwidth efficiency in its push-email protocol "Activesync" of "up to 40.02%"; this considerably improved battery life in many devices.

== Operating system ==
Aside from the visual and feature distinctions, the underlying CE versions can be used to differentiate WM6.0 from WM 6.1. The version of Windows CE in WM 6.0 is 5.2.*, with the final number being a 4 digit build ID (e.g. 5.2.1622 on HTC Wing). In WM 6.1, the CE version is 5.2.* with a 5 digit build number (e.g. 5.2.19216 on Palm Treo 800w).

== See also ==
- Pocket PC 2000 – Version of the Windows Mobile operating system
- Pocket PC 2002 – Version of Windows Mobile, released in 2001
- Windows Mobile 2003 – Version of the Windows Mobile operating system
- Windows Mobile 5.0 – Version of Windows Mobile, released in 2005
- Windows Mobile 6.0 – Discontinued mobile operating system by Microsoft
- Windows Mobile 6.5 – Mobile operating system by Microsoft
- Windows Phone 7 – First generation of Microsoft's Windows Phone mobile operating system
- Windows Phone 8 – Second generation of Microsoft's Windows Phone mobile operating system
- Windows Phone 8.1 – Third generation of Microsoft's Windows Phone mobile operating system
- Windows 10 Mobile – Mobile operating system developed by Microsoft
