= Pocket PC 2000 =

Version of the Windows Mobile operating system

- Version of the Windows Mobile operating system

- Today screen of Pocket PC 2000
- Developer: Microsoft
- Source model: Closed source
- Released to manufacturing: April 19, 2000; 26 years ago
- Supported platforms: ARM; MIPS; SH-3
- Kernel type: Monolithic (Windows CE)
- License: Proprietary commercial software
- Preceded by: Palm-size PC
- Succeeded by: Pocket PC 2002
- Official website: www.microsoft.com/mobile/pocketpc

Support status
- Mainstream support ended on September 30, 2005; Extended support ended on October 9, 2007

Pocket PC 2000 (marketed as Pocket PC) was the first member of the Windows Mobile family of mobile operating systems that was released on April 19, 2000, and was based on Windows CE 3.0. It is the successor to the operating system aboard Palm-size PCs; backwards compatibility was retained with such Palm-size PC applications. It was mainly intended for Pocket PC devices; however, several Palm-size PC devices also had the ability to be updated. Furthermore, several Pocket PC 2000 phones were released (under the name Handheld PC 2000), although Microsoft's "Smartphone" hardware platform had not yet been established at that time.

Aesthetically, Pocket PC 2000 was meant to be similar in design to the then-current Windows 98 and Windows 2000 desktop operating systems, as well as the yet-to-be-released Windows Me (which was still in development at the time of Pocket PC 2000's release). It had multiple built-in applications, many of them similarly branded to match their desktop counterparts, such as Microsoft Reader, Microsoft Money, Pocket Internet Explorer, and Windows Media Player. A version of Microsoft Office called Pocket Office was also bundled and included Pocket Word, Pocket Excel and Pocket Outlook. Notes, a note-taking app saw its first release and would be supported by most later versions of Windows Mobile.

When Pocket PC 2000 was released, Pocket PC devices had not been standardized with a specific CPU architecture. As a result, it was released on multiple CPU architectures, such as SH-3, MIPS, and ARM. The only resolution supported by this release was 240 x 320 (QVGA). Removable storage card formats that were supported were CompactFlash and MultiMediaCard. Infrared (IR) File beaming capability was among the original hardware features.

Mainstream support for the operating system ended on September 30, 2005, and extended support ended on October 9, 2007.

== History ==
Microsoft long knew of the importance and potential of mobile computers, and in the 1990s had made previous attempts to capture the market. It released in 1993 Windows for Pen Computing, a software used to add pen computing functions to mobile computers running Windows 3.1. The software's potential for success was hampered by its ponderous base code and the fact that handwriting recognition technology at the time had practical limitations. Microsoft then sought to develop a device called WinPad, which would have been used to wirelessly access and synchronize data between it and desktop machines, as well as other WinPads, but its operating system's large consumption of resources caused the company to redesign as Microsoft at Work, an embedded operating system for office machines, with similar synchronization functions. However, its delayed, costly development and device manufacturers subsequently abandoning it led to the project's cancellation. During that time, Microsoft also began work on a project to develop a device used to communicate with paging systems, and its operating system was to be used in set-top boxes, but that project proved to be too ambitious and thus folded in 1995.

The teams of the two cancelled projects were consolidated in 1995, and Microsoft hoped to create a mobile device that ran on the Windows NT kernel. It decided to use its new kernel, Windows CE, after realizing that Windows NT was too bulky to fit on a device. This kernel debuted in Microsoft's "Handheld PC", and reappeared in the company's Palm-size PC, both of which were criticized for their slow performance, short battery life, and graphical user interface. With these devices, Microsoft had only ten percent of the personal digital assistant (PDA) market share, whereas its rival, Palm, Inc., had over half of it.

Microsoft reapproached Windows CE's design in the development of its third PDA, then codenamed "Rapier". Its desktop user interface was replaced with one more suited for mobile devices, more applications came preinstalled, and the company more firmly defined and extended both the hardware and software specifications to ensure software compatibility. Windows CE 3.0 became the operating system for Microsoft's next PDA and the first member of the Windows Mobile family, Pocket PC, and it was launched on April 19, 2000. A Japanese-language edition of Pocket PC was released in Japan on July 13. To distinguish it from its successors, the operating system is referred to as Pocket PC 2000.

== System features ==
Built on the Windows CE 3.0 kernel, the user interface was designed from the ground up to more closely resemble Palm OS's and much less that of a personal computer, while still retaining the look and feel of Windows desktops. The first screen that is displayed upon booting is the Today screen, where the user can check their email inbox and view the calendar and their scheduled appointments and tasks, as well as the device's owner information. The top of the screen is filled by a navigation bar, which on the left side contains a button that opens the Start menu and on the right the current time. On the bottom of the screen is a "command bar", containing menus and buttons that execute commands for programs. The user navigates the interface by tapping the stylus and pressing the buttons on the device. New to Microsoft's line of PDAs is tapping and holding on items to open context menus, analogous to right-clicking on a desktop computer.

When the Start button is tapped, the Start menu drops down, revealing a bar of six last-run applications, a number of pinned applications, the menus where the applications and system settings are located, the ability to search files' names and contents, and an online application that provides help relevant to the current program. Files are managed using the File Explorer. They may be placed inside folders, and are all found inside the root folder, My Device. Character input is provided via either an online character or handwriting recognition system or an on-screen keyboard.

Pocket PC 2000 is bundled with a pocket version of Microsoft Office, an office suite that features pocket versions of Excel and Word. Also included is a pocket version of the web browser Internet Explorer, based on version 3.1. Features of version 3.1 not supported by Pocket Internet Explorer are Java applets; VBScript; and HTML tags <applet>, <blink>, <isindex>, <link>, <marquee>, <object>, and <style>. The web browser's encryption key size is only 40 bits long, rather than 128 bits at the time. Microsoft released a separate add-on offering support for the 128-bit Secure Sockets Layer protocol.

The capabilities of the hardware devices running Pocket PC made the operating system suitable for multimedia and playing Windows CE games. Windows Media Player is used to play back MP3 and WMA files. Voice Recorder is used to capture sound via the device's microphone, which is then saved in the WAV format, and can be played back here. A majority of the games for Windows CE were made freely downloadable from the Internet, and a few were titles launched commercially at retail stores and on websites. Included in every Pocket PC device is the card game Microsoft Solitaire. The rest of the games are installed by connecting the device to and running the setup program on a computer.

== Hardware ==
All Pocket PC 2000 devices have a USB port and an infrared port that meets the Infrared Data Association standard. The USB port has the sole function of synchronizing data with PCs and does not support peripherals. The infrared port is used to transfer data between PCs or other Pocket PC devices at a maximum speed of 115.2 kbps.

Most Pocket PC 2000 devices shipped with 32 MB of random access memory (RAM) and a few had an expansion slot for memory cards. These slots supported PC cards and those for mobile devices, such as the CompactFlash. The memory itself is used to store both files and working data, and is allocated to either of them both automatically and manually. At this time, there was no set standard for which instruction set architecture to use, but all devices used either MIPS, SH-3, or StrongARM processors. The processors ran with top speeds ranging from 131 to 206 MHz.

== Reception ==
CNET compared Pocket PC 2000 and Palm OS devices and considered the latter to be its favorite personal digital assistant, scoring it 8 points out of 10—one point higher than Pocket PC—because of its simple interface, stability, and lower price. It praised Pocket PC's improved user interface, bundled applications and ability to continuously synchronize mobile and desktop computer data, but criticized its inconsistent character recognition system. It concluded that Pocket PC was best suited for users who liked Windows and were unconcerned about budget. InfoWorld viewed the operating system as an excellent platform for application developers, especially those writing in C++, praising the ease of development and portability of Windows applications, as well as support for networking and database access, although criticizing the lack of scripting in JScript and VBScript and decisions by hardware manufacturers such as to limit the devices to one expansion slot, not design their USB ports for expandability, and an underpowered infrared. It wrote that Pocket PC was a viable alternative to laptops for its price.

Within ten months, one million devices running Pocket PC 2000 were shipped. In May 2001, the figure was 1.25 million. NPD Intelect reported that in the US, the devices made for 26 percent of sales priced at $350 or higher, but only 10 percent of sales overall, and that Palm OS devices filled almost all of the rest of the market share. By August, about two million Pocket PC devices were sold. The best-selling model series was Compaq's iPAQ, which had dominated the market since its debut in 2000. The operating system's successor, Pocket PC 2002, was released in October 2001.

== See also ==
- Pocket PC 2002 – Version of Windows Mobile, released in 2001
- Windows Mobile 2003 – Version of the Windows Mobile operating system
- Windows Mobile 5.0 – Version of Windows Mobile, released in 2005
- Windows Mobile 6.0 – Discontinued mobile operating system by Microsoft
- Windows Mobile 6.1 – Discontinued mobile operating system by Microsoft
- Windows Mobile 6.5 – Mobile operating system by Microsoft

== Sources ==
- McPherson, Frank (2000). How to Do Everything with Your Pocket PC and Handheld PC. Osborne/McGraw-Hill. ISBN 0-07-212420-2.
