= Windows Mobile 2003 =

Version of the Windows Mobile operating system

- Version of the Windows Mobile operating system

- Today screen
- Developer: Microsoft
- Source model: Closed source
- Released to manufacturing: June 23, 2003; 23 years ago
- Preceded by: Pocket PC 2002; Smartphone 2002
- Succeeded by: Windows Mobile 5.0

Support status
- Mainstream support: Ended on July 14, 2009 Extended support: Ended on July 8, 2014

Windows Mobile 2003, originally codenamed "Ozone", is a member of the Windows Mobile family of mobile operating systems, released on June 23, 2003, succeeding Pocket PC 2002 and Smartphone 2002. It was the first Microsoft mobile OS to be called "Windows Mobile" and is based on Windows CE 4.2.

== Editions ==
Windows Mobile 2003 came in four editions:

- Windows Mobile 2003 for Pocket PC Premium Edition
- Windows Mobile 2003 for Pocket PC Professional Edition: Used in Pocket PC budget models and lacked a number of features from the Premium Edition such as a client for L2TP/IPsec VPN.
- Windows Mobile 2003 for Smartphones
- Windows Mobile 2003 for Pocket PC Phone Edition: Designed especially for Pocket PCs which include phone functionality.

== Features ==
The communications interface was enhanced with Bluetooth device management which allowed for Bluetooth file transfer support, Bluetooth headset support and support for Bluetooth add-on keyboards.

A pictures application with viewing, cropping, e-mail, and beaming support was added.

Multimedia improvements included MIDI file support as ringtones in Phone Edition and Windows Media Player 9.0 with streaming optimization.

A puzzle game titled Jawbreaker was among the pre-installed programs. Games API was included with this release to facilitate the development of games for the platform.

Other features/built-in applications included:

- Enhanced Pocket Outlook with vCard and vCal support
- Improved Pocket Internet Explorer
- SMS reply options for Phone Edition.
- Integration of .NET Compact Framework 1.0

== See also ==
- Pocket PC 2000 – Version of the Windows Mobile operating system
- Pocket PC 2002 – Version of Windows Mobile, released in 2001
- Windows Mobile 5.0 – Version of Windows Mobile, released in 2005
- Windows Mobile 6.0 – Discontinued mobile operating system by Microsoft
- Windows Mobile 6.1 – Discontinued mobile operating system by Microsoft
- Windows Mobile 6.5 – Mobile operating system by Microsoft
