= Pocket PC 2002 =

Version of Windows Mobile, released in 2001

- Version of the Windows Mobile operating system

- Pocket PC 2002's interface
- Developer: Microsoft
- Source model: Closed source
- Released to manufacturing: October 4, 2001; 24 years ago
- Supported platforms: ARM
- Kernel type: Windows CE
- Preceded by: Pocket PC 2000
- Succeeded by: Windows Mobile 2003

Support status
- End of Support : October 14, 2008

Pocket PC 2002, originally codenamed "Merlin", is a member of the Windows Mobile family of mobile operating systems, released on October 4, 2001. Like Pocket PC 2000, it was based on Windows CE 3.0. Although mainly targeted for Pocket PC devices, Pocket PC 2002 was also used for Pocket PC phones (Pocket PC 2002 Phone Edition), which were devices that combined the PDA functionality with cellular connectivity.

Aesthetically, Pocket PC 2002 was meant to be similar in design to the then newly released Windows XP. Newly added or updated programs include Windows Media Player 8 with streaming capability, MSN Messenger, and Microsoft Reader 2, with digital rights management support. Upgrades to the bundled version of Office Mobile include a spell checker and word count tool in Pocket Word and improved Pocket Outlook. Connectivity was improved with file beaming on non-Microsoft devices such as Palm OS, the inclusion of Terminal Services and Virtual Private Networking support, and the ability to synchronize folders. Other upgrades include an enhanced UI with theme support and savable downloads and WAP in Pocket Internet Explorer.

On the technical side of things, Pocket PC 2002 removed support for the MIPS and SuperH CPU architectures, leaving only the ARM architecture. The maximum resolution supported by this release was 240×320 (QVGA) on Pocket PC devices, the same as Pocket PC 2000. Another software platform on the same base designed for smartphones (Smartphone 2002) was also released, which were mainly keypad-style GSM devices. With future releases, the Pocket PC and Smartphone lines would increasingly collide as the licensing terms were relaxed allowing OEMs to take advantage of more innovative, individual design ideas.

== See also ==
- Pocket PC 2000 – Version of the Windows Mobile operating system
- Windows Mobile 2003 – Version of the Windows Mobile operating system
- Windows Mobile 5.0 – Version of Windows Mobile, released in 2005
- Windows Mobile 6.0 – Discontinued mobile operating system by Microsoft
- Windows Mobile 6.1 – Discontinued mobile operating system by Microsoft
- Windows Mobile 6.5 – Mobile operating system by Microsoft
