= Windows Mobile 6.0 =

Discontinued mobile operating system by Microsoft

- Version of the Windows Mobile operating system

- Today screen of Windows Mobile 6.0
- Developer: Microsoft Corporation
- Working state: Discontinued
- Source model: Closed source
- Released to manufacturing: February 12, 2007; 19 years ago
- Kernel type: Windows CE
- Preceded by: Windows Mobile 5.0
- Succeeded by: Windows Mobile 6.1

Support status
- Unsupported as of January 8, 2013

Windows Mobile 6, formerly codenamed "Crossbow", is a version of Windows Mobile released on February 12, 2007 at the 3GSM World Congress 2007. It comes in three different versions: "Windows Mobile 6 Standard" for Smartphones (phones with touchscreens), "Windows Mobile 6 Professional" for Pocket PCs with phone functionality, and "Windows Mobile 6 Classic" for Pocket PCs without cellular radios.

Windows Mobile 6 is powered by Windows CE 5.2 kernel and is strongly linked to the then newly introduced Windows Live and Exchange 2007 products. Windows Mobile 6 Standard was first offered on the Orange's SPV E650, while Windows Mobile 6 Professional was first offered on the O2's Xda Terra. Aesthetically, Windows Mobile 6 was meant to be similar in design to the then newly released Windows Vista. Functionally, it works much like its predecessor Windows Mobile 5, but with improved stability.

== Features ==
Along with the announcement of Office Mobile 6.1 with support for Office 2007 document formats (pptx, docx, xlsx); OneNote Mobile, a companion to Microsoft Office OneNote was added to most builds of WM6. In addition to the newly included programs with Office Mobile, improvements were made to existing applications, such as HTML email support in Outlook Mobile. With Server Search on Microsoft Exchange 2007, Out of Office Replies with Microsoft Exchange 2007, and search ability for contacts in an Exchange Server Address Book being implemented. To aid development for programmers, .NET Compact Framework v2 SP2 is now preinstalled with the OS. Developers and users also have access to Microsoft SQL Server 2005 Compact Edition for storage and retrieval of information. AJAX, JavaScript, and XMLDOM support were added to Internet Explorer Mobile along with improved device wide Internet Sharing. Communication abilities were further enhanced with a new Microsoft Bluetooth Stack and VoIP (Internet calling) support with acoustic echo cancellation and MSRT Audio Codec.

To improve security, Microsoft added Storage Card Encryption so that encryption keys are lost if a device is cold-booted. Further updates, both security and feature wise, can now also be provided using Operating System Live Update

Among other improvements: 320x320 and 800x480 (WVGA) screen resolution support (The S01SH or "Em One" by Sharp was the first and only device to have a 800x480 screen on WM5), Improved Remote Desktop access (Available for only certain Pocket PCs), Customer Feedback option, Smartfilter for searching within programs and Unlicensed Mobile Access (UMA) support for select operators.

== See also ==
- Pocket PC 2000 – Version of the Windows Mobile operating system
- Pocket PC 2002 – Version of Windows Mobile, released in 2001
- Windows Mobile 2003 – Version of the Windows Mobile operating system
- Windows Mobile 5.0 – Version of Windows Mobile, released in 2005
- Windows Mobile 6.1 – Discontinued mobile operating system by Microsoft
- Windows Mobile 6.5 – Mobile operating system by Microsoft
