= Internet Explorer Mobile =

Mobile version of the Internet Explorer web browser by Microsoft

- Screenshot Internet Explorer Mobile 10 in Windows Phone 8 showing Wikipedia main page
- Developer: Microsoft
- Final release: 11.0 (February 10, 2014; 12 years ago) [±]
- Operating system: Windows CE, Windows Mobile, Windows Phone
- Type: Mobile browser
- License: Proprietary

Internet Explorer Mobile (formerly named Pocket Internet Explorer; later called IE Mobile) was a mobile version of Internet Explorer developed by Microsoft, based on versions of the MSHTML (Trident) layout engine. IE Mobile comes loaded by default with Windows Phone, Windows Mobile, and Windows CE. Later versions of Internet Explorer Mobile (since Windows Phone 8) are based on the desktop version of Internet Explorer. Older versions, however, called Pocket Internet Explorer (found on Windows Phone 7 and Windows Mobile), are not based on the same layout engine.

Internet Explorer Mobile 11, the last version supported, was based on the desktop version of Internet Explorer 11 and was available on Windows Phone 8.1. A new browser, Microsoft Edge [Legacy], replaced Internet Explorer Mobile in Windows 10 Mobile. Support for IE Mobile ended on all Microsoft operating systems on October 10, 2023, with the end of support for Windows Embedded Compact 2013.

== Features ==
The latest version of Internet Explorer Mobile includes tabbed browsing. The browser supports multi-touch gestures, including pinch-to-zoom as well as tap-to-zoom, although not the Touch API at present. Bing Search is tightly integrated with Internet Explorer Mobile. It can display websites in both "mobile" and "desktop" versions.

== Platforms ==
Internet Explorer Mobile 6 is included with Windows Mobile 6.5 and Zune HD. Internet Explorer Mobile 7 is included with Windows CE 7. Internet Explorer Mobile 9 is included with Windows Phone. Each version has the same MSHTML rendering engine as its desktop counterpart, but with additional improvements.

== Version history ==
=== Pocket Internet Explorer ===
==== Version 1 ====
Pocket Internet Explorer was first introduced in Windows CE 1.0, released in November 1996. It does not derive from the Internet Explorer code and was written from scratch for being as lightweight as possible. PIE 1.1 was later released, which supported cookies, HTTPS, and SSL.

==== Version 2 and 3 ====
Pocket Internet Explorer 2.0, released in September 1997 with Windows CE 2.0, added many new features: offline browsing, resizing images to fit to screen, and richer HTML support, including framesets and tables. PIE 3.0, introduced in July 1998 with Windows CE 2.10, added support for JScript and various secure protocols.

==== Version 4 ====
Pocket Internet Explorer 4 was the first to support ActiveX, CSS, VBScript, and further extended support for HTTPS and advanced HTML features. The Pocket PC 2002 version of PIE provided limited support for DHTML and XML, and also the ability to browse WAP sites – a feature not present in Internet Explorer for PC. Internet Explorer 6.0 added support for IFrames. The web browser supports FTP, XSLT, cookies and animated GIFs among other features.

=== Internet Explorer Mobile ===
==== Version 6 ====
Microsoft announced an updated version of Internet Explorer Mobile on April 1, 2008, alongside Windows Mobile 5.0, 6.0 and 6.1. It was described as "taking advantage of Internet Explorer 6 technologies," with promised support for H.265, Adobe Flash, and Microsoft Silverlight content. It would also support panning and zooming on pages designed for desktop browsers, similar to Safari on iPhone. The new update was shown running briefly during Microsoft's 2009 CES Keynote on a Palm Treo Pro, and later in an official video for Toshiba's TG01 phone.

Internet Explorer Mobile 6 was released as part of Windows Mobile 6.1.4, and some OEMs also installed it on Windows Mobile 6.1.4 Standard devices. New features include enhanced JavaScript and AJAX support (Jscript v5.7 from Internet Explorer 8) and support for Adobe Flash Lite 3.1. The browser also has a redesigned finger friendly Graphical user interface. Overall rendering quality and speed are also improved with this version; however according to Gizmodo and Engadget it didn't render pages as well as Opera Mobile and browsers based on Webkit.

==== Version 7 ====
On February 15, 2010, Microsoft unveiled its next-generation mobile operating system, Windows Phone. With it, came a new version of the Internet Explorer Mobile browser. New features for the browser included multi-touch gesture support, tabbed browsing, a new UI, smooth zoom-in/out animations, and a hybrid rendering engine combining the Internet Explorer 7 and Internet Explorer 8 desktop versions. According to Engadget and Gizmodo, rendering speed and quality has significantly improved and was now on par with those of competing mobile browsers based on WebKit.

==== Version 9 ====
At Mobile World Congress 2011 in February, 2011, Microsoft unveiled a major upgrade to Internet Explorer Mobile based on the rendering engine of Internet Explorer 9. Like its desktop counterpart, the browser features full hardware acceleration. Changes in this version included moving the address bar to the bottom of the screen and making it present in landscape orientation. Microsoft showed a number of HTML5 demonstrations for the browser. This is the last version supported on Windows Phone 7.

==== Version 10 ====
At the Windows Phone Developer Summit in June 2012, Microsoft revealed that the next version of Windows Phone, Windows Phone 8, would use the same web browsing engine as Windows 8 PCs and tablets. Internet Explorer Mobile 10 was intended to be faster and more secure, with anti-phishing features like SmartScreen Filter to block dangerous websites and malware. Sharing a core with Internet Explorer 10, Internet Explorer Mobile 10 supports a broader range of the HTML5 capabilities (including pointer events) and boosts applications/websites' performance. When it released, Internet Explorer Mobile 10 out-performed the Galaxy S III, HTC One S, and iPhone 4S on iOS 6 Beta in the SunSpider benchmark.

==== Version 11 ====
On July 15, 2014, Microsoft released Windows Phone 8.1, which includes the new Internet Explorer Mobile 11 browser. This version gets even closer to the desktop counterpart, by carrying over many of its improvements.

New features include:

- support for WebGL;
- normal mapping;
- InPrivate Browsing mode;
- Reading mode;
- the possibility to swipe left or right to navigate to the previous or next webpage;
- file upload;
- a new HTML5 video web player with support for inline playback and closed captions;
- Windows 8-style website live tiles;
- the ability to save passwords;
- the ability to open an unlimited number of tabs (previously the user could open up to six tabs).

Furthermore, the button to refresh the page is now placed on the address bar, and the open tabs can be displayed on other Microsoft devices besides the smartphone in use: if a user is logged in with a Microsoft account on both the Windows 8.1 and Windows Phone devices, tabs on Internet Explorer 11 will synchronize automatically.

==== Version 11 Update ====
Microsoft made several changes to Internet Explorer Mobile to make the browser more compatible with sites designed for mobile Safari (iOS) and Chrome (Android). To accomplish this, Microsoft adopted features from Safari and Chrome, emulated legacy WebKit features, and told web servers that it is iOS- or Android-compatible. The new version of Internet Explorer Mobile was released with Windows Phone 8.1 Update.

== Gallery ==
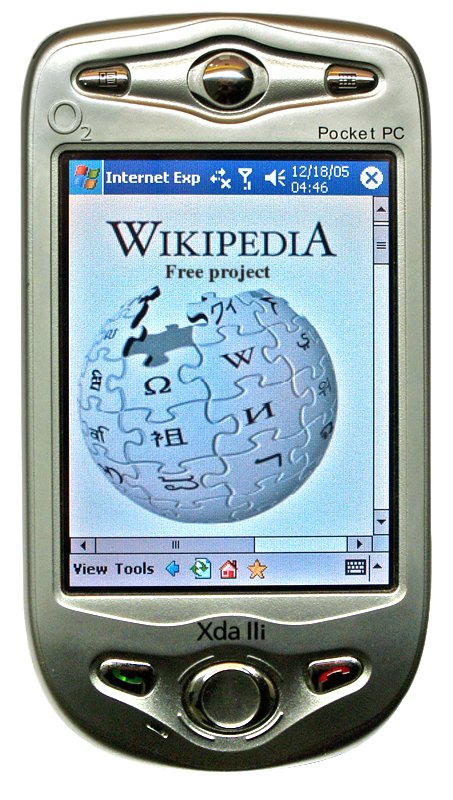
Pocket Internet Explorer on Windows Mobile 2003 SE

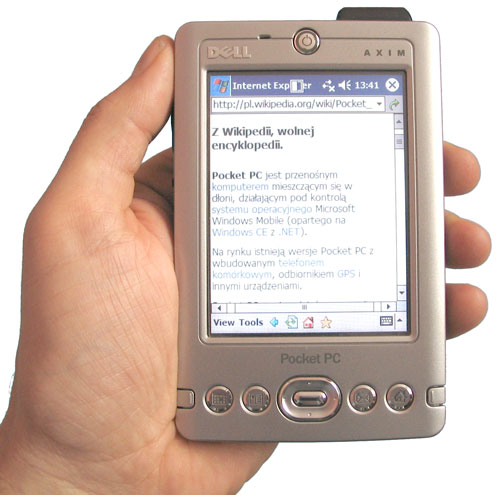
Pocket Internet Explorer running on the Dell Axim X30

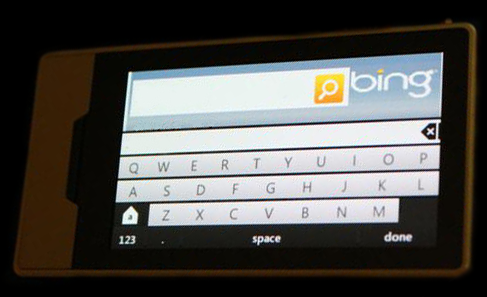
Internet Explorer Mobile 6 on Zune HD

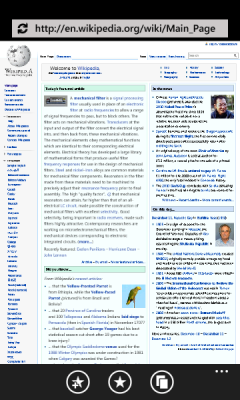
Internet Explorer Mobile 7 on Windows Phone 7.5

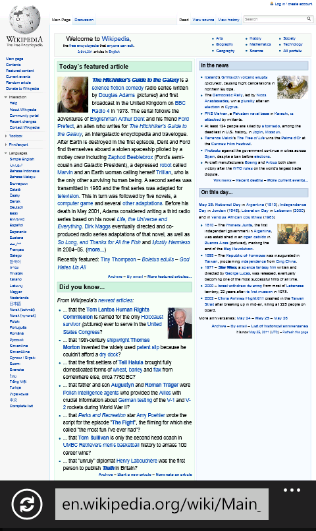
Internet Explorer Mobile 9 on Windows Phone 7.8

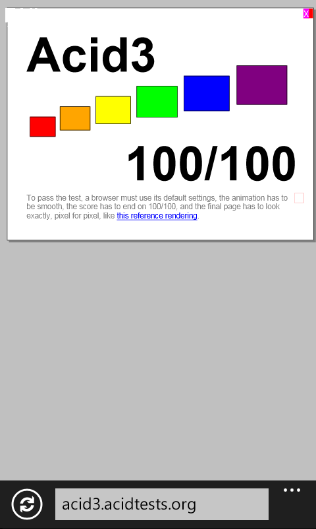
Acid3 shown on Internet Explorer Mobile v9.0

== See also ==
- Opera Mini – the browser in Microsoft Mobile's lower-end non-Windows phones
- Google Chrome for Android
- Google Chrome for iOS
- Mobile browser
- List of web browsers
- Comparison of web browsers
