= Windows Mobile 6.5 =

Mobile operating system by Microsoft

- Version of the Windows Mobile operating system

- Developer: Microsoft Corporation
- OS family: Microsoft Windows
- Working state: No longer supported
- Source model: Closed-source
- Released to manufacturing: May 11, 2009; 17 years ago
- Supported platforms: ARM
- Kernel type: Windows CE
- Preceded by: Windows Mobile 6.1
- Succeeded by: Windows Phone 7

Support status
- Unsupported as of January 8, 2013

Windows Mobile 6.5 is a version of Windows Mobile released on May 11, 2009 to manufacturers and October 6, 2009 to consumers. It was a stopgap revision to Windows Mobile 6.1, and includes some significant new added features such as a revamped Aero-based GUI, a new Today screen resembling that of Microsoft's Zune player with vertically scrollable labels (called 'Titanium'). WM6.5 also included the Internet Explorer Mobile 6 browser, with an improved interface. It was the final major operating system under the Windows Mobile brand as it was succeeded in 2010 by the revamped Windows Phone 7.

== History ==
Windows Mobile 6.5 was never part of Microsoft's original mobile phone roadmap, and has been described by its former chief executive Steve Ballmer as "not the full release Microsoft wanted" (which later became Windows Phone 7). Ballmer also indicated that the company "screwed up with Windows Mobile", lamenting that Windows Mobile 7 was not yet available and that the Windows Mobile team needed to try to recoup losses. Microsoft unveiled this version at the 2009 Mobile World Congress in February, and several devices were supplied with it. It was released to manufacturers on May 11, 2009; the first devices running the operating system appeared in late October 2009. Several phones that officially shipped with Windows Mobile 6.1 can be officially updated to Windows Mobile 6.5.

Along with Windows Mobile 6.5, Microsoft announced several cloud computing services codenamed "SkyBox", "SkyLine", "SkyMarket". "SkyBox" has been confirmed as My Phone, while "SkyMarket" has been confirmed to be Windows Marketplace for Mobile. This version was designed mainly for easier finger usage. Some reviewers have noted interface inconsistencies, with some applications having small buttons making them harder to operate using only a finger. Whilst this version of Windows Mobile does not natively support capacitive screens, mobile manufacturers have been able to use them on their devices.

== Updates ==
In the months following the release of Windows Mobile 6.5, development shifted from Windows Mobile to its successor Windows Phone. As such no major upgrades were planned or released, although three minor updates; 6.5.1, 6.5.3 and 6.5.5; were made to satisfy consumers during the transition period. 6.5.1 brings larger user interface elements, including icon based soft buttons (rather than text-based), an updated contacts app, native support for A-GPS, improved threaded text messaging, and performance improvements. It was unofficially ported to several Windows Mobile phones.

The second minor update was announced on February 2, 2010, along with the Sony Ericsson Aspen which was the first phone to use this version. 6.5.3 continues the trend of attempting to provide a more finger-friendly user interface with several new usability features such as native support for multitouch; although device maker HTC Corporation created proprietary workarounds to allow multi-touch to work on some applications it installed on its HD2 handset (However, Microsoft applications on this handset, such as the Internet Explorer web browser, did not support multi-touch.) and drag-and-drop start menu icons. Touchable tiles replaced soft keys. Internet Explorer Mobile 6 also received some major updates including decreased page load time, improved memory management and gesture smoothing. As with other updates it was unofficially ported to some other devices. Additional features include threaded email and Office Mobile 2010.

The last minor update and the last released version is 6.5.5. It first leaked in January 2010, and was unofficially ported to some Windows Mobile phones. The name Windows Mobile 6.5.5 has been applied to these newer builds, although this name remains unconfirmed by Microsoft.

== Reception ==
Windows Mobile 6.5 has received negative reviews. Gizmodo criticized it for being a superficial upgrade from Windows Mobile 6.1 and noted that it is "just not enough". TechCrunch described typing with the keyboard on the OS as an "absolute miserable chore" due to it being laggy and clunky.

== See also ==
- Pocket PC 2000 – Version of the Windows Mobile operating system
- Pocket PC 2002 – Version of Windows Mobile, released in 2001
- Windows Mobile 2003 – Version of the Windows Mobile operating system
- Windows Mobile 5.0 – Version of Windows Mobile, released in 2005
- Windows Mobile 6.0 – Discontinued mobile operating system by Microsoft
- Windows Mobile 6.1 – Discontinued mobile operating system by Microsoft
