= Windows Mobile 5.0 =

Version of Windows Mobile, released in 2005

- Version of the Windows Mobile operating system

- Today screen of Windows Mobile 5.0
- Developer: Microsoft Corporation
- Source model: Closed source
- Released to manufacturing: May 9, 2005; 20 years ago
- Kernel type: Windows CE
- Preceded by: Windows Mobile 2003
- Succeeded by: Windows Mobile 6.0

Support status
- Mainstream support: Ended on October 12, 2010; Extended support: Ended on October 13, 2015

Windows Mobile 5.0 is a mobile operating system developed by Microsoft. It was originally codenamed "Magneto". It was released at Microsoft's Mobile and Embedded Developers Conference 2005 in Las Vegas, May 9–12, 2005. Microsoft offered mainstream support for Windows Mobile 5 through October 12, 2010, and extended support through October 13, 2015. It was first offered on the Dell Axim x51.

It used the .NET Compact Framework 1.0 SP3, an environment for programs based on .NET. Windows Mobile 5.0 included Microsoft Exchange Server "push" functionality improvements that worked with Exchange 2003 SP2. The "push" functionality also required vendor/device support With AKU2 software upgrades all WM 5.0 devices supported DirectPush.

Windows Mobile 5.0 featured increased battery life due to Persistent storage capability. Previously up to 50% (enough for 72 hours of storage) of battery power was reserved just to maintain data in volatile RAM. This continued the trend of Windows-based devices moving from using RAM as their primary storage medium to the use of a combination of RAM and flash memory (in use, no distinction between the two is obvious to users). Programs and frequently accessed data run in RAM, while most storage is in the flash memory. The OS seamlessly moves data between the two as needed. Everything is backed up in the flash memory, so unlike prior devices, WM5 devices lose no data if power is lost. New to 5.0, OS updates were released as Adaptation kit upgrades, with AKU 3.5 being the final released.

== Features ==
A new version of Office was bundled called "Microsoft Office Mobile" which includes PowerPoint Mobile, Excel Mobile with graphing capability and Word Mobile with the ability to insert tables and graphics. Media management and playback was enhanced with Picture and Video package, which converged the management of videos and pictures and Windows Media Player 10 Mobile. Among new hardware features were enhanced Bluetooth support, default QWERTY keyboard-support and a management interface for Global Positioning System (GPS). Improvements were made to ActiveSync 4.2 with 15% increased synchronization speed. Business customers benefited from a new error reporting facility similar to that present in desktop and server Windows systems. Caller ID now supports photos so a user can apply an image to each contact to show when a call is received. DirectShow was also natively added. This release was the first to include DirectDraw with hardware acceleration, replacing the deprecated graphics component of GAPI, and Pocket MSN can be viewed directly from the Today Screen.

Windows Mobile 5.0 requires at least 64MB of RAM, and the device must run an ARM compatible processor such as the Intel XScale or the Samsung and Texas Instruments ARM compatibles.

Windows Mobile 5.0 was based on the Windows CE 5.0 kernel.

== See also ==
- Pocket PC 2000 – Version of the Windows Mobile operating system
- Pocket PC 2002 – Version of Windows Mobile, released in 2001
- Smartphone 2002 — Version of the Windows Mobile operating system
- Windows Mobile 2003 – Version of the Windows Mobile operating system
- Windows Mobile 6.0 – Discontinued mobile operating system by Microsoft
- Windows Mobile 6.1 – Discontinued mobile operating system by Microsoft
- Windows Mobile 6.5 – Mobile operating system by Microsoft
- Windows Phone 7 – First generation of Microsoft's Windows Phone mobile operating system
- Windows Phone 8 – Second generation of Microsoft's Windows Phone mobile operating system
- Windows Phone 8.1 – Third generation of Microsoft's Windows Phone mobile operating system
- Windows 10 Mobile – Mobile operating system developed by Microsoft
