= Ångström distribution =

Defunct Linux distribution

Ångström
- OS family: Linux (Unix-like)
- Working state: Unmaintained
- Source model: Open source
- Latest release: 2017.12 / December 30, 2017; 7 years ago
- Package manager: opkg
- Platforms: ARM
- Kernel type: Monolithic kernel
- Default user interface: Console, X Window System, GPE, OPIE
- License: Free software licenses (mainly GPL)
- Official website: angstrom-distribution.org at the Wayback Machine (archived 2008-04-01)

The Ångström distribution is a defunct Linux distribution for a variety of embedded devices. The distribution is the result of work by developers from the OpenZaurus, OpenEmbedded, and OpenSIMpad projects. The graphical user interfaces (GUIs) available are OPIE and GPE among other options.

The Ångström distribution is in "competition" with Poky Linux which is now part of the Yocto Project. Ångström is based on the OpenEmbedded project, specifically the OpenEmbedded-Core (OE-Core) layer. While both Ångström and Poky Linux are based on OE-Core, mostly utilize the same toolchain and are both officially "Yocto compatible", only Poky Linux is officially part of the Yocto Project.

Ångström primarily differs from Poky Linux in being a binary distribution (like e.g. the Debian, Fedora, OpenSuse or Ubuntu Linux distributions), using opkg for package management. Hence an essential part of Ångström builds is a binary package feed, allowing to simply install software distributed as opkg packages, without having to compile them first (just as one might install a binary package with aptitude or dpkg).

== Target platforms ==
According to the Ångström wiki, Ångström is being developed for at least the following devices:

- Sharp Zaurus:
  - SL-5500 (Collie)
  - SL-5600 (Poodle)
  - SL-6000 (Tosa)
  - SL-C7x0 (Corgi, Husky, Shepherd)
  - SL-C860 (Boxer)
  - SL-C1000 (Akita)
  - SL-C3xxx (Spitz, Borzoi, Terrier)
- Hewlett Packard iPAQ PDA
  - h2200
  - h4000
  - hx4700
  - h5000
- Nokia 770 Internet Tablet
- HTC Universal/iMate JasJar
- Motorola A780
- Psion Teklogix NetBook Pro
- Gumstix and Kouchuk-Bars
- Hawkboard
- BeagleBoard
- BeagleBone and BeagleBone Black
- PandaBoard
- OpenPandora
- OMAPEVM
- Base for Openmoko distribution
- Archos:
  - Archos 5
  - Archos 7
  - Archos 5 Internet Tablet
  - Archos 101
  - Archos 32
  - Archos 28
- Minnowboard
- Polyvision Roomwizard
- piA-AM335x
- 96Boards
  - Chameleon96

== See also ==
- Familiar Linux
- Openmoko
- OpenPandora
- OpenZaurus
- WebOS
- Pocket PC
- Windows Mobile
