= GPE Palmtop Environment =

Graphical user interface for mobile devices

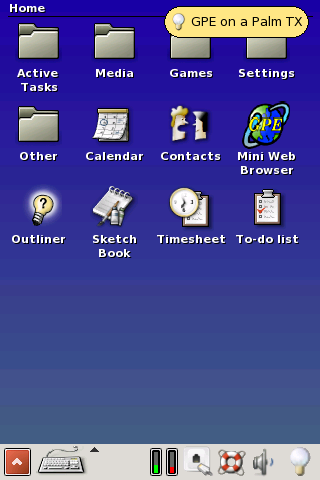
- Screenshot of GPE 2.8 on a Palm TX
- Final release: 2.8 / August 7, 2007
- Operating system: Linux
- Platform: Personal digital assistants
- Type: User interface
- License: GNU General Public License, GNU Lesser General Public License
- Website: gpe.linuxtogo.org

GPE (a recursive acronym for GPE Palmtop Environment) is a discontinued graphical user interface environment for handheld computers, such as palmtops and personal digital assistants (PDAs), running some Linux kernel-based operating system. GPE is a complete environment of software components and applications which makes it possible to use a Linux handheld for tasks such as personal information management (PIM), audio playback, email, and web browsing.

GPE is free and open-source software, subject to the terms of the GNU General Public License (GPL) or the GNU Lesser General Public License (LGPL).

== Supported devices ==
GPE is bundled with embedded Linux distributions targeting the following platforms:

- Sharp Zaurus
- Hewlett-Packard iPAQ
- Hewlett-Packard Jornada 72x
- Siemens SIMpad SL4

In addition, GPE maintainers and the open source community are developing ports for additional devices:

- GamePark Holdings GP2x
- Nokia 770
- Nokia N800
- Palm TX
- Palm Treo 650
- HTC Universal
- HTC Typhoon
- HTC Tornado
- HTC Wizard
- HTC Apache

On February 5, 2007, The GPE project announced GPE Phone Edition, a new variant of GPE developed for mobile phones.

== Software components ==
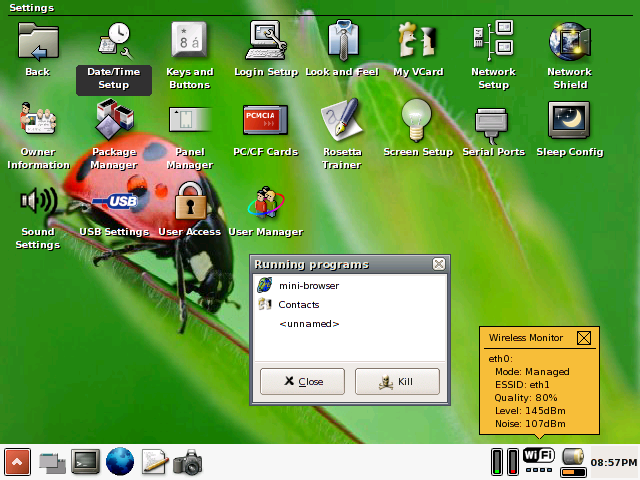
GPE on a Sharp Zaurus C1000

GPE does not have any of the GNOME Core Applications, but instead software was written from scratch, tailored to the embedded environment. GPE is based on GTK+, and because GTK+ did not gain support for Wayland until versions 3.10, GPE uses X11 as its windowing system, e.g. with the combination X.Org Server/Matchbox.

The project provides an infrastructure for application development by providing core software such as shared libraries, database schemata, and building on available technology including SQLite, D-BUS, GStreamer and several of the more common standards defined by freedesktop.org.

One of the major goals of the GPE project is to encourage people to work on free software for mobile devices and to experiment with writing a GUI for embedded devices. Some of the applications already developed for GPE include:

- GPE-Contacts - A contacts manager
- GPE-Calendar - The calendar application
- GPE-Edit - A simple text editor
- GPE-Filemanager - A file manager with MIME type and remote access support
- GPE-Gallery - Small and easy to use image viewer
- GPE-Games - A small collection of tiny games
- GPE-Mini-Browser - A CSS and JavaScript compatible compact web browser
- GPE-Sketchbook - Create notes and sketches
- GPE-Soundbite - A voice memo tool
- GPE-ToDo - A task list manager
- GPE-Timesheet - Track time spend on tasks
- Starling - A GStreamer based audio player

GPE's PIM applications (GPE-Contacts, GPE-Calendar, GPE-ToDo) can be synchronized with their desktop and web counterparts (such as Novell Evolution, Mozilla Sunbird and Google Calendar) through the use of GPE-Syncd and the OpenSync framework.

GPE also contains a number of GUI utilities for configuring 802.11 Wireless LAN, Bluetooth, IrDA, Firewall, ALSA, Package Management, among others.

A mobile push e-mail client based on the Tinymail framework is in development.

== Linux distributions ==
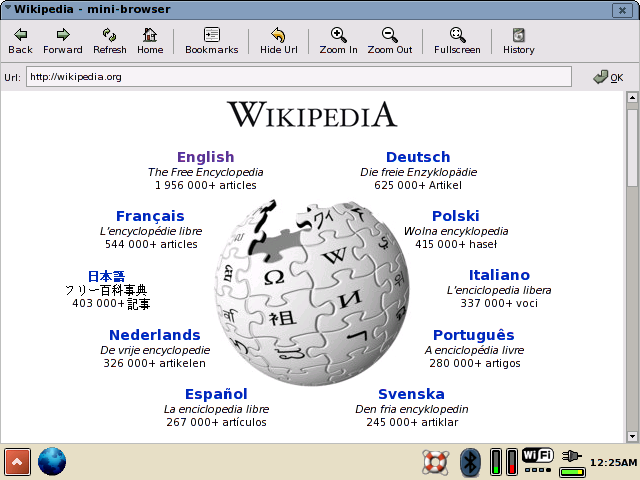
Wikipedia viewed with the GPE Mini-Browser

GPE can be found as a primary environment in the following embedded Linux distributions:

- OpenEmbedded (ex OpenZaurus)
- Ångström
- Familiar Linux

Though it may not be as highly supported as the distributions listed above, GPE is also available through package management utilities in the following distributions:

- Ubuntu
- Debian
- Internet Tablet OS

== Controversy ==
There are ongoing controversies surrounding the GPE project regarding a change of hosting service, ownership of an IRC channel, and a trademark dispute.

=== Web hosting ===
Serious issues first began developing over a proposed change of hosting service. GPE had been hosted at Handhelds.org since April 2002. Some of GPE's developers suggested, and later followed through with, a move to Linuxtogo.org by October 2006. Handhelds.org responded by removing the user accounts of the departing developers, and any links or reference to the new GPE Linuxtogo.org location on the original GPE Handhelds.org site.

=== Trademark ===
George France, has filed for trademark registration with the USPTO for GPE, in addition to OPIE and Ipkg as of March 6, 2007. On June 25, 2007, the USPTO declined to accept a screenshot of the Handhelds.org GPE website as proof of Handhelds.org's ownership, and in addition requested a better specimen for a “GPE product”. Handhelds.org, and OSI board member Russ Nelson, assert that the GPE project was given over to Handhelds.org for public development.

The GPE developers working at Linuxtogo.org maintain that they represent the active GPE project, and Handhelds.org was only a hosting provider. Furthermore, they point out that the GPE project existed before it was hosted on Handhelds.org.

The USPTO issued a final rejection regarding the GPE trademark on February 27, 2008. George France amended the application (removing references to GNU and Linux). The GPE trademark was officially published for opposition June 3, 2008.

Despite George France's impending personal GPE trademark, the core GPE development team at Linuxtogo.org has abandoned much of the Handhelds.org GPE infrastructure. Linuxtogo.org developers have switched GPE to a new bootloader and replaced IPKG with OPKG, and made major changes to the GPE gui applications.

The Trademark of GPE was registered to George France on Aug 19, 2008 by the USPTO.

== See also ==
- Palm OS
- Pocket PC
- Qt Extended
- Windows Mobile
