= OpenZaurus =

Linux distribution

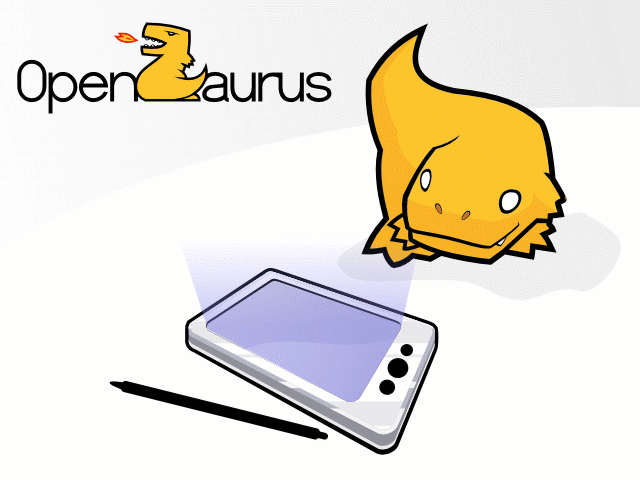
- OS family: Linux (Unix-like)
- Source model: Open source
- Latest release: 3.5.4.1 / July 6, 2006
- Latest preview: 3.5.4.2-rc2 / September 2, 2006
- Package manager: ipkg
- Supported platforms: ARM
- Kernel type: Monolithic Linux kernel
- Default user interface: Console, X Window System, GPE, OPIE
- License: GNU GPL
- Official website: OFFLINE www.openzaurus.org Archived March 30, 2002, at the Wayback Machine

OpenZaurus is a defunct embedded operating system for the Sharp Zaurus personal mobile tool PDA.

== History ==
In its original form, the project was a repackaging of the SharpROM, the Zaurus's factory supplied kernel and root filesystem image. In order to make the Zaurus's OS closer to the needs of the developer community, the SharpROM was altered through the use of bugfixes, software additions, and even removals in order to make the package more open.

The OpenZaurus project was revamped completely, becoming Debian-based built from source, from the ground up. Due to the change in direction, OpenZaurus became quite similar to other embedded Debian-based distributions, such as Familiar for the iPAQ. OpenZaurus, in its current form, facilitates an easy method for users to build their own custom images. The efforts of OpenZaurus, along with other embedded Linux projects, were integrated into the OpenEmbedded Project, which now provides the common framework for these projects.

== Variants ==
In addition to building a custom OpenZaurus image using OpenEmbedded metadata, the OpenZaurus distribution can be acquired in three variations for each version release.

- Bootstrap: A minimal, console based image with a working root filesystem, and networking over SSH, WLAN, Bluetooth, or USB. Suitable for bootstrapping a larger, X11 system.
- GPE: Everything the Bootstrap image contains, plus the X Window System and the GTK+ based GPE Palmtop Environment.
- OPIE: Everything the Bootstrap image contains and the Qt based OPIE Palmtop Integrated Environment.

== Status ==
On April 26, 2007, it was announced that the OpenZaurus project was over. Future development efforts are to focus on the Ångström distribution for embedded systems.

== See also ==
- Palm OS
- Pocket PC
- Windows Mobile
