= Archos 5 =

The short term Archos 5 might mean:

- the Archos Generation 6 based Archos 5 Internet Media Tablet
- the Archos Generation 7 based Archos 5 Internet Tablet
