= Openmoko Linux =

Mobile operating system

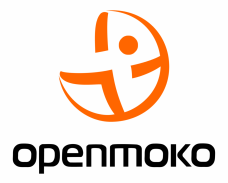
- Developer: The Openmoko Team
- OS family: Linux (Unix-like)
- Source model: Open source
- Marketing target: Smartphones
- Kernel type: Linux kernel
- Default user interface: Graphical user interface
- License: GNU General Public License
- Official website: www.openmoko.org

Openmoko Linux is an operating system for smartphones developed by the Openmoko project. It is based on the Ångström distribution, comprising various pieces of free software.

The main targets of Openmoko Linux were the Openmoko Neo 1973 and the Neo FreeRunner. Furthermore, there were efforts to port the system to other mobile phones.

Openmoko Linux was developed from 2007 to 2009 by Openmoko Inc. The development was discontinued because of financial problems. Afterwards the development of software for the Openmoko phones was taken over by the community and continued in various projects, including SHR, QtMoko and Hackable1.

== Components ==
Openmoko Linux uses the Linux kernel, GNU libc, the X.Org Server plus their own graphical user environment built using the EFL toolkit, GTK+ toolkit, Qt toolkit and the illume window manager (previously Matchbox window manager). The OpenEmbedded build framework and opkg package management system, are used to create and maintain software packages.

This is a very different approach than that of Android (in which everything except Linux, Webkit, and the Java language inside of Android seems non-standard). Applications targeted for Android must be substantially rewritten and are largely not portable. Many existing Linux desktop apps can be easily ported to Openmoko. (However the limited computational power and screen resolution require substantial reworking of existing applications, in order to render them usable in a finger-oriented, small-screen environment.)

== See also ==
- List of free and open source Android applications
