= XMDF (e-book format) =

ever-eXtending Mobile Document Format (XMDF)
- Initial release: 1999
- Type of format: e-book file format

XMDF (ever-eXtending Mobile Document Format) is a file format for viewing electronic books. It was originally developed by Sharp Corporation for its Zaurus platform. It is primarily used in Japan.
