= Openmoko =

Discontinued project to create a family of open source mobile phones

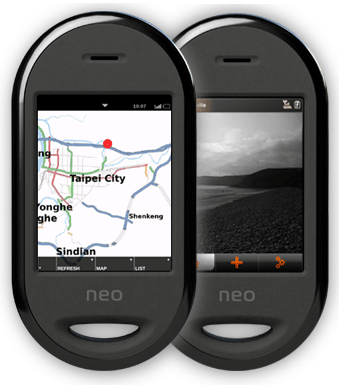
Neo FreeRunner, an open source smartphone created by the Openmoko project.

Openmoko is a discontinued project to create a family of mobile phones that are open source, including the hardware specification, the operating system (Openmoko Linux), and actual smartphone development implementation like the Neo 1973 and Neo FreeRunner. The whole project was sponsored by Openmoko Inc.

The first sub-project was Openmoko Linux, a Linux-based operating system designed for mobile phones, built using free software.

The second sub-project was developing hardware devices on which Openmoko Linux runs. The first device released was the Neo 1973, in 2007, which was followed up by the Neo FreeRunner on 25 June 2008. On 2 April 2009, Openmoko suspended development of their third device, codenamed GTA03, to focus on the FreeRunner. In 2010, development of the GTA03 was continued by Golden Delicious Computers under the new codename GTA04, which includes major hardware revision, and the first unit was shipped on 10 October 2011. Unlike most other mobile phone platforms, these phones are designed to provide end users with the ability to modify the operating system and software stack. Other Openmoko-supported phones are also available.

== History ==
Project Openmoko was announced 7 November 2006 by its founders First International Computer (FIC). The Initial core team for Openmoko project included Werner Almesberger, Michael Lauer, Sean Moss-Pultz and Harald Welte.

== Etymology ==
The name Openmoko is an acronym for Open Mobile Kommunikations.

The codename for the phone product series, GTA, is an abbreviation of "GSM-TI-AGPS" which indicates the main components of the phone.

== Software ==
Originally Openmoko Inc. developed its own operating system for the phones, which was called Openmoko Linux or Om. It uses the Linux kernel, together with a graphical user environment built using the X.Org Server. The OpenEmbedded build framework and opkg package system were used to create and maintain software packages. The initial version named Om 2007 used the GTK+ toolkit and the Matchbox window manager. Om 2008, which was released in August 2008, added support for the Qt toolkit and Enlightenment 17. Despite continuous improvements both of these versions did not reach a stable state. As a result, Openmoko started developing Om 2009, which had the goal of providing a stable environment based on the middleware from freesmartphone.org, a project that was financed by Openmoko. However, this version was not finished either, and in April 2009 Openmoko cancelled the development of software.

This task was taken over by several efforts of the community. Several groups have created modified versions of the original software or ported other systems to work on the phones. Among others, the Openmoko phones now support Android, Debian, Gentoo, Qt Extended Improved, QtMoko, and SHR.

== Openmoko Inc. based hardware ==
Neo 1973
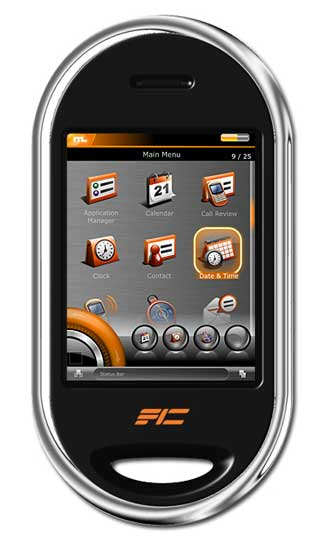
- Manufacturer: FIC
- Type: smartphone
- Released: 9 July 2007
- Media: microSD, SDHC capable
- Operating system: Openmoko Linux, Qtopia (both Linux-based)
- CPU: Samsung s3c2410 SoC @ 266 MHz
- Memory: 128 MB SDRAM; 64 MB NAND flash
- Display: 2.8 in. VGA (480×640) TFT, 282 pixels/in.
- Input: touchscreen buttons
- Connectivity: GSM; GPRS; Bluetooth 2.0; AGPS; USB 1.1 slave and host 2.5-mm audio jack
- Power: 1200-mAh removable battery
- Dimensions: 120.7 × 62 × 18.5 (mm)
- Successor: Neo FreeRunner

Openmoko hardware aspires to the term open-source hardware although in various areas the availability of cell phone components and legal requirements prevent full conformance to this term.

As do many other vendors, Openmoko Inc., notoriously failed to meet the publicly announced hardware release dates, and postponed releases many times.

The first supported phone, the Neo 1973 GTA01 (version: Bv4), was distributed exclusively through openmoko.com from July 2007 to February 2008.

The second revision of hardware based on the GTA01 design is the Dash Express, an automotive navigation system. The Dash Express has a faster CPU (Samsung 2440) and Wi-Fi ability.

The third hardware platform, the Neo FreeRunner codenamed GTA02 is an improved version of the Neo 1973.

Both the Neo 1973 and the Neo FreeRunner lack an integrated camera.

=== Neo 1973 ===
The Neo 1973 (codenamed GTA01) phone was a "developers only" release. The device is named after the first year of cellular telephone communication: the inventor of the cellular phone, Martin Cooper, made the first call in 1973. The phone released was inconsistently-named Neo 1973 or Neo1973. The Neo 1973 was sold from 9 July 2007 to February 2008. It was priced at US$300 for the basic model, or US$450 for a kit including more tools for hardware work.

The initial releases of the Neo 1973 were hampered by supplier shortages, which forced the shipping date to slip, and hardware development difficulties exacerbated by the small size of the core team. Furthermore, other platforms have been ported to the Neo 1973, including Qt Extended, Debian and Android.

The phone supports the 900 MHz, 1800 MHz and 1900 MHz GSM frequency bands. Many Linux and Unix programs used on desktop and server platforms, including utilities and games, have been successfully run on the phone. In addition to Linux, the NetBSD, FreeBSD and L4 kernels have been adapted by users to run on the platform or are under development.

This hardware platform can be emulated in software with a high level of compatibility using a version of QEMU included in the Openmoko software suite.

==== Release under Creative Commons license ====
Shortly before the shipping of the successor, the Neo Freerunner, the OpenMoko project released the CAD files, the schematics and other development resources of the Neo 1973 and Freerunner under a Creative Commons license, the CC BY-SA 3.0. The schematics are available for download from OpenMoko and Wikimedia Commons under a Creative Commons Attribution ShareAlike license.

=== Neo FreeRunner ===
Neo FreeRunner
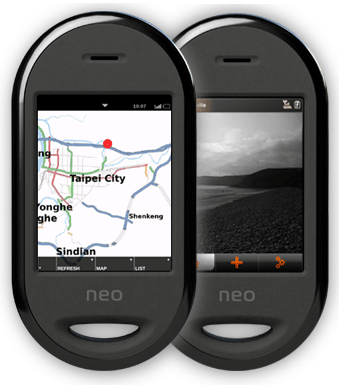
- Manufacturer: FIC
- Type: Smartphone
- Released: 3 July 2008
- Units sold: 10,000 (2009)
- Media: microSD, SDHC capable Wolfson WM8753 Codec
- Operating system: Openmoko Linux, Qt Extended, Debian, Stable Hybrid Release, Android, Gentoo (all Linux-based), Inferno
- CPU: Samsung S3C2442 SoC @ 400 MHz
- Memory: 128 MB SDRAM; 256 MB NAND flash
- Display: 2.8 in. VGA (480×640) TFT, 286 pixels/in.
- Input: touchscreen 2 hardware buttons
- Connectivity: GSM; Bluetooth 2.0; GPRS; AGPS; WiFi (802.11 b/g); USB 1.1 slave and host 2.5-mm audio jack
- Power: 4.4 Wh (1200 mAh @ 3.7V) removable battery
- Dimensions: 120.7 × 62 × 18.5 (mm)

The Neo FreeRunner (codenamed GTA02) was the successor to the Neo 1973. The changes include a faster processor (clocked at 400 MHz), 802.11b/g Wi-Fi, two accelerometers and 3D graphics acceleration. It was released for the mass market on 25 June 2008. It was intended for users with a high demand for customizability.

The Neo FreeRunner started shipping on 24 June 2008 and was priced individually at US$250 and at US$200 each if purchased in multiples of five. A debug board is available for US$99.

The Neo FreeRunner includes features that were not present in the development release of the phone (Neo 1973). The changes include 802.11 b/g Wi-Fi, SMedia 3362 graphics accelerator, two 3D accelerometers, Samsung 2442 SoC, and 256 MB of flash memory.

==== Functionality ====
As of the 2008.08 software revision only the GSM phone module is working reliably; the Freerunner's hardware does not yet have fully functional software interfaces. The software development is split between Qtopia under X11, GTK+, FSO, Debian. There are also some derivates of the Openmoko main distribution SHR and FDOM (Fat and Dirty Openmoko). The vanilla Qtopia distribution is recommended by Openmoko for users not wishing to use early development stage software, and FDOM for those who want to test the latest features and fixes without worrying about stability.

It is also possible to run Inferno on OpenMoko Neo FreeRunner.

Android has been patched to run on the OpenMoko Neo FreeRunner by at least two different developers.

OpenWrt can be compiled for the Neo FreeRunner.

==== In media ====
The Neo FreeRunner makes an appearance in William Gibson's 2010 novel Zero History, as the phone initially used by the character Milgrim.

=== Dash Express ===
On 2 January 2008 the Dash Express, a GPS device, with hardware developed by Openmoko Inc. was announced running Openmoko Linux. This device, initially codenamed the HXD8, seems to use little or none of the openmoko user-interface, simply using patches to the kernel developed by Openmoko Inc, and running an application from Dash Navigation on it to provide navigation and a user interface.

=== 3D7K ===
There is a lack of reference material for what happened to the GTA03 (codename of 3D7K). Openmoko built 3 working prototypes which had capacitive touchscreens and a fully transparent curved case .

=== WikiReader ===
The latest product from Openmoko Inc. was the WikiReader, a device to read Wikipedia articles offline.

== Golden Delicious based hardware ==
The German engineering firm "Golden Delicious Computers" began producing the GTA04 with an 800 MHz ARM Cortex-A8 (1 GHz) processor, an 800 MHz C64x+ DSP (digital signal processor) core, and a 3D graphics accelerator.

With those specifications and the 512 MB RAM combined with 512 MB NAND flash and 32 GB expandable microSDHC, it would have been similar in performance to the iPhone 4 and iPhone 4S.

=== Golden Delicious GTA04 board ===
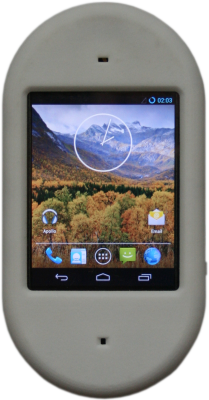
The GTA04 running Replicant.

Golden Delicious GTA04 board is designed to exchange the GTA02 board in the Neo FreeRunner housing - and the GTA01 board in the Neo 1973 housing.

This was a release of the Openmoko Beagle Hybrid, a platform using the BeagleBoard as a basis for developing and prototyping a next generation Openmoko phone. The following month, Golden Delicious stated their long-term goal of bringing such a phone to market. The new GTA04 board fit into the Neo Freerunner case and connected to the existing display and other components. The first batch of GTA04A3 EA (early adopter) started shipping on 10 October 2011. Version GTA04A4 first batch started shipping on 31 January 2012. The design for the next revision, GTA04A5, contained some minor but relevant upgrades in design and parts, and replacement of end-of-life components. The production was crowd funded.

It is also possible to order a ready made phone called OpenPhoenux or GTA04 Complete.

Hardware:

- CPU: ARM Cortex A8 with 1000 MHz
- Memory: 512 MB RAM / 1024 MB NAND
- Interconnect: WiFi, WLAN, Bluetooth
- WLAN: UMTS module with 3.75G (up to 14.4 Mbit/s)
- Sensors (Barometer, Compass, Gyroscope, Accelerometer)
- GPS
- USB OTG 2.0
- connector for optional camera module
- well-documented building blocks so user allowed to write their own boot loaders and kernels.

== See also ==
- Android (operating system)
- Comparison of open source software hosting facilities
- Greenphone
- LiMo Foundation
- Linux Phone Standards Forum
- List of open source mobile phones
- Maemo
- MeeGo
- Mobilinux
- Modular smartphone
  - Project Ara – Open hardware modular smartphone project
- Open Handset Alliance
- Open Mobile Alliance
- OpenBTS, OSS base station software
- OsmocomBB, OSS client GSM firmware
- Replicant (operating system)
- SHR (Stable Hybrid Release)
- Qt Extended
