= Agenda VR3 =

Personal digital assistant released in 2001

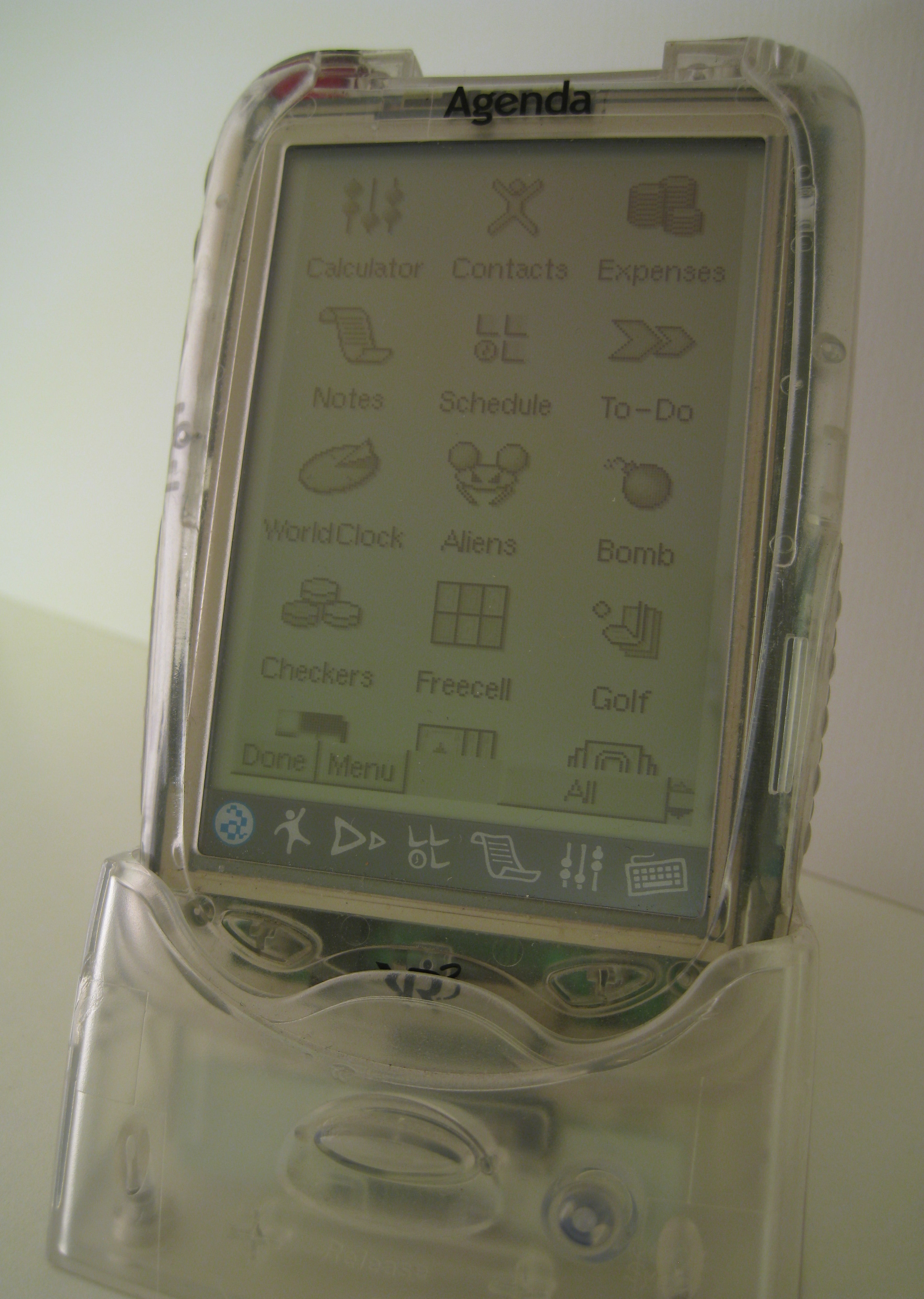
An Agenda VR3, in "clear" color, on its docking stand

The Agenda VR3 was the name of the first "pure Linux" personal digital assistant (PDA), released in May 2001 by Agenda Computing, Inc. of Irvine, California. The Linux Documentation Project considers the VR3 to be a "true Linux PDA" because the manufacturers installed Linux-based operating systems on them by default.

== History ==
The VR3 was unveiled at LinuxWorld Conference and Expo in August 2000 by Agenda Computing, which was at the time "a wholly owned subsidiary of the publicly traded electronics manufacturing giant, Kessel International Holdings, based in Hong Kong." A developer model, the VR3d, was available by December.

By late 2001, the VR3's price dropped from $249 to $119 at some US retailers, which caused some to wonder whether the promised VR5 (a color handheld) was to be released, or Agenda Computing was closing shop.

In April 2002, after the demise of Agenda Computing, the Softfield Vr3 became available from Softfield Technologies of Toronto, Ontario, Canada. As of July 2008, the device is still available from SoftField.

== Hardware ==
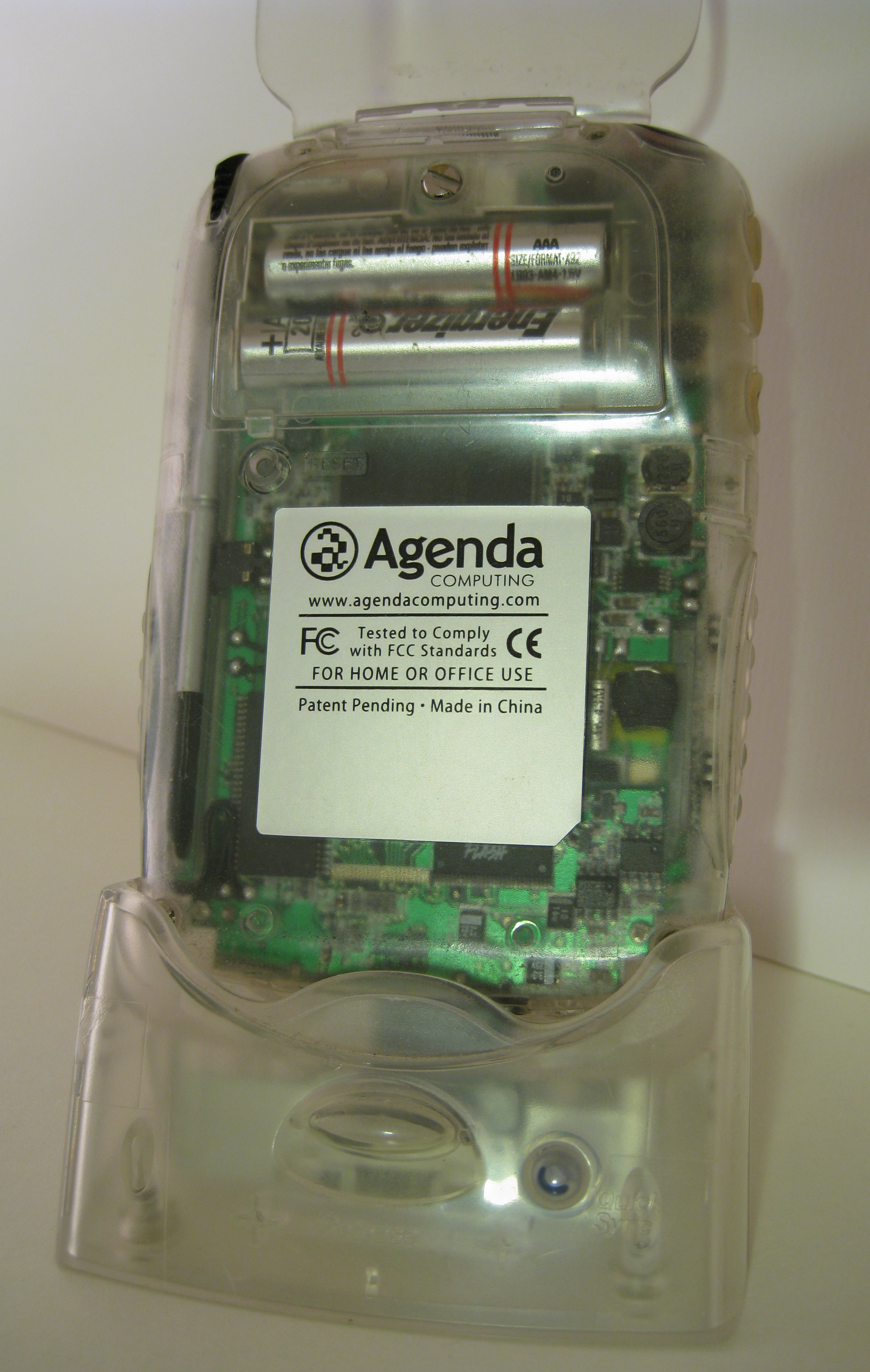
Back of an Agenda VR3

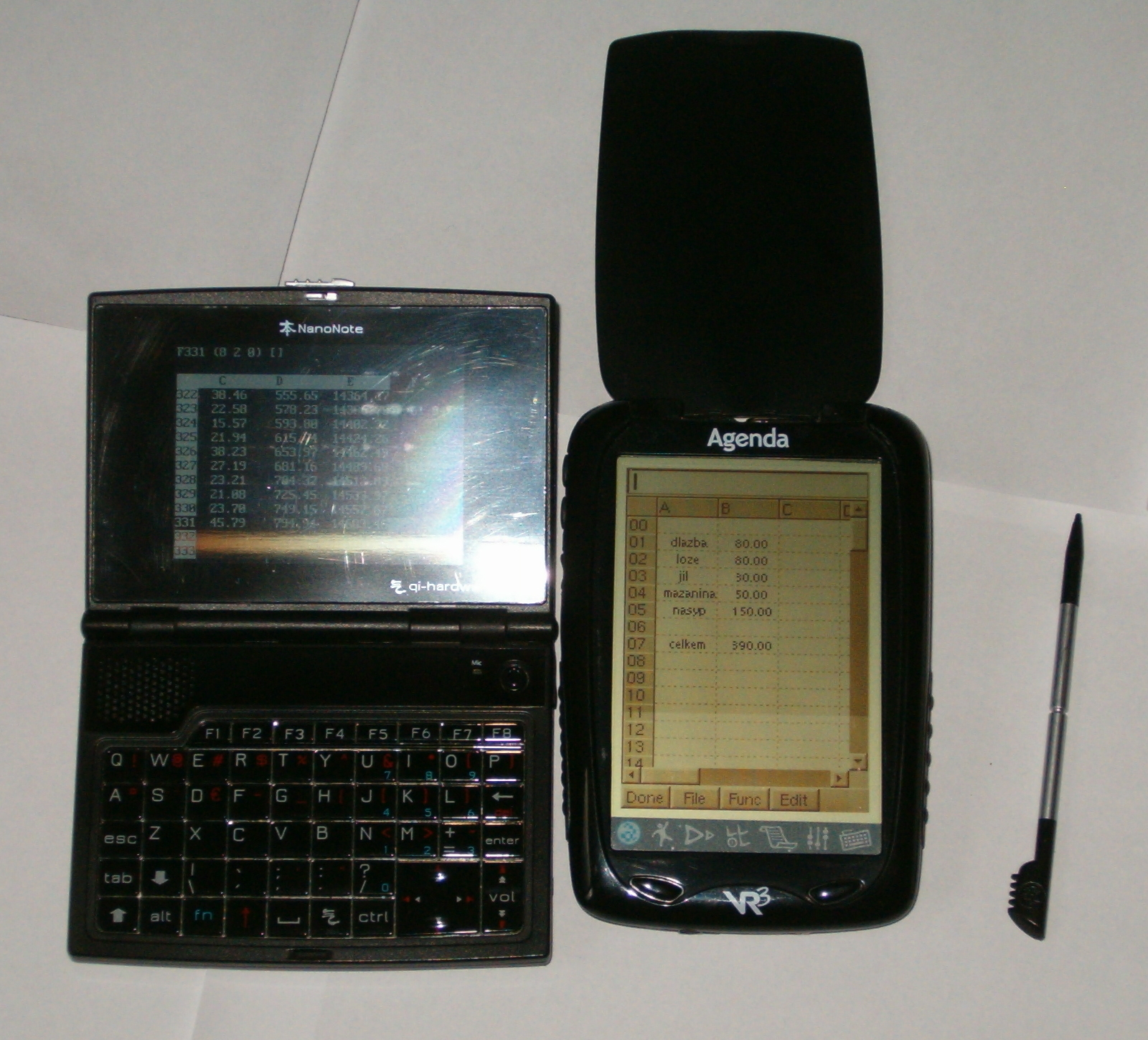
Ben NanoNote next to a black Agenda VR3

The VR3 was 4.5"×3.0"×0.8". It included a 2.25"×3.25", 160×240 pixel, monochrome, backlit LCD touchscreen. It utilized a 66MHz MIPS CPU with 8MB of RAM and 16MB of built-in Flash memory for storage.

For input, it included push buttons for actions (such as Page-Up and Down, and Left and Right), stylus-activated power on/off, on-screen hard buttons for launching applications and a built-in microphone jack.

It also included a notification buzzer, an LED notification light, an IrDA port and an RS-232 port. It was powered by two AAA batteries, and connected to PCs via an RS-232 cable, or a docking station that the cable connected to. Both contained a button for activating sync software.

== Software ==
The VR3 came with a 2.4.0 version of the Linux kernel, XFree86, the Rxvt terminal emulator, the Bash shell, and a user interface based on the FLTK GUI library. It included on-screen keyboard and handwriting recognition software, a number of personal information management (PIM) applications (including an expense tracker, e-mail, to-do list, contacts list, and schedule), games, and other tools. Several games were also included, including card games and clones of Space Invaders and Tetris.

It is possible to telnet, FTP and make remote X connections to the device.

Numerous applications were created by third-party developers, with the Agenda Software Repository listing nearly 200 titles by the end of 2003. Several open-source video games were produced by New Breed Software, Karl Bartel, Dhiraj Gaurh, Delorie Software, and others. Several of whom would also support the Sharp Zaurus PDA which also ran Linux.
