= Greenphone =

Smartphone

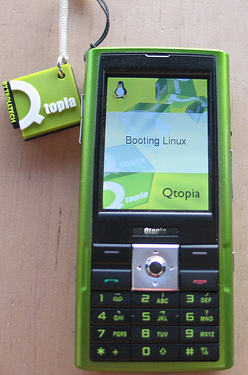
- Manufacturer: Yuhua Teltech for Trolltech
- Type: Smartphone
- First released: September 2006; 20 years ago
- Discontinued: October 2007
- Dimensions: 106.5 × 49.0 × 15.6 (mm)
- Operating system: Qtopia Phone Edition (Linux-based)
- CPU: Intel XScale @ 312 MHz
- Memory: 64 MB SDRAM; 128 MB NAND Flash
- Removable storage: miniSD
- Battery: Battery
- Display: 240×320 QVGA TFT
- Connectivity: GSM; Bluetooth; GPRS; USB 1.1; 2.5-mm audio jack
- Data inputs: Touchscreen, buttons

The Greenphone was a smartphone developed by Trolltech with Qtopia Phone Edition, a GUI and application platform embedded in Linux using mostly free and open source software.

The proprietary software on the phone includes the communications stack and the package manager. However, Trolltech put these components under GPL in version 4.3 of Qtopia, making it possible to run the Greenphone with no proprietary components by updating its software to Qtopia 4.3.

On October 22, 2007, Trolltech announced that it had sold all inventory of Greenphones and would no longer continue production, having achieved its goal of promoting the Qtopia platform and gaining interest from developers. Focus was shifted to developing the Neo FreeRunner phone. Trolltech intends to continue supporting the Qtopia Greenphone community, and alternative hardware, such as the Neo 1973.

The Greenphone was named after Robert Green, an employee of Trolltech at the time, who jokingly suggested it when the company was having trouble agreeing on a name for the phone.

== See also ==
- Android (operating system), developed by Google
- FIC Neo 1973 a smartphone developed by Openmoko
- Openmoko, which can also run Qtopia
- Qtopia
