= Sharp Zaurus =

Series Of PDAs Produced Between 1993 And 2008

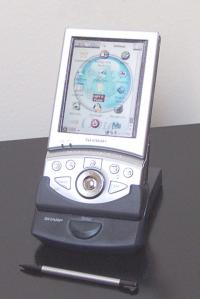
Sharp Zaurus SL-5500 running OpenZaurus and OPIE, with docking cradle and stylus

Sharp Zaurus is a series of personal digital assistants (PDAs) made by Sharp Corporation. The Zaurus was the most popular PDA during the 1990s in Japan and was based on a proprietary operating system. The first Sharp PDA to use the Linux operating system was the SL-5000D, running the Qtopia-based Embedix Plus. The Linux Documentation Project considers the Zaurus series to be "true Linux PDAs" because their manufacturers install Linux-based operating systems on them by default. The name derives from the common suffix applied to the names of dinosaurs.

== History ==
In September 1993, Sharp introduced the PI-3000, the first in the Zaurus line of PDAs, as a follow-on to Sharp's earlier Wizard line of PDAs (the Wizard also influenced Apple's Newton). Featuring a black and white LCD screen, handwriting recognition, and optical communication capabilities among its features, the Zaurus soon became one of Sharp's best selling products.

The PI-4000, released in 1994, expanded the Zaurus' features with a built-in modem and facsimile functions. This was succeeded in 1995 by the PI-5000, which had e-mail and mobile phone interfaces, as well as PC linking capability. The Zaurus K-PDA was the first Zaurus to have a built-in keyboard in addition to handwriting recognition; the PI-6000 and PI-7000 brought in additional improvements.

In 1996 Sharp introduced the Sharp Zaurus ZR-5800. It used the same compact design, ports and pointing device as the previous Zaurus models. The changes were mostly in the ROM. It came with 2 MB RAM and a backlit 320x240 LCD.

During this time, Sharp was making significant advances in color LCD technology. In May 1996, the first color Zaurus was released; the MI-10 and MI-10DC were equipped with a five-inch (12.7 cm) color thin-film transistor (TFT) LCD screen. This model had the ability to connect to the internet, and had a built-in camera and audio recorder. Later that year, Sharp developed a forty-inch (100 cm) TFT LCD screen, the world's largest at the time. In December, the MI-10/10DC Zaurus was chosen as the year's best product by Information Display Magazine in the United States.

Sharp continued to make advancements in display technology; the Zaurus gained additional multimedia capabilities, such as video playback, with the introduction of the MI-E1 in Japan in November 2000. The MI-E1 was also the first Zaurus to support both Secure Digital and Compact Flash memory cards, a feature which would become standard on future models as well.

Although the MI series sold well in Japan, it was never released in either the USA or Europe, and the Japanese user interface was never translated into any other language. The machines released outside Japan were the Linux based SL series, the first of which was the SL-5000D "developer edition". This was shortly followed by the SL-5500; both used 'Embedix' - an embedded version of the Linux operating system developed by Lineo - combined with Qtopia, the Qt toolkit-based embedded application environment developed by Trolltech.

The development of the MI series in Japan was continued for a while, but the MI-E25DC has been officially declared to be the last MI-Series Zaurus.

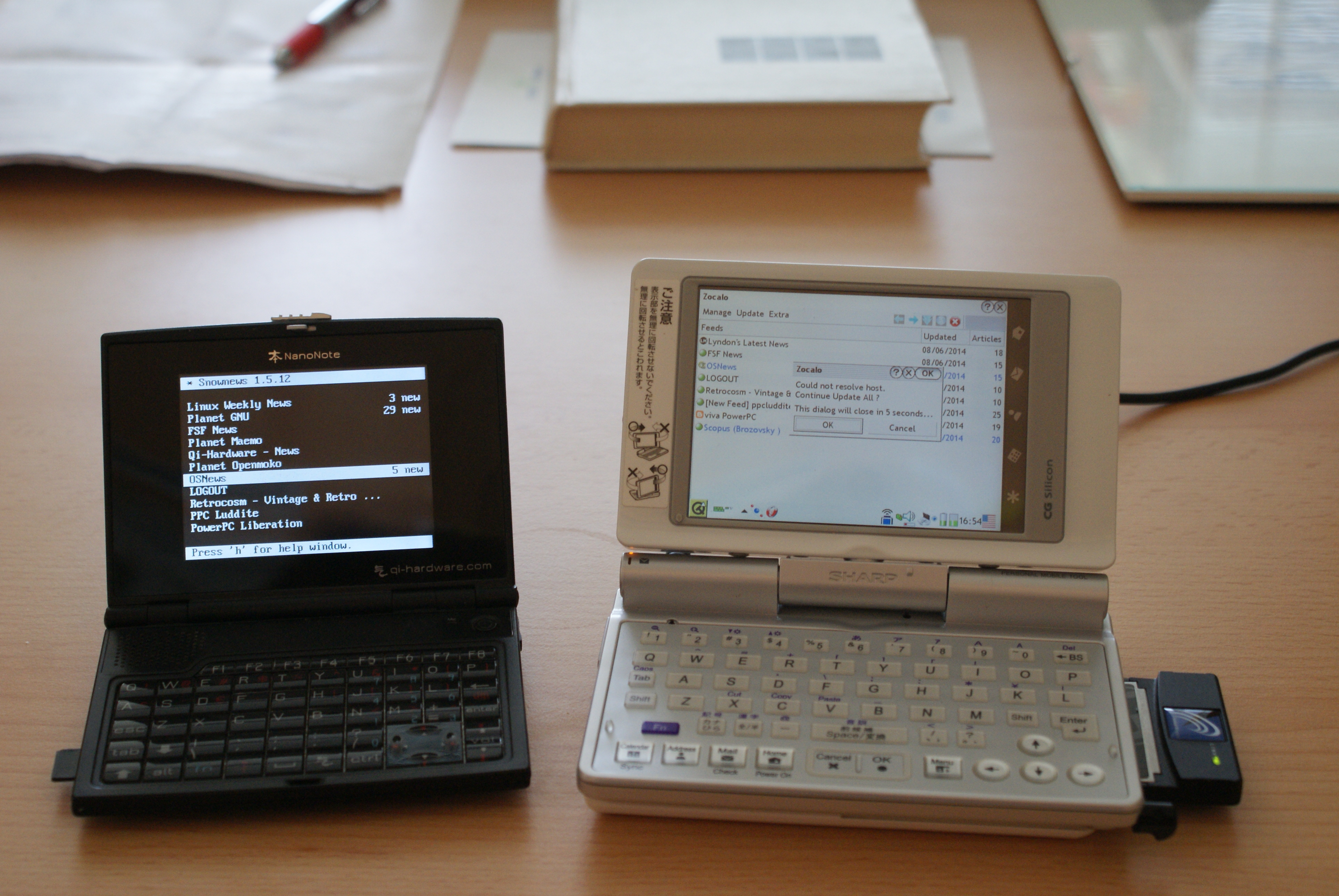
Zaurus SL-C760 next to a Ben NanoNote

Sharp has continued development of the SL series in Japan releasing the SL-C700, C750, C760 and C860 models which all feature 640x480 VGA screen resolution. They are all based on faster 400 MHz Intel XScale technology, although the SL-C700 was flawed and the apparent speed was the same as the 206 MHz SL-5500. All four of the SL-C models are clamshell type devices with the unusual ability to rotate the screen. This allows the device to be used in landscape mode with the keyboard, much like a miniature notebook PC, or in portrait mode as a PDA.

Sharp introduced a very different device from the clamshells in the form of the SL-6000 in early 2004; the SL-6000L (Wi-Fi only, no Bluetooth) was sold in North America, the last and only device since the 5xxx series to be officially sold outside Japan. It returned to the slider form of the 5xxx, but with a VGA display; a slider with a few key buttons covered a thumbboard. There was a joint project with IBM; the 6000 did not gain mass popularity and Amazon sold off their remaindered stock.

In October 2004 Sharp announced the SL-C3000 - the world's first PDA with an integrated hard disk drive (preceding the Palm Life Drive). It featured a similar hardware and software specification to the earlier C860 model; the key differences were that it only had 16 MB of flash memory yet gained an internal 4 GB Hitachi Microdrive, a USB Host port, and "lost" the serial port (in some cases the components were not fitted to the motherboard or were incapable of driving the regular serial adaptor cables). The keyboard feel and layout changed somewhat, and most owners preferred it over the 760/860.

In March 2005 the C3000 product was joined by the SL-C1000 which returned to the traditional 128 MB flash memory but lost the internal Microdrive. The C1000 was cheaper, lighter, faster in execution due to running from flash memory, but would require the user to "waste" the SD or CF card slots to fit a memory card for mass storage; at the time the largest card supported was 1GB. The C1000 cannot be upgraded to fit an internal Microdrive because vital components were missing, but the space can be used to fit internal Bluetooth and Wi-Fi modules using the USB host facility.

In June 2005, Sharp released the SL-C3100, which had flash capacity of the C1000 yet also had the Microdrive, and proved a very popular model indeed. The 1000, 3000 and 3100 models were overclockable, boosting the device's ability to play back video more smoothly.

In March 2006 the latest model launched, predictably labelled as the SL-C3200. It is basically an SL-C3100 but with the newer 6 GB Hitachi Microdrive and another tweak to the case colours. The Intel PXA270 CPU is a later variant, and some would regard as inferior because it cannot be overclocked so highly. The kernel gained a vital tweak to the Sharp proprietary SD/MMC module and allowed 4GB SD cards to be used (and this was quickly borrowed by 3000 and 3100 owners). The software package gained text-to-speech software from Nuance Communications and an upgraded dictionary.

While the SL series devices have long been sold only in Japan, there are companies in Japan who specialise in exporting them worldwide; sometimes without modifying them at all, sometimes an English conversion is available at extra cost. Not all Zaurus models came from Sharp with universal (100/110/240 V) power supplies (the Zaurus takes a regulated 5 V/1 A supply), so either an additional or an exchanged power adaptor would be needed, and not all exporters provide this by default.

There are also companies in the US, UK and Germany who are unofficial resellers; one notable example is Trisoft who prepare and certify the device to "CE" standard compliance.

Since there is no official export channel from Japan, Sharp offers no warranty or repair service outside Japan, so foreign buyers are dependent on their chosen reseller to handle repairs, usually by sending to their agent in Japan who acts as if the device was owned and used in Japan in order to have it repaired by Sharp, before sending it back to the owner. Whilst Zauruses are actually quite robust devices, due to their miniaturization they are not easily repairable by casual electronics hobbyists.

In December 2008, Sharp officially announced the discontinuation of the Zaurus line, marking the end of one of the last independently produced PDAs series.

Their later units were the WS003SH and WS004SH which, whilst adding wireless and cellular phone and data features, ran the Windows Mobile 5.0 operating system/application suite.

== Models ==
- Personal Information (PI) series
  - Pi² T, proof of concept model presented in April 1992
  - PI-3000, the first model, introduced to the Japanese market on October 1, 1993
  - PI-4000/FX, second generation with ink and fax capabilities, on sale in Japan June 1994
  - PI-5000/FX/DA, first model capable of syncing data to a personal computer, going on sale in November 1994.
  - PI-4500, introduced in January 1995
  - PI-6000/FX, featuring a new handwriting recognition software, on sale in Japan August 1995.
  - PI-6000DA, adding a digital adapter for cellular phones, introduced on December 12, 1995
  - PI-7000, dubbed AccessZaurus (アクセスザウルス) sports a built in modem, is introduced in February 1996.
    - Note: Confusingly, Sharp made another unit called the "PI-7000 ExpertPad", which was a Newton based device, not a Zaurus.
  - PI-6500, was introduced to the Japanese market with a list price of 55,000 Yen on November 22, 1996. Measuring 147x87x17 mm and weighing 195 g including the batteries, it sports a 239x168 dot matrix display and 715 KB of user addressable memory.
  - PI-8000, went on sale on January 24, 1997 with a list price of 80,000 Yen. It featured a 319x168 dot matrix display, 711KB user addressable memory, measuring 157 x 90 x 17 mm, and weighing 215 g including batteries.
  - PI-6600, the last AccessZaurus with a 239 x 168 dot matrix display, measuring 147 x 87 x 17 mm and a weight of 195 g including batteries. It went on sale in Japan on September 25, 1997.
- K-PDA (ZR) series
  - ZR-3000, 320x240 touch screen, 1 MB RAM.
  - ZR-3500, similar to the ZR-3000, with new internal 14.4/9.6 kbit/s modem.
  - ZR-5000/FX, a clam-shell model only sold outside Japan, going on sale in January 1995.
  - ZR-5700 Has a pen-based touch screen, 320 x 240 LCD, and 1 MB of RAM.
  - ZR-5800 Screen is backlit, and 2 MB of RAM.
- MI series
  - MI-10DC/10, nicknamed ColorZaurus, was the first model to have a color display. The DC model featured a digital camera and was initially priced 155,000 Yen. The MI-10 was listed as 120,000 Yen. Both models went on sale on June 25, 1996.
  - MI-506DC/506/504, PowerZaurus
  - MI-110M/106M/106, ZaurusPocket
  - MI-610/610DC, PowerZaurus
  - MI-310, ZaurusColorPocket
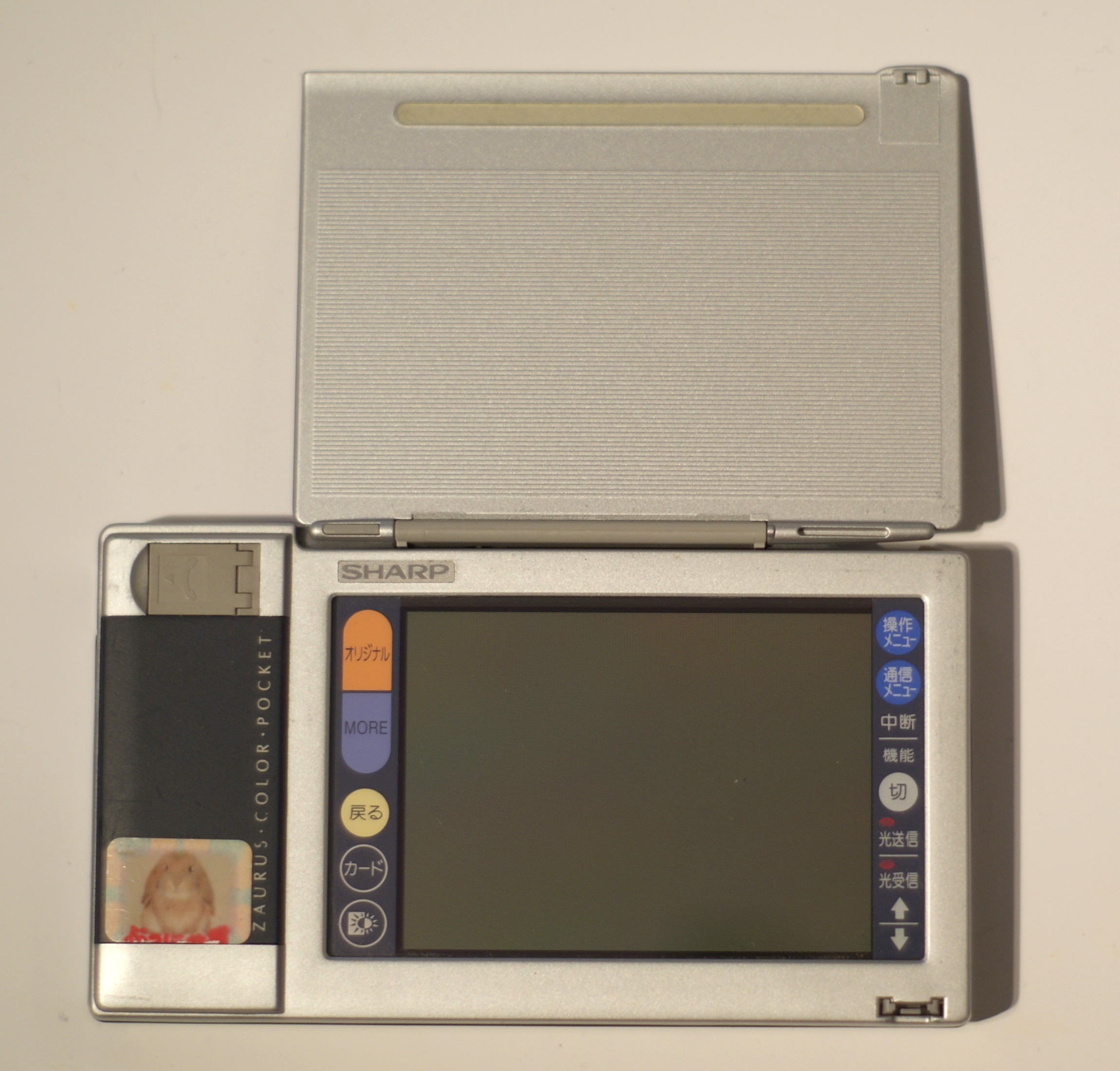
    Zaurus MI-310
  - MI-EX1, Zaurus iCRUISE - This was the first PDA with a 640x480 resolution display
  - MI-C1-A/S, PowerZaurus
  - MI-P1-W/A/LA, Zaurus iGeti
  - MI-P2-B, Zaurus iGeti - More internal software, more Flash
  - MI-P10-S, Zaurus iGeti - Larger RAM and Flash than P1/P2
  - MI-J1, Internet Dictionary Zaurus
  - MI-E1, First vertical display model - mini keyboard
  - MI-L1, Stripped down E1 - lacks display backlight
  - MI-E21, Enhanced version of E1 - double RAM and ROM size
  - MI-E25DC, a MI-E21 with an internal 640 x 480 digital camera
- Other MI Series related devices
  - BI-L10, Business Zaurus - Mono screen, 4 Mb IRDA, Network Adapter
  - MT-200, Communications pal - Keyboard input, limited I/O
  - MT-300, Communications pal - 4 MB flash, restyled
  - MT-300C, Communications pal - CDMAone version
  - Browser Board, MT-300 with NTT DoCoMo specific software
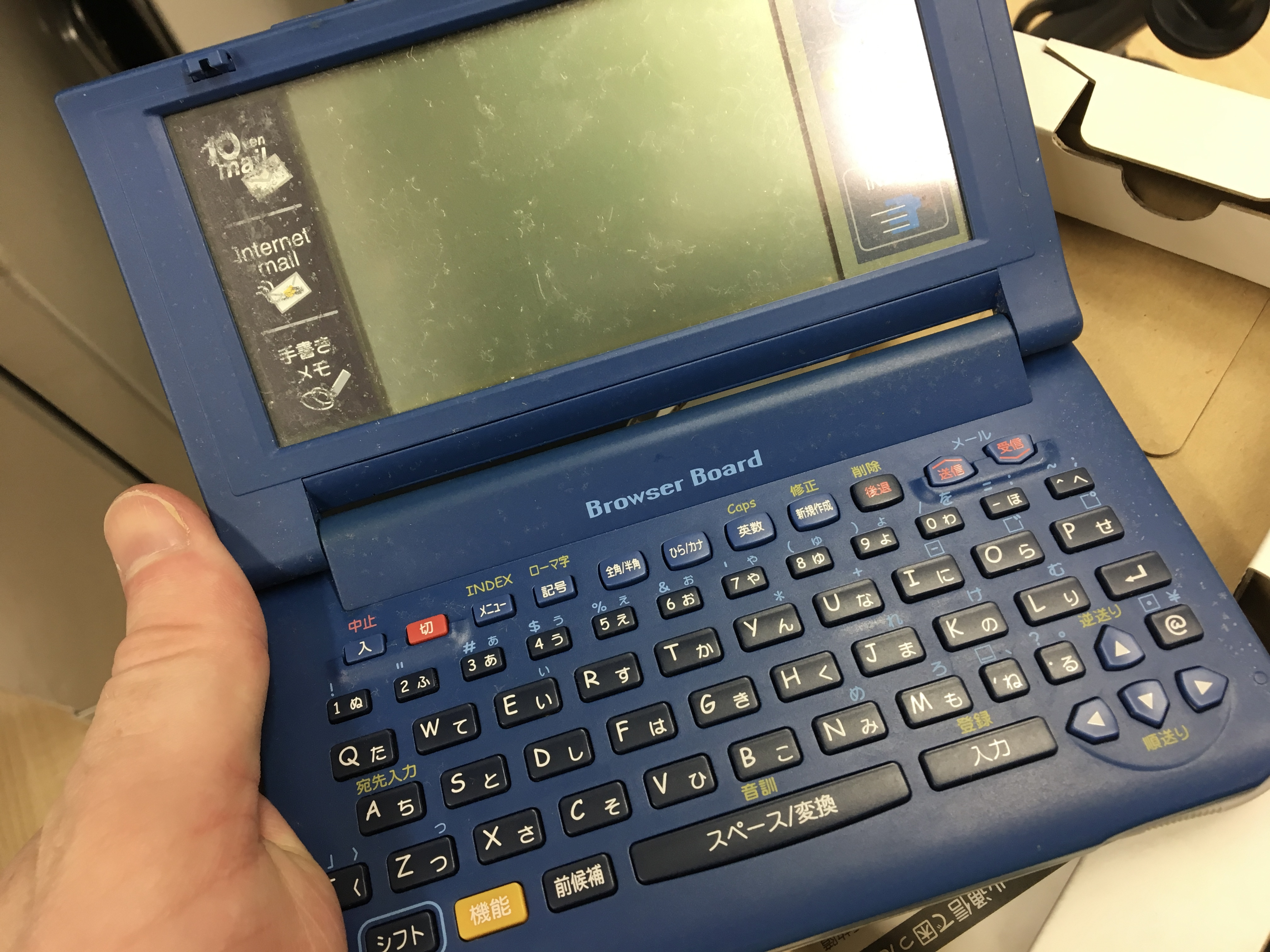
    MT-300 Browser Board
- Linux based SL series
  - SL-5000D, a developer edition of the SL-5500, containing 32 MB of RAM. (2001)
  - SL-5500 (Collie), the first new Zaurus to be sold outside Japan, is based on the Intel SA-1110 StrongARM processor running at 206 MHz, has 64 MB of RAM and 16MB Flash, a built-in keyboard, CompactFlash (CF) slot, Secure Digital (SD) slot, and Infrared port. (2002)
  - SL-A300 (Discovery), an ultra-light PDA with no keyboard. Based on the Intel XScale PXA210 200 MHz processor, sold only in Japan (2003)
  - SL-5600 (Poodle), the successor to the SL-5500, with greater processing capability, increased RAM and an inbuilt speaker and microphone. Based on the Intel XScale 400 MHz processor. However some had a Cache bug on the PXA250 processor (easily fixed!). Popular ROMs for the SL-5600 include Watapon, Synergy, and OpenZaurus. (2002)
    - SL-B500, name of the SL-5600 in Japan
  - SL-C700 (Corgi), a clam-shell model and the first PDA to use Sharp's "System LCD". Based on the Intel XScale PXA250 400 MHz processor, sold only in Japan. (2003)
  - SL-C750 (Shepherd), an improved version of the SL-C700 with longer battery life, a faster processor and updated software, sold only in Japan. (2003)
  - SL-C760 (Husky), an improved version of the SL-C700 with double the internal flash storage of the SL-C750 and a larger battery, sold only in Japan. (2004)
  - SL-C860 (Boxer), similar to SL-C760, it contains a software upgrade which allows it to be recognised as a USB storage device and has built in English-Japanese translation software, sold only in Japan.
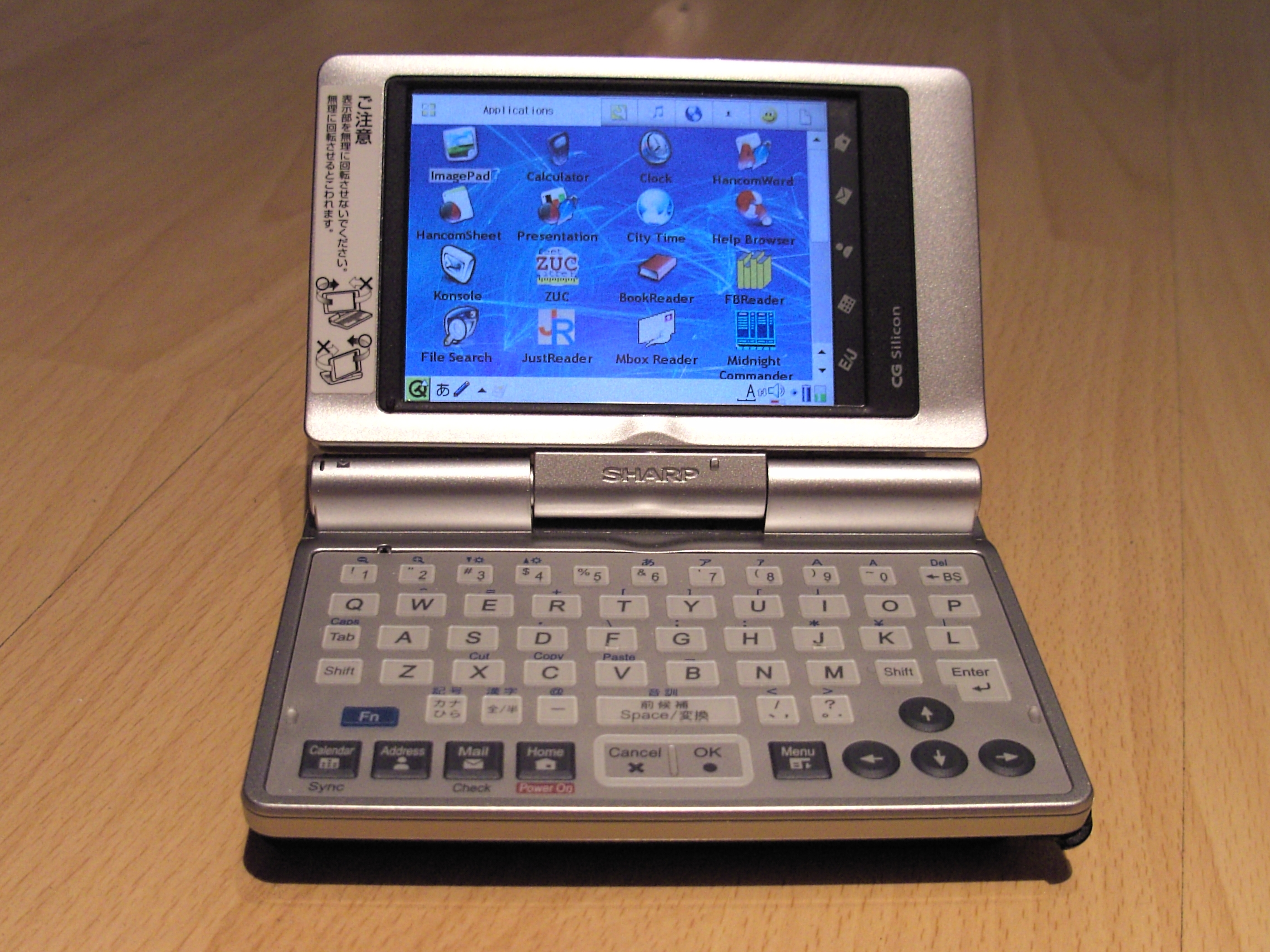
    A Sharp Zaurus SL-C860 with an alternative OS
    (2004)
  - SL-6000 (Tosa) (2005), the successor to the SL-5600, available in 3 versions:
    - SL-6000N, 4" VGA display, Intel XScale PXA255 400 MHz processor, 64 MB flash memory, 64 MB SDRAM, CF and SD slots, and IR port. Built in microphone, speaker, USB host port.
      There seems to be a version called HC-6000N equipped with Microsoft Windows Mobile 2003 Second Edition, and a handheld from Hitachi called FLORA-ie MX1 with same hardware, both are only available in Japan.
    - SL-6000L, same as SL-6000N, also with built-in 802.11b Wi-Fi.
    - SL-6000W, same as SL-6000N, also with built-in 802.11b Wi-Fi and Bluetooth.
  - SL-C3000 (Spitz), similar to SL-C860, the SL-C3000 contains a USB host port to allow the connection of USB devices such as keyboards and mice. It also features an Intel Xscale PXA270 416 MHz CPU. While that model features only 16 MB flash storage it has a 4 GB Hitachi HDD and was the first PDA to feature a hard disk. It is sold only in Japan.
  - SL-C1000 (Akita), similar to SL-C3000, but with 128 MB Flash ROM instead of HDD.
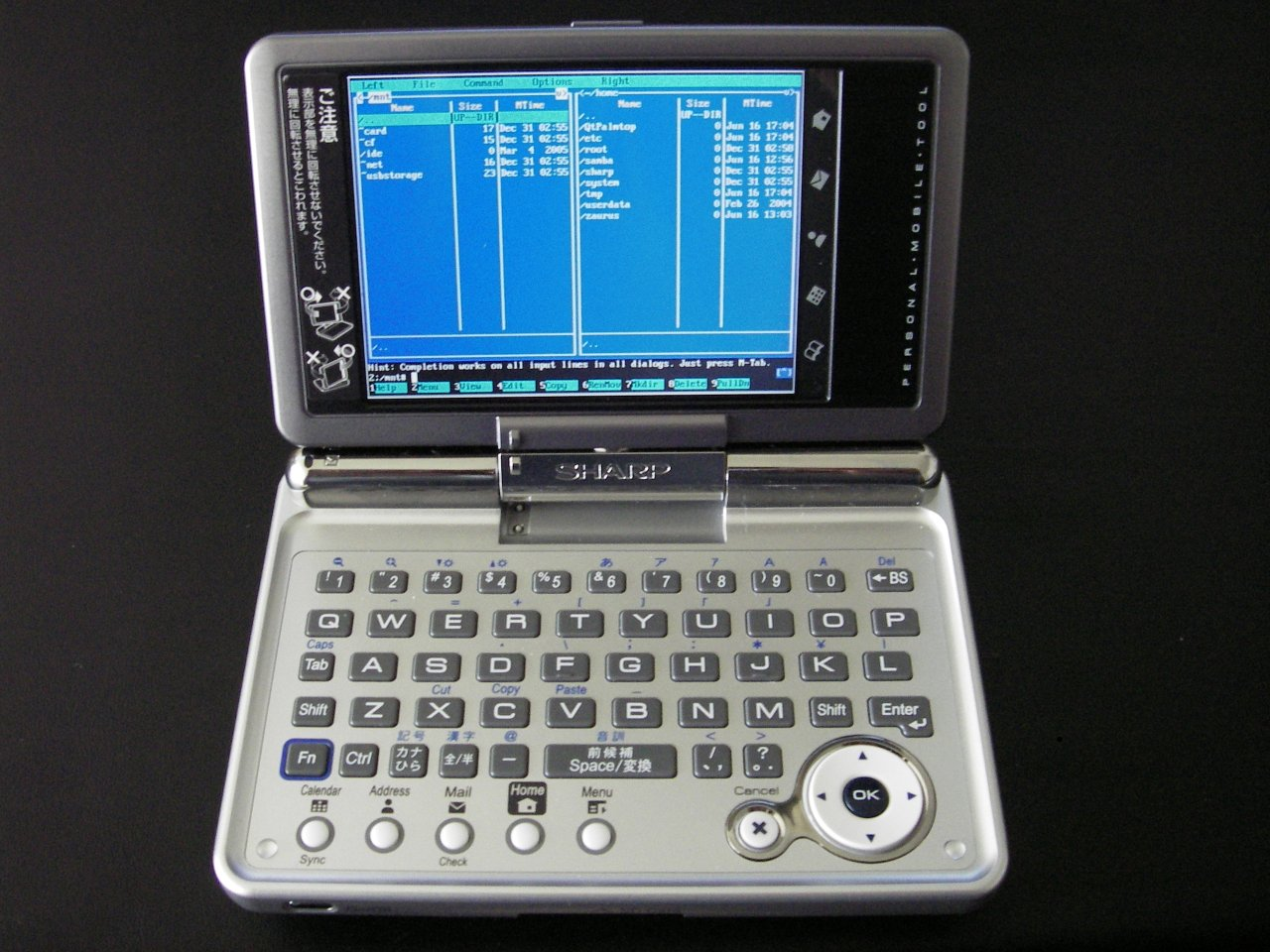
    A Sharp Zaurus SL-C1000, displaying Midnight Commander
  - SL-C3100 (Borzoi), similar to SL-C3000, Flash ROM has been increased 128 MB, still has 4 GB HDD.
  - SL-C3200 (Terrier), latest clam-shell model, released on March 17, 2006, similar to SL-C3100. HDD has been increased to 6 GB, comes with updated dictionary, text to speech software from Nuance Communications and TOEIC (Test of English for International Communication) test.
- Business use (for specific customers)
  - PI-B304/B308, x86 16-bit CPU (NEC V53A) MS-DOS-based. RAM 2MB, flash memory B304 2MB/B308 6MB. IrDA 1.0/1.1, PCMCIA Type II, 5.9 inch 480 x 320 reflective monochrome LCD.

== Operating systems ==
These are frequently called 'ROMs' in the community because the Zaurus' OS is usually stored in embedded flash memory, and are installed using a flashing tool. There's also a special "rescue" mode NOR flash (or P2ROM in newer models) in all Zauruses since the 5xxx series which allows recovery from a corrupted OS.

- OpenZaurus, which uses the OPIE or GPE graphical user interfaces and is designed for the power user. OpenZaurus does not include the proprietary software that comes with Sharp's distribution. OpenZaurus development has been dropped in favour of Ångström which is also based on the OpenEmbedded build environment, but supports a larger range of devices, not limited to Zauri.
- Ångström distribution, the replacement for OpenZaurus. OpenZaurus no longer is being developed for, as its developers now work on Ångström distribution. Ångström is an OpenEmbedded build system based Zaurus distribution with its current images being console and an X11 GPE based ROM.
- pdaXrom, a distribution based on the X graphics system and the matchbox/openbox user interface.
- Cacko, an alternative to the original Sharp ROM, it is based on the same Qt graphics system with as many underlying parts of the OS upgraded as possible yet still maintains full compatibility and allows the proprietary Sharp applications to be run.
- In August 2007 a port of Gentoo Linux was started which offers some promise.
- Zubuntu, based on the ARM port of Ubuntu for the clamshell models C3x00 et al., SL-6000 was started in 2008.
- Arch Linux ARM has been ported in 2015 on the C3x00 models.

For the Sharp and Cacko ROMs, there are third-party and somewhat experimental kernels such as "Tetsu's" (a Japanese Zaurus expert) which offer interesting optimisations and drivers for unusual hardware. It is possible to replace only the Linux kernel which can give better performance while maintaining compatibility and retaining installed software that comes with a "stock" ROM.

As well as the choice of GUI (qt/qtopia, X11 + matchbox, X11 + E17 etc.), one key difference is the choice of whether the kernel was built with using ARM standard EABI or not, and whether it uses software or hardware floating point (code using hardware floating point is actually slower because the hardware doesn't support it, so those instructions cause an exception which then has to be handled by the kernel, with noticeable overhead).

There was a port of OpenBSD for several Zaurus models. The port is available on the SL-C3000, SL-C3100, and SL-C3200 with development continuing in order to expand support to the C860 and C1000. This port of OpenBSD does not however replace the original operating system entirely, nor is it made available as a ROM image, instead it uses the original Linux install as a bootloader and installs the same as OpenBSD would on any other platform. There is also a NetBSD port is in development, based on the work from OpenBSD. In early September 2016, the OpenBSD Project ceased support for the Zaurus port of their operating system.

== Software ==
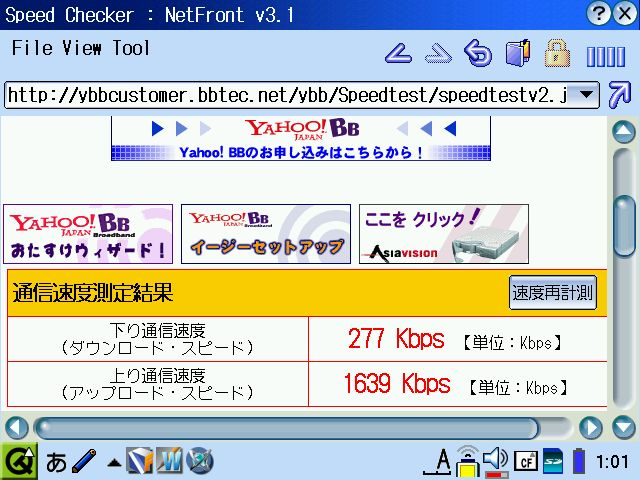
SL-C1000 screen with NetFront Browser on Qtopia desktop (converted to English)

With the switch to the Linux operating system the Zaurus became capable of running variations of a wide variety of proprietary and open source software, including web and FTP servers, databases, and compilers. Developers have created several replacement Linux distributions for the Zaurus. Software provided by Sharp includes basic PDA packages such as a datebook, addressbook, and to do list. These PIM applications are fairly unsophisticated, and a number of individuals and groups have developed alternatives. One popular - and free - alternative that runs on the Sharp ROM and OpenZaurus as well as Windows and Linux is the KDE PIM/Platform-independent set of applications. KDE PIM/PI is based on PIM applications from the KDE desktop suite for Linux. KDE PIM/PI includes KOrganizer/Platform-independent (or KOPI), KAddressbook/Platform-independent (or KAPI), K-OpieMail/pi (or OMPI), K-Phone/pi (kppi) and PwM/PI, a password manager with strong encryption.

In addition to standard PDA applications there are many programs available that are more commonly associated with desktop and laptop computers. Among these are a selection of office programs, web browsers, media applications and many others. Although primarily a business machine, a selection of games were developed for the platform by Sonic Powered, as well as open-source video games by New Breed Software, Karl Bartel, and Silvio Iaccarino, among others, as well as video game emulators. Several of these developers had previously produced games for the Agenda VR3 PDA which also ran Linux.
