= SHR (operating system) =

Linux distribution for smartphones

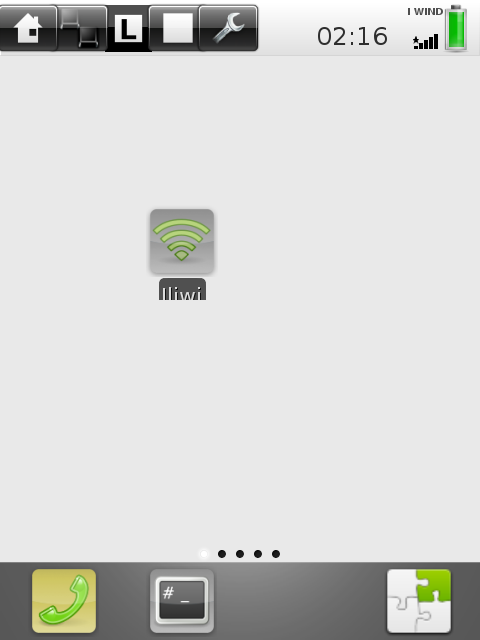
- SHR Core
- Developer: SHR community
- OS family: Linux (Unix-like)
- Working state: Obsolete
- Source model: Open source
- Available in: Multilingual
- Update method: opkg
- Package manager: opkg
- Supported platforms: ARM
- Kernel type: Monolithic (Linux)
- Userland: GNU
- Default user interface: Enlightenment's Illume 2
- License: Mainly the GNU GPL / plus various other licenses
- Official website: shr-project.org at the Wayback Machine (archived 2012-07-23)

SHR (formerly Stable Hybrid Release) was a community-driven Linux distribution for smartphones which was based on OpenEmbedded, Xorg, and the freesmartphone.org (FSO) framework. Several different graphical toolkits were made available, such as GTK+ and Qt.

== Supported devices ==
The unstable and testing releases were released for Openmoko's Neo 1973 and FreeRunner smartphones.

Later on, SHR Core supported the FreeRunner and the GTA04.

SHR Core was also being ported to several devices like the HTC Dream, the Nexus S, the Palm Pre and Nokia N900 devices. With various degrees of completion.

== Applications ==
SHR had several rudimentary applications specially made for it, like an address book software, a dialer, an SMS application and so on. It was also possible to install these applications on Debian.

Many graphical Linux applications were also available like Midori and Pidgin, and it was also possible to use the terminal with the ash shell through a terminal application.

Front-ends for MPlayer, and other software like FoxtrotGPS that were developed for the OpenMoko and/or the distributions that ran on it were also available on SHR.

== Software stack ==
The use of Xorg enabled to use many Linux applications, with various degrees of usability due to hardware constraints of the supported devices. Most/All of the supported devices had small displays with high Pixel density, and most of them had only a touchscreen based input and very few buttons.

SHR used the FSO framework middleware to handle the smartphones power management and various peripherals. Several SHR developers were also contributing to the FSO framework in order to port SHR to newer devices.

== See also ==
- Openmoko
- Replicant (operating system)
- Rooting (Android OS)
- Comparison of Linux distributions
