= Qt Extended =

Application platform

- Developer: The Qt Company
- OS family: Linux
- Working state: Discontinued
- Latest release: 4.4.3 / March 5, 2009; 17 years ago
- Kernel type: Monolithic kernel
- License: GPL and proprietary
- Official website: qt.nokia.com

Qt Extended (named Qtopia before September 30, 2008) is an application platform for embedded Linux-based mobile computing devices such as personal digital assistants, video projectors and mobile phones. It was initially developed by The Qt Company, at the time known as Qt Software and a subsidiary of Nokia. When they cancelled the project the free software portion of it was forked by the community and given the name Qt Extended Improved. The QtMoko Debian-based distribution is the natural successor to these projects as continued by the efforts of the Openmoko community.

== Features ==
Qt Extended features:

- Windowing system
- Synchronization framework
- Integrated development environment
- Internationalization and localization support
- Games and multimedia
- Personal information manager applications
- Full screen handwriting
- Input methods
- Personalization options
- Productivity applications
- Internet applications
- Java integration
- Wireless support

Qt Extended is dual licensed under the GNU General Public License (GPL) and proprietary licenses.

== Devices and deployment ==
As of 2006, Qtopia was running on several million devices, including 11 mobile phone models and 30 other handheld devices.

Models included the Sharp Corporation Zaurus line of Linux handhelds, the Sony mylo, the Archos Portable Media Assistant (PMA430) (a multimedia device), the GamePark Holdings GP2X, Greenphone (an open phone initiative), Pocket PC, FIC Openmoko phones: Neo 1973 and FreeRunner. An unofficial hack allows its use on the Archos wifi series of portable media players (PMP) 604, 605, 705, and also on several Motorola phones such as E2, Z6 and A1200. The U980 of ZTE is the last phone running it.

== Software development ==
Native applications could be developed and compiled using C++. Managed applications could be developed in Java.

Qt Extended Improved
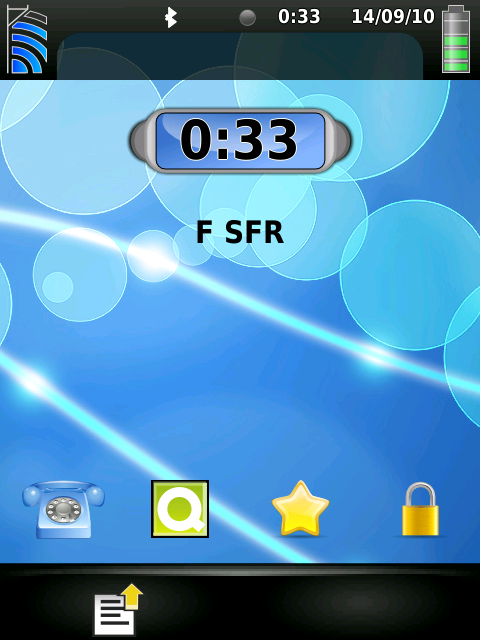
- Developer: Qt Extended Improved Project
- OS family: Linux
- Latest release: 4.5.2 / June 28, 2009; 17 years ago
- Kernel type: Monolithic kernel
- License: GPL and proprietary
- Official website: wiki.openmoko.org/wiki/Qt_Extended_Improved

== Discontinuation ==
On March 3, 2009, Qt Software announced the discontinuation of Qt Extended as a standalone product, with some features integrated on the Qt Framework.

== Qt Extended Improved ==
The Openmoko community has forked the final stable release into Qt Extended Improved (later renamed to QtMoko) which, like its predecessor, is an application platform for embedded Linux-based mobile computing devices such as personal digital assistants, video projectors and mobile phones dual licensed under the GNU General Public License (GPL) and proprietary licenses.

Qt Extended Improved can run on several mobile devices, most notably the Openmoko phones: Neo 1973 and FreeRunner.

== Other mobile operating systems ==
- Access Linux Platform
- Android
- iOS
- MeeGo
- Nucleus RTOS
- Openmoko Linux
- Palm webOS
- Symbian
- Tizen
- Windows Mobile

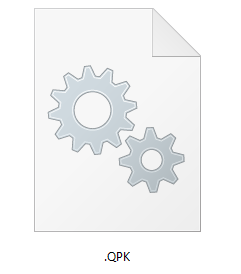
Qt Extended data structure file
