= Archos Generation 7 =

Internet tablet

The Archos Generation 7 (Gen7) product series is represented by misc "Internet Tablets" or "IT", e.g. the Archos 5 Internet Tablet (sometimes abbreviated as "Archos 5 IT"). This series of tablet computers developed by the French company Archos that features a resistive touchscreen for video, photo, audio, internet browsing and other multimedia applications. The individual numbering of the distinct models seems up to now to roughly resemble the length of the display diagonal in inches.

== Archos 5 Internet Tablet ==
In September 2009 Archos announced the Archos 5 Internet Tablet.

Being an extension of the Gen6 Archos 5 Internet Media Tablet, this Internet Tablet utilizes Google's Android mobile operating system .

== Specification ==
- Processor based on ARM Cortex-A8, 32-bit, dual-issue, superscalar core @ 800 MHz
- 256 MB of RAM
- 4.8" display, 800 x 480 resolution
- Video Playback
- Music Playback
- Storage: 8, 16, 32 or 64 GB Flash memory + Micro SD Slot (SDHC compatible) or 160 GB - 500 GB with 2.5" hard drive (ext3 filesystem)
- Built-in GPS
- Bluetooth 2.0
- FM Radio
