= HTC Universal =

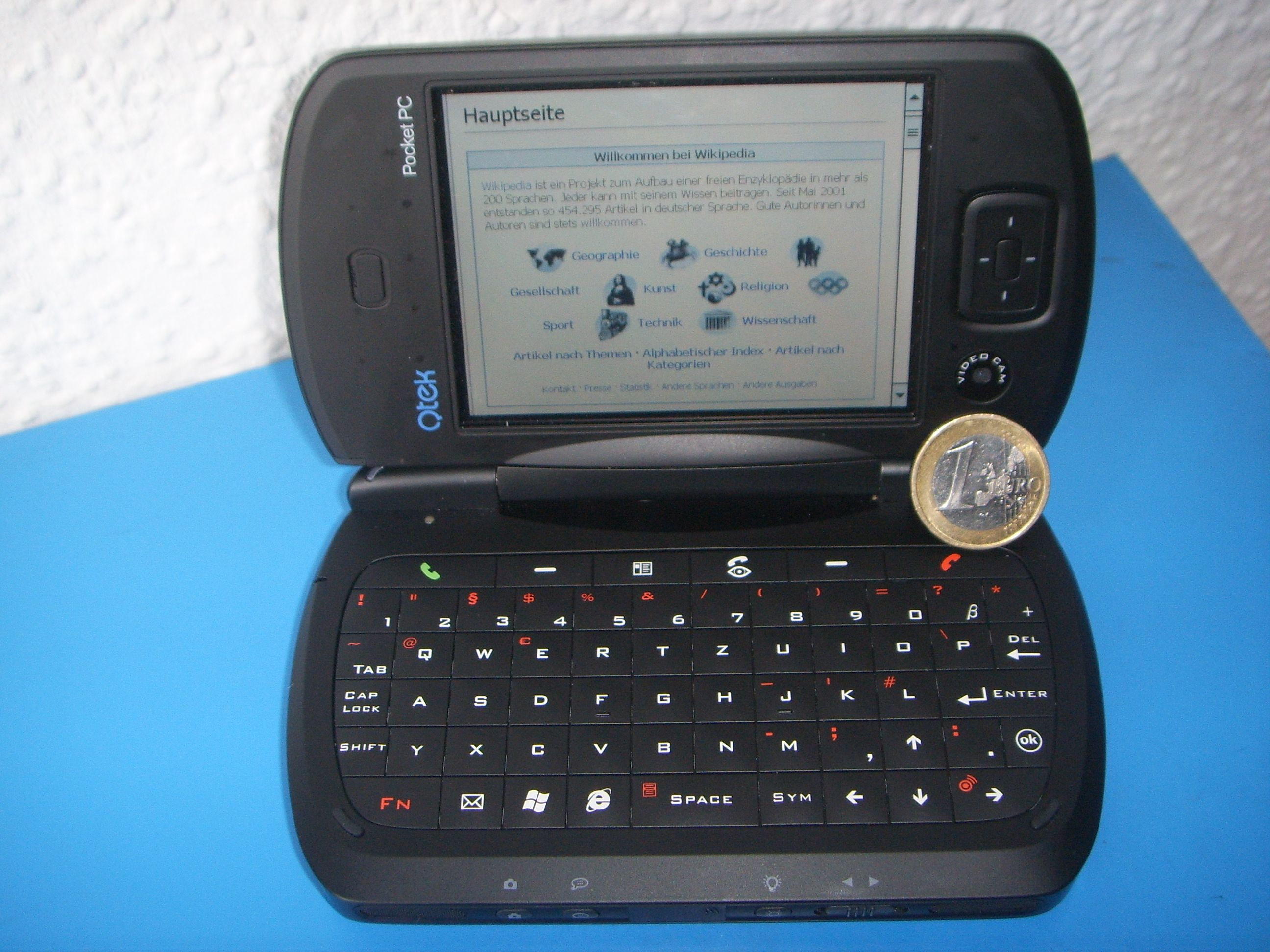
- Manufacturer: High Tech Computer Corporation
- Type: Pocket PC phone
- Lifespan: Q3 2005
- Media: SD (with SDIO, but not SDHC), 128 MB internal flash storage
- Operating system: Windows Mobile 5.0
- CPU: Intel Bulverde 520 MHz
- Display: 3.6" 65k-color 640x480(VGA) Transflective TFT
- Input: Keyboard/Touchscreen
- Camera: 1.3 Megapixel + VGA
- Touchpad: Resistive Touchscreen
- Connectivity: GSM/GPRS, Bluetooth 1.2, WiFi 802.11b, USB, IR, WCDMA / UMTS (more commonly known as 3G)
- Power: 1620mAh Lithium Ion Polymer battery

The HTC Universal is a Windows Mobile 5.0 Pocket PC PDA manufactured by High Tech Computer Corporation. It was the first 3G/UMTS-enabled Pocket PC PDA with a telecommunications function, and also the first to come with Windows Mobile 5.0 pre-installed.

It was sold by many different vendors under the names of O2 xda Exec, Orange SPV M5000, Dopod 900, Qtek 9000, T-Mobile MDA Pro, I-mate JasJar, Vodafone v1640, Vodafone VPA IV, E-Plus PDA IV, etc. Despite all the different model names and housing appearance, they all have identical hardware specifications with small differences in the external color and branding.

The most notable feature of the HTC Universal is its 180-degree swivel screen, allowing a quick swap between portrait mode and landscape mode. The included version of Windows Mobile 5.0 automatically adjusts screen orientation to match screen orientation.

== SIM lock ==
Most network-supplied versions of the Universal are shipped SIM-locked, with the O2 XDA Exec being a notable exception. However, a free SIM unlocking tool was released. This process involves flashing a new Radio ROM onto the device, and it may invalidate the device's warranty.

== Detailed specifications ==
- Screen Size: 3.7 in (9.4 cm) Transflective LCD
- Screen Resolution: 640 x 480 VGA at 216 ppi
- Input: 62-key QWERTY keyboard and touchscreen with stylus (included; stylus also available separately for 19 EUR as of October 2008)
- Cameras: 2
  - 1.3 MP CMOS Camera with LED "flash" mounted on the reverse of the keyboard section
  - QVGA (320 x 240) CMOS Camera for 3G video calling, mounted beside the screen, close to the hinge
- Processor: Intel Bulverde (PXA270) 520 MHz CPU
- Memory: Flash ROM: 128 MB, RAM: 128 MB/64 MB SDRAM
- Memory expansion: SDIO/MMC card slot (officially without SDHC, with maximum capacity supported being 4GB, but there is unofficial SDHC support from xda-developers – SDHC cards are accepted with Windows Mobile 6.1 or higher and there is another unofficial update to Windows Mobile 5 that allows the use of SDXC cards up to 64GB.)
- Network Standard: Tri-Band GSM/GPRS (900/1800/1900) + WCDMA (UMTS) (2100 MHz)
- GPRS: Class B Multi-slot standard class 10 PBCCH MO/MT SMS over GPRS
- Connection interface: Client only Mini-USB connector, USB charging, USB 2.0 protocol
- Wireless connectivity: Infrared IrDA FIR, Bluetooth 1.2 Class 2 compliant, WiFi 802.11b IEEE 802.11b compliant, Internal Antenna, 11, 5.5, 2 and 1 Mbit/s per channel, 64-, 128-bit WEP and WPA standard data encryption
- Standard battery capacity: 1620 mAh (included; battery is removable)
- Charging: Mini USB (also used for data transfer)

== Extended batteries ==
There have been many high-capacity "extended" batteries available for the HTC Universal. 2600mAh, 3150mAh, 3200mAh, 3800mAh, 4800mAh and even 5200mAh models have been sold by various retailers, which allow the device to run for an extended period of time. Similarly to most expandable battery technology, they make the device heavier. The 3800 mAh battery is a Lithium-Ion battery with model number PU16B manufactured by Dynapack International Technology Corporation in Taiwan.

== Unofficial extensions ==
Registry editing and ROM reflashing can be used to modify the device's included software to add such features as:

- Wireless G (802.11g) connectivity. This only allows the device to communicate using the 802.11g protocol instead of 802.11b; it does not give a speed increase beyond 11 Mbit. However, numerous online sources now say this no longer works.
- Full emulation of an "SD card reader" (USB mass storage device class).
- Full VGA (640 x 480 resolution) graphics, as opposed to the "QVGA (320 x 240) emulation/compatibility mode" which the Universal runs in by default. The two main downsides to this are that some software cannot handle "true VGA" mode, which usually results in corrupted graphics, and that it can be quite difficult to see (and use a stylus with) such small screen elements as text.
- Emulation and mapping of additional keys not found on the Universal native keyboard, such as CTRL and ALT.
- Support for SDHC cards. 8 GB, 16 GB and 32 GB cards have been tested successfully. This is only made possible via a third-party hacked driver.
- 128 MB of RAM. It is possible to replace 64 MB memory modules with 128 MB one. It can be only used with 128 MB enabled ROMs but it makes more space for running applications.

=== Linux ===
It is possible to install a custom version of Linux on the HTC Universal. Despite the lack of cooperation by HTC (and most other smartphone/PPC manufacturers for that matter), drivers for most of the device's components are functional (the two cameras and the flash ROM being the only significant exceptions). It is possible to run various handheld Linux distributions on the Universal, though application support is in its infancy.

=== Windows Mobile 6 (Crossbow) ===
There are numerous "unofficial" builds of Windows Mobile 6 (Crossbow) which have been made to run on this device, and now even some tools that allow users to create their own custom WM6 ROM images (a process commonly known by the term "cooking ROMs"). There is a community dedicated to improving these WM6 builds (and associated tools) on the Universal.
