= First International Computer =

Taiwanese company

First International Computer, Inc. 大眾電腦股份有限公司
- Company type: Publicly Listed on the Taiwan Stock Exchange (TSE 3701)
- Industry: DMS (Design manufacture service)
- Founded: 1979; 47 years ago
- Headquarters: Taipei, Taiwan
- Key people: Dr. Ming-J Chien, Chairman; Charlene Wang, President of FICG, daughter of Wang Yung-ching; Leo Ming Tz Chien, President; Alex Dee, General Manager of Sales and R&D; Andy Lo, Vice President & Spokesman.
- Products: Automotive Electronics Design; Building Automation Solution; Intelligent Surveillance Solution
- Website: www.fic.com.tw

First International Computer, Inc. (FIC; Chinese: 大眾電腦股份有限公司; pinyin: Dàzhòng Diànnǎo Gǔfèn Yǒuxiàn Gōngsī) is a Taiwanese original equipment manufacturer and system integrator for automotive electronics and smart building controls. FIC provides design consultancy and supply chain management services for automotive electronic suppliers worldwide.

== History ==
Founded in 1979 by Dr. Ming-J Chien, in Taipei, Taiwan, FIC used to be a famous computer and component manufacturer in worldwide countries from 1979~2010; first listing on the Taiwan Stock Exchange in 1991. In the year 2004, Mr. Leo Chien, the son of Dr. Ming, joined the group, and contributed his expertise as COO of FIC in 2008; and in 2011, Mr. Leo Chien began to lead the group towards a new business development, with insight into the foreseeable market demand and analysis, and gradually moved the team towards the direction of automotive electronic design and manufacturing business. Throughout the years, he integrated the group's relevant technical resources in order to support the automotive electronic design business more comprehensively and became CEO of FIC in 2016. FIC is publicly listed on the Taiwan Stock Exchange (TSE 3701).

1979: Charlene Wang and Ming Chien found company as a sales agent for main frame and micro computers.
1983: The company begins assembling its first PC computer systems under the Leo brand.
1987: The company enters motherboard manufacturing with large-scale production facility in Hsien-Tien.
1989: First International begins assembling PCs with Intel processors.
1991: U.S. and European subsidiaries are opened and production of the first in-house personal computer design begins.
1994: A configuration plant is opened in the Netherlands.
1996: A manufacturing and configuration plant is opened in Austin, Texas.
1997: A plant is opened in the Czech Republic.
1998: A plant is opened in Brazil.
1999: A large scale production facility is opened in Guanzhou, in mainland China.
2002: A new manufacturing headquarters is set up in China.
2003: Created the first AIO PC and became the e-book OEM partner of Panasonic.
2004: Transformed to a Holding company as known as FICG.
2005: Became the NB ODM partner of Fujitsu Siemens.
2007: Launched 7” UMPC.
2008: Obtained the value-added notebook orders from Fujitsu.
2010: Announced reseller agreement with Tridium to provide solutions in Green House & Environmental Controls.
2011: Focus on Automotive Electronic Design Business, and Spun off the IPC BU to a new company-Ubiqconn Technology
2012: Signed a Letter of Intent on healthcare business with NTT DATA Corporation.
2014: Ubiqconn is selected as In-vehicle System Provider for 2014 FIFA World Cup in Brazil.
2016: Expands its factory-installed products in Automotive solution.
2021: FIC Green System has passed the cloud DNP3.0 certification of Taipower.

== See also ==
- List of companies of Taiwan
