= Archos Generation 6 =

Tablet computers

ARCHOS 5
- Storage: 60 GB, 120 GB, 160 GB, 250 GB
- Display: WVGA (800x480) resolution, 24-bit color palette, 4.8" TFT LCD touchscreen
- Graphics: MPEG-4 AVI, MJPEG, WMV, with plug-in: H.264, AAC, MPEG-2, WMV HD, MPEG-4 HD; JPEG, BMP, PNG, GIF
- Sound: MP3, WMA, Protected WMA, WMA 5.1, WAV, OGG, FLAC, with plug-in: AAC3, AAC+, AC3
- Input: 3.5 mm Audio, Proprietary dock port
- Camera: with DVR Station/Travel Adapter. Records NTSC/PAL/SECAM in MPEG-4 AVI with VGA resolution @ 30 or 25 frame/s; with DVR Station/Travel Adapter: Stereo line-in, WAV
- Connectivity: connects through USB in either MSC or MTP, WiFi (802.11g)
- Power: Battery: Music playback: 22 hrs, Video playback: 7 hrs. External Battery available; charge: USB, DVR Station, optional Wall outlet
- Dimensions: 60 GB models 127.5 x 78.3 x 12.9 mm; 120/250 GB models 127 x 78.8 x 19.4 mm
- Weight: 60 GB models 250 g; 120/250 GB models 300 g

The Archos Generation 6 (Gen6) product series is represented by misc "Internet Media Tablets" or "IMT", e.g. the Archos 5 Internet Media Tablet (sometimes abbreviated as "Archos 5 IMT") This series of tablet computers developed by the French company Archos that features a resistive touchscreen for video, photo, audio, internet browsing and other multimedia applications. The individual numbering of the distinct models seems up to now to roughly resemble the length of the display diagonal in inches.

This sixth generation of devices was revealed on August 19, 2008. The three models are the Archos 5, Archos 7, and Archos 5g. Archos subsequently upgraded the Archos 5 to the Archos 5 Android. It can be purchased with up to a 500 GB hard drive, and includes new features and Bluetooth.

== Archos 5 ==
The Archos 5 features hard drive storage models from 60 through 250 GB. The integrated touch screen display is short before the 5" diagonal size. This IMT has an ARM Cortex A8 core based processor in form of a semiconductor from the OMAP3 series from TI running at 600 MHz.

The device comes with a media player that supports codec plugins. Some through plug-ins require payment. It includes an Archos custom operating system with Adobe Flash 9 support, and web radio/TV. Its possible to install alternate Linux distributions like Ångström.

== Archos 7 ==
The Archos 7 offers hard drive sizes of 160 GB and 320 GB. It has a 7" WVGA 800x480 pixels resistive touch screen and built in Wi-Fi and is an update to the 705 WiFi. Its processor core is formed by an OMAP3 model from Texas Instruments that is based upon the ARM Cortex A8 running at 600 MHz with further a video decoding accelerator.

It has the same software capabilities as the Archos 5

== Archos 9 ==
The Archos 9 is a touch screen tablet weighing 800g and 16mm thick. It has an Intel Atom Z515 1.2 GHz CPU and 1 GB onboard SDRAM (DDR2 400) and is available in a 60 GB model. It has a 1024x600 pixels, 9" inch resistive LED back-lit touchscreen, which has been described as "impressive" by reviewers. The device has both 802.11b/g Wifi and Bluetooth 2.1, 1 USB port, and can add an additional 2 USB ports, standard VGA monitor connection, and an Ethernet port via the Port Replicator accessory.

Unlike the previous models of the Archos series this device comes with the full version of Microsoft Windows 7 Starter Edition. Which includes Windows Live Messenger, which can utilize the integrated 1.3 MP webcam for portable video conferencing, voice calling and instant messaging. The vTuner software is also included, which is the Web Radio & TV plugin for Gen 6 & Gen 7 devices. The Software also includes IBM Lotus Symphony office software. As the device is x86-compatible it is reported by people that it is possible to run the device even with relatively stock Linux distribution even if not all hardware features are out of the box.

== Accessories ==
There are a notable amount of accessories for the IMT, which include:

- GPS add on (Archos 5 only) gives sat nav functionality to the device
- DVR station - This is used to Record TV and also view the videos stored on the Archos on a TV, which can be done through HDMI or a component cable. This will also charge the Archos tablet in just three hours using fast charge.
- DVR snap on - A smaller more portable version of the DVR station, but does not include the TV out feature.
- Helmet cam - records holidays etc. hands free
- remote FM - turns the IMT into a radio
- TV snap on - enables the viewing of digital TV, which can then be recorded in DVD quality
- Mini dock - Enables fast charging of the battery (3 hours), allows for use of mini-B rather than the proprietary connector, allows for USB host functionality and allows output of composite video and standard stereo sound.
- Battery dock - Provides the same features as the mini dock and also includes an internal battery that provides approximately 50% more battery life.

== See also ==
- Archos
- Portable media player
- CrunchPad
