= SIMpad =

The SIMpad is a portable computer developed by the company Keith & Koep by order of Siemens AG, with an 8.4" TFT touchscreen. Commonly used with wireless network cards, it was marketed as a device to browse the World Wide Web. Initially announced in January 2001 at the Consumer Electronics Show.

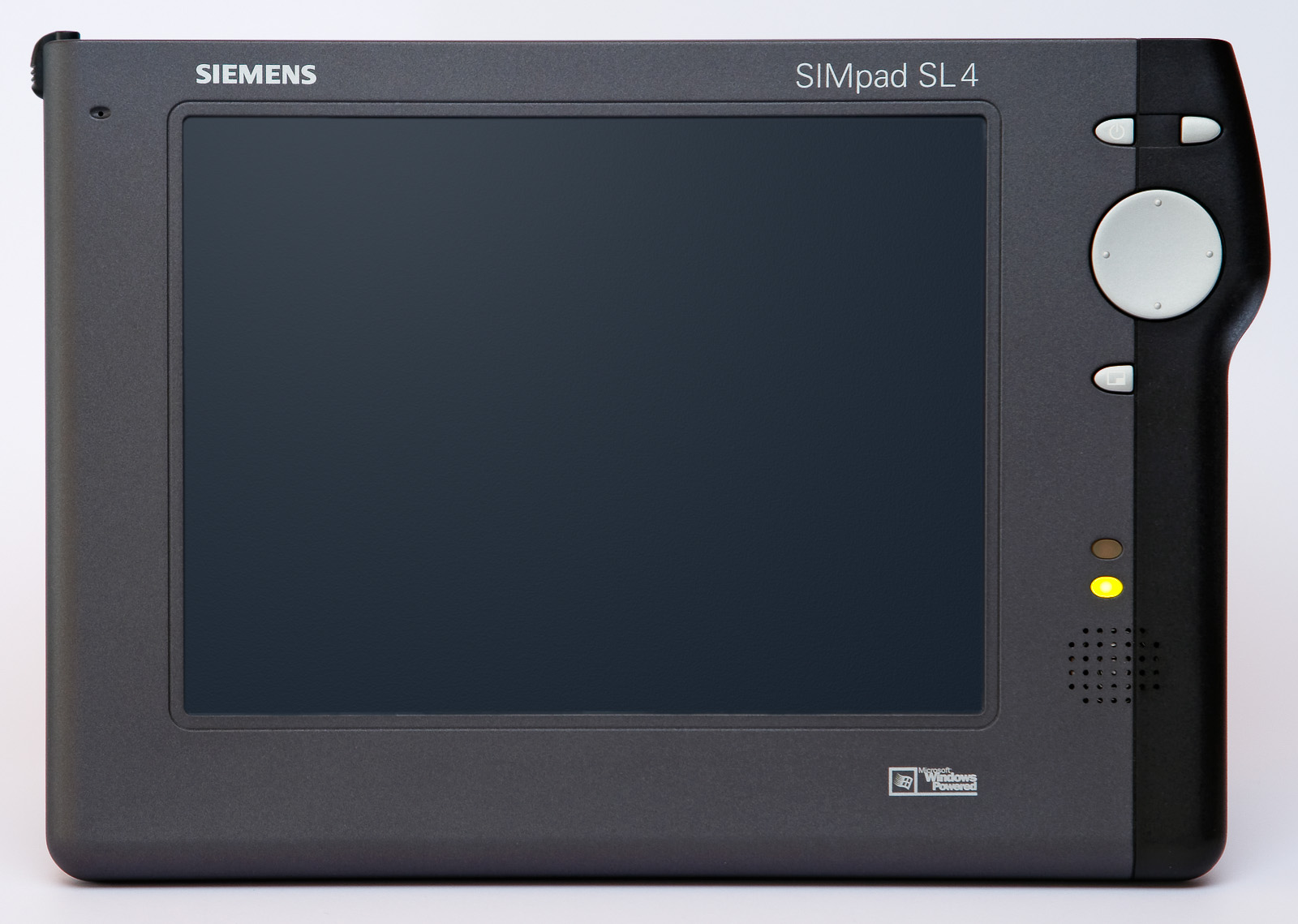
SIMpad SL4.

There are five known model variants, all out of production:

- CL4: The low-end model with 32 MB RAM and 16 MB Flash ROM without PC card slot but with DECT modem.
- WP50: A variant sold by Swisscom. Same as the CL4.
- T-Sinus Pad: A variant sold by Deutsche Telekom. This one is the same as the CL4 but with a PC card slot.
- SL4: The high end model, with 64 MB RAM and 32 MB Flash ROM. This one also has a PC card slot.
- SLC: Identical to the SL4, but with the addition of a Siemens MD34 DECT modem, allowing connection to certain Siemens ISDN telephone systems.

All variants contain:

- An Intel StrongARM#SA-1110 SA-1110 32-bit RISC processor with a clock frequency of 206 MHz
- An 8.4" TFT LCD with an SVGA resolution (800×600 pixels)
- 4-wire analog resistive touch interface
- A single 16-bit PC card slot (not included in some CL4 models designed to use the Siemens MD34 DECT module)
- A standard ISO/IEC 7816 SmartCard interface
- A USB 1.1 client interface (not fully functional in production releases, but see Mullenger.org below)
- An IrDA interface (V1.3, SIR)
- A serial interface (proprietary Siemens "Lumberg" socket)
- A 7.2 V 2800 mA·h Lithium Ion Battery (~4hr life)
- A built-in mono speaker
- A built-in microphone (not on CL4 models)
- A headphone interface (proprietary Siemens "Lumberg" socket)

All devices weigh approximately 2.2 lb (1 kg) and measure 10.35 × 7.08 × 1.10 inches (263 mm ×181 mm × 30 mm). The SIMpad was initially released with the Handheld PC 2000 (Windows CE 3.0) operating system, while later units (mostly SL4 and SLC) were released with Windows CE.NET (Windows CE 4.0). Since the SIMpad was discontinued in 2002, all manufacturer support was also discontinued.

The OpenSIMpad project offers a SIMpad related Wiki where one can find information about Linux, Windows CE, hardware and mods.
