= Familiar Linux =

Linux distribution for iPAQ machines and other PDAs

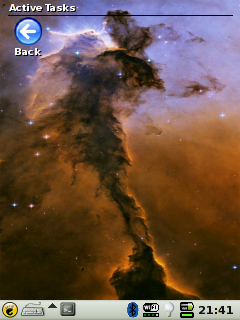
- OS family: Linux (Unix-like)
- Source model: Open source
- Latest release: v0.8.4 / / March, 2007
- Default user interface: OPIE, GPE
- License: GNU GPL
- Official website: familiar.handhelds.org

Familiar Linux is a discontinued Linux distribution for iPAQ devices and other personal digital assistants (PDAs), intended as a free replacement for Windows CE. It can use OPIE or GPE Palmtop Environment as the graphical user interface.

== Technical details ==
It is loosely based on the Debian ARM distribution, but uses the ipkg package manager. It contained Python and XFree86.

== History ==
In May 2000, Alexander Guy took a kernel that had been worked on by Compaq programmers, built a complete Linux distribution around it, and released the first version of Familiar (v0.1).

The first version was released in May 2000.

It was developed as part of the Handhelds.org project.

== Reception ==
According to a 2004 review by IBM DeveloperWorks, Familiar Linux needed more polish and "could gain mass acceptance if a dual-boot procedure were made possible".
