= HTC TyTN =

Smartphone model

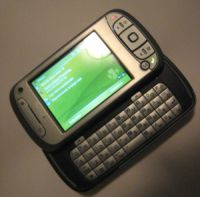
- Manufacturer: High Tech Computer Corporation
- Series: HTC TyTN
- Availability by region: June 2006; 20 years ago
- Predecessor: HTC Wizard
- Successor: HTC TyTN II
- Compatible networks: Quad band GSM 850 900 1800 1900, GPRS, EDGE; Tri band UMTS 850, 1900, 2100, HSDPA
- Form factor: Slide
- Dimensions: 112.5 mm (4.43 in) (h) 58 mm (2.3 in) (w) 21.95 mm (0.864 in) (d)
- Weight: 176 g (6.2 oz)
- Operating system: Windows Mobile 6.0 Professional
- CPU: Samsung SC32442A ARM Processor at 400 MHz; GPU: ATI Imageon 2282
- Memory: 64 MB RAM; 128 MB ROM
- Removable storage: WM5 microSD; WM6 microSD & microSDHC
- Battery: 1300 or 1350 mAH Lithium-ion polymer battery, user accessible
- Rear camera: 1.9 megapixel rear
- Display: 240×320 px, 2.8 in (71 mm), 65536 color LCD, 3:4 aspect ratio
- Connectivity: USB Mini-B; Headphone jack Bluetooth 2.0 + EDR; IrDA; Wi-Fi (802.11b/g)
- Data inputs: QWERTY Keyboard, Touchscreen

The HTC TyTN (also known as the HTC Hermes and the HTC P4500) is an Internet-enabled Windows Mobile Pocket PC PDA designed and marketed by High Tech Computer Corporation of Taiwan. It has a touchscreen with a left-side slide-out QWERTY keyboard. The TyTN's functions include those of a camera phone and a portable media player in addition to text messaging and multimedia messaging. It also offers Internet services such as e-mail (including Microsoft's DirectPush push e-mail solution, as well as BlackBerry services with applications provided by BlackBerry-partnered carriers), instant messaging, web browsing, and local Wi-Fi connectivity. It is a quad-band GSM phone with GPRS, and EDGE, and a single/dual band UMTS phone with HSDPA. It is a part of the first line of PDAs directly marketed and sold by HTC. On AT&T/Cingular, the TyTN was the successor to the HTC Wizard, known as the Cingular 8125. Also on AT&T, the TyTN was superseded by the HTC TyTN II, known as the AT&T 8925 and the AT&T Tilt.

== Versions ==
Besides the branding differences, there are several models of the HTC TyTN: the TyTN 100, the TyTN 200, and the TyTN 300. The TyTN 100 has no front-facing camera or a .1-megapixel front-facing camera; the TyTN 200 has a .1-megapixel front-facing camera; and the TyTN 300 has a .3-megapixel front-facing camera.

The TyTN Model was sold as:

- HTC TyTN 100
  - AT&T/Cingular 8525 (US)
  - Dopod 838Pro (Asia)
  - i-mate JASJAM (Middle East)
  - NTT DoCoMo hTc Z (Japan)
  - O2 XDA Trion
  - Orange United Kingdom SPV M3100
  - Qtek 9600
- HTC TyTN 200
  - Dopod CHT 9000
  - HTC TyTN P4500
  - SoftBank X01HT (Japan)
  - Swisscom XPA v1605
  - Vodafone v1605 (Europe)
  - Vodafone VPA Compact III
- HTC TyTN 300
  - T-Mobile MDA Vario II

== ROM updates ==
The TyTN shipped with Windows Mobile 5 AKU 2.3. HTC released AKU3 ROMs to carriers, though it was up to the carriers to provide updates to end users. In July 2007, HTC released a generic update to Windows Mobile 6, freely available to the public. In November 2007, AT&T released an update to Windows Mobile 6.

Official ROM updates are or were available for several versions of the TyTN, including the AT&T/Cingular 8525, the Dopod 838Pro, the i-mate JASJAM, the O2 XDA Trion, and the Orange SPV M3100 (AKU 3.3.0). Some of these updates update the TyTN to Windows Mobile 5 AKU 3.n.n, others update it to Windows Mobile 6.

== Specifications ==
- Screen size: 2.88 in (73 mm)
- Screen resolution: 240×320 pixels at 139 ppi, 4:3 aspect ratio, flips into 320x240 landscape mode when keyboard is slid out.
- Screen colors: 65536 (16-bit) colors
- Input devices: Touchscreen interface, slide-out QWERTY keyboard, and jog wheel
- Battery: 1300 or 1350 mAh, user-accessible
- Battery has up to 5–6 hours of talk on 3G network and up to 250 hours of standby.
- 1.9 megapixel camera with fixed focus lens, LED flash, self-portrait mirror, and macro mode
- Location finding by detection of cell towers and Wi-Fi networks (through Google Maps Mobile)
- Samsung SC32442A (400 MHz ARM ARM920T processor)
- ATI Imageon Graphics Processing Unit
- RAM: 64 MB DRAM
- ROM: 128 MB flash memory
- Removable Media: microSD, up to 8GB (microSDHC, up to 32 GB if running Windows Mobile 6)
- Operating System: Windows Mobile 5.0 stock ROM with Windows Mobile 6 available to upgrade through HTC e-Club. Unofficial cooked roms for Windows Mobile 6.5 available.
- Quad band GSM / GPRS / EDGE (GSM 850, GSM 900, GSM 1800, GSM 1900)
- Tri band HSDPA (UMTS 850, UMTS 1900, UMTS 2100) A UMTS 800 band option appears on some updated phones, but has not been confirmed to work.
- Wi-Fi (802.11b/g)
- Bluetooth 2.0 + EDR
- Mini USB combo jack for data transfer, charging, and multi-purpose headset.
- Stereo headphone jack (certain models only?)
- IrDA
- Size: 112.5 mm (4.43 in) (h) 58 mm (2.3 in) (w) 21.95 mm (0.864 in) (d)
- Weight: 176 g (6.2 oz)

== Pre-loaded software ==
(Varies by operator)

AT&T 8525 and Cingular 8525

- AOL Instant Messenger
- ClearVUE PDF
- Excel Mobile
- Good Mobile Messaging
- Pocket MSN
- PowerPoint Mobile
- Smart dialing
- TeleNav
- Windows Live Instant Messenger
- Word Mobile
- Xpress Mail
- Yahoo! Instant Messenger

== Notes ==
The TyTN has a GPS receiver, however it has no GPS antenna and the GPS is disabled both in ROM and physically through disconnection of certain pins on the circuit.

Early models of the TyTN (HT624xxx - HT632xxx) have been known to suffer from screen alignment problems and should be avoided.

== See also ==
- HTC Wizard
- HTC TyTN II
- High Tech Computer Corporation

== Discussion forums ==
- HowardForums HTC Forum
- HowardForums Windows Mobile Professional Forum
- HTCGeeks Forum
- PDAPhoneHome HTC TyTN Forum
- PPCGeeks HTC TyTN Forum
- XDA-Developers HTC TyTN Forum
