= HTC Wizard =

Smartphone designed by High Tech Computer Corporation

HTC Wizard (Wizard 200 pictured)
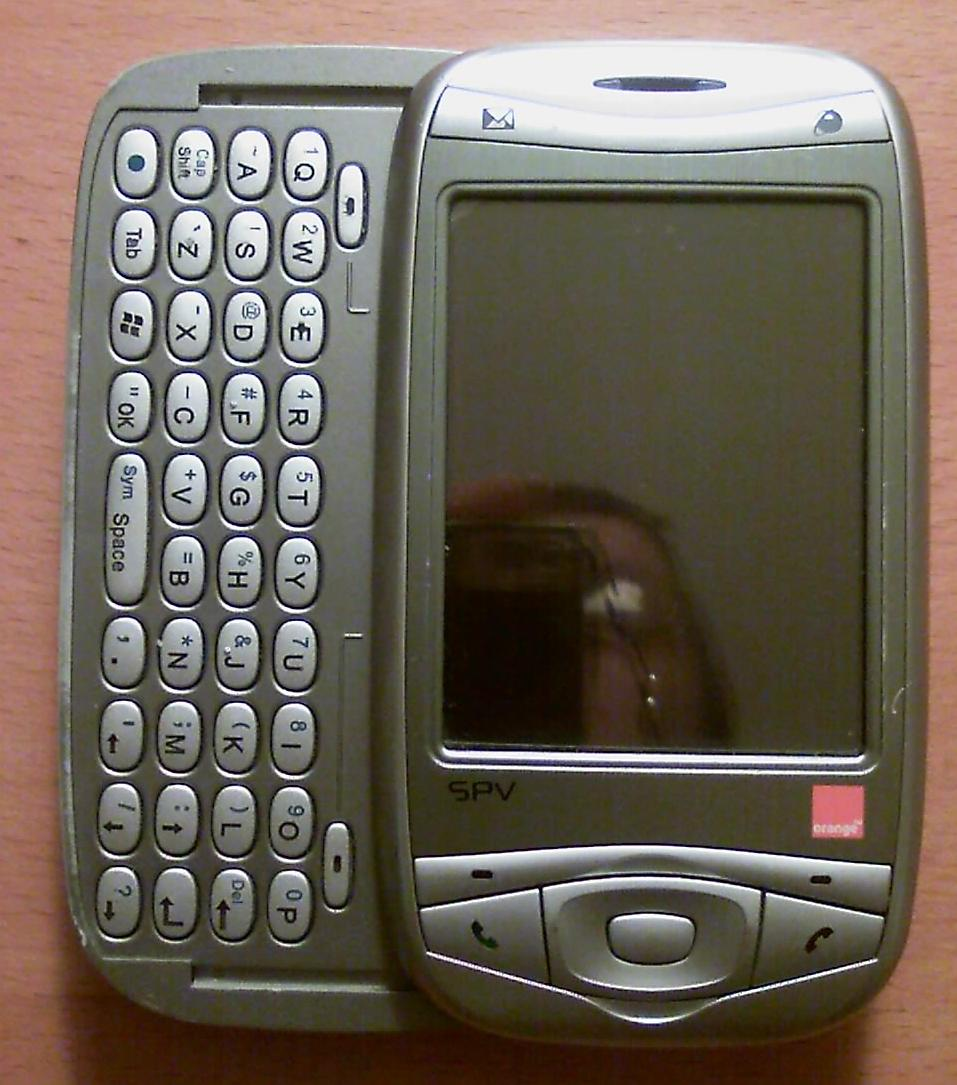
- Manufacturer: High Tech Computer Corporation
- Availability by region: October 2005
- Successor: HTC P4350, HTC TyTN
- Compatible networks: Quad band GSM 850 900 1800 1900, GPRS, EDGE
- Form factor: PDA, Smartphone
- Dimensions: 108 mm (4.3 in) (h); 58 mm (2.3 in) (w); 23.7 mm (0.93 in) (d)
- Weight: Wizard 100: 165 g (5.8 oz); Wizard 110: 168 g (5.9 oz); Wizard 200: 169 g (6.0 oz)
- Operating system: Windows Mobile 5.0
- CPU: TI OMAP 850 ARM Processor at 195 MHz
- Memory: 64 MB RAM; 128 MB ROM
- Removable storage: miniSD, up to 2 GB
- Battery: 1250 mAH Lithium-ion battery, user accessible
- Rear camera: 1.3 megapixel rear
- Display: 240×320 px, 2.8 in (71 mm), 65536 color LCD, 3:4 aspect ratio
- Connectivity: USB Mini-AB; 2.5mm Headphone jack Bluetooth 2.0; IrDA; Wi-Fi (802.11b/g)
- Data inputs: QWERTY Keyboard and Touchscreen

The HTC Wizard (also known as the HTC Prodigy and the HTC P4300) is an Internet-enabled Windows Mobile Pocket PC smartphone designed by High Tech Computer Corporation of Taiwan. It has a touchscreen with a left-side slide-out QWERTY keyboard. The Wizard's functions include those of a camera phone and a portable media player in addition to text messaging and multimedia messaging. It also offers Internet services including e-mail, instant messaging, web browsing, and local Wi-Fi connectivity. It is a quad-band GSM phone with GPRS and EDGE. There are variants which differ in the design of the case, the keyboard and the presence of an on-board camera. On AT&T/Cingular, the Wizard was superseded by the HTC TyTN, known as the AT&T/Cingular 8525. On T-Mobile USA, the Wizard was superseded by the HTC P4350, known as the T-Mobile Wing.

== Versions ==
Besides the branding differences, there are several models of the HTC Wizard. The Wizard 100 model has a squared design with square keys. The Wizard 110 model is physically similar to the 100 model, and contains the same technical features, with the exception of a camera. The Wizard 200 model is the most common model, and has a rounded design with rounded keys.

The Wizard model was sold as:

- HTC Wizard 100
  - Cingular 8100 (US)
- HTC Wizard 110
  - Cingular 8125 (US)
  - Dopod 838 (Asia)
  - HTC P4300
  - Qtek A9100 (Latin America)
  - Vodafone VPA Compact II
- HTC Wizard 200
  - i-mate K-Jam (Middle East)
  - O2 Xda Mini Pro
  - O2 Xda Mini S (Europe)
  - Orange (brand) SPV M3000 (Europe)
  - Qtek 9100 (Europe)
  - T-Mobile MDA (US)
  - T-Mobile MDA Vario (Europe)

== ROM updates ==
Official ROM updates are or were available for several versions of the Wizard, including the Cingular 8125 (AKU 2.2.0), the Dopod 838, the i-mate K-Jam (AKU 2.0.0), the O2 XDA Mini S (AKU 2.0.0), the Qtek 9100 (AKU 2.0.0), the T-Mobile MDA US (AKU 2.3.0), and the T-Mobile MDA Vario. These ROM updates often include a new adaptation kit upgrade which adds features and fixes bugs.

Unofficial and unsupported updates to Windows Mobile 6.5 exist. However, a Wizard must be Carrier Identification (CID) unlocked before flashing to one of these ROMs or flashing to another carrier's ROM (for example, flashing a T-Mobile MDA with a ROM for the Cingular 8125). There are two models of the Wizard: G3 and G4. The procedures for CID and SIM unlocking each model are different. Following the wrong procedure or attempting to flash a Wizard that has not been CID unlocked could result in a permanently inoperable phone.

== Specifications ==
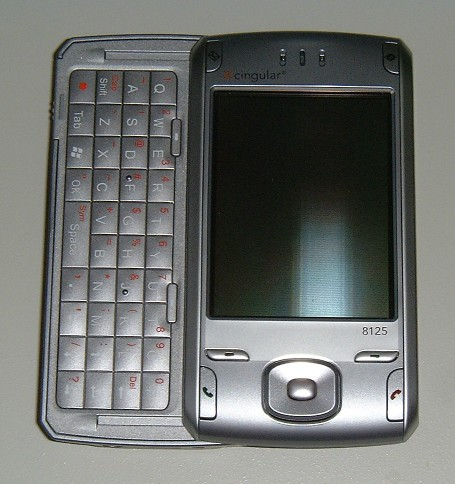
An HTC Wizard 110

- Screen size: 2.8 in (71 mm)
- Screen resolution: 240×320 pixels at 143 ppi, with 4:3 aspect ratio
- Screen colors: 65,536 (16-bit)
- Input devices: Touchscreen interface (only portrait) and slide-out QWERTY keyboard
- Stylus hidden in the right-hand corner of the phone
- Battery: 1250 mAh, user-accessible
- Battery has up to 5 hours of talk and up to 200 hours of standby.
- 1.3 megapixel camera with fixed lens, LED flash, and self-portrait mirror
- Location finding by detection of cell towers and Wi-Fi networks (through Google Maps Mobile)
- TI OMAP 850 (195 MHz ARM 926EJ-S processor)
- RAM: 64 MB DRAM
- ROM: 128 MB flash memory (with about 47 MB to 60 MB available for user storage depending on the system load, this is adjustable)
- Removable Media: miniSD, up to 4 GB (Non High Capacity Card)
- Operating System: Windows Mobile 5.0
- Quad band GSM / GPRS / EDGE Class 10 (GSM 850, GSM 900, GSM 1800, GSM 1900)
- Wi-Fi (802.11b/g)
- Bluetooth 2.0
- Mini USB (device-mode only, no host)
- 2.5mm stereo headphone jack
- IrDA
- Size: 108 mm (4.3 in) (h), 58 mm (2.3 in) (w), 23.7 mm (0.93 in) (d)
- Weight: Wizard 100 165 g (5.8 oz), Wizard 110 168 g (5.9 oz), Wizard 200 169 g (6.0 oz)
- Speaker Stereo

== Alternative operating system support ==
In 2006 the Linwizard Project was started with the aim of replacing Windows Mobile with Embedded Linux and a GPE/OPIE window manager. The Linux kernel has been successfully booted, and Kdrive (X Windowing system) runs. The linwizard team is currently in the process of adding driver support for the various devices present in the Wizard. The latest devices working include the touchscreen and a GSM driver.

== See also ==
- HTC Atlas (T-Mobile Wing US)
- HTC TyTN (AT&T 8525)
- HTC TyTN II (AT&T 8925/Tilt)
- HTC Touch Pro
