= Orange SPV =

2002 series of smartphones

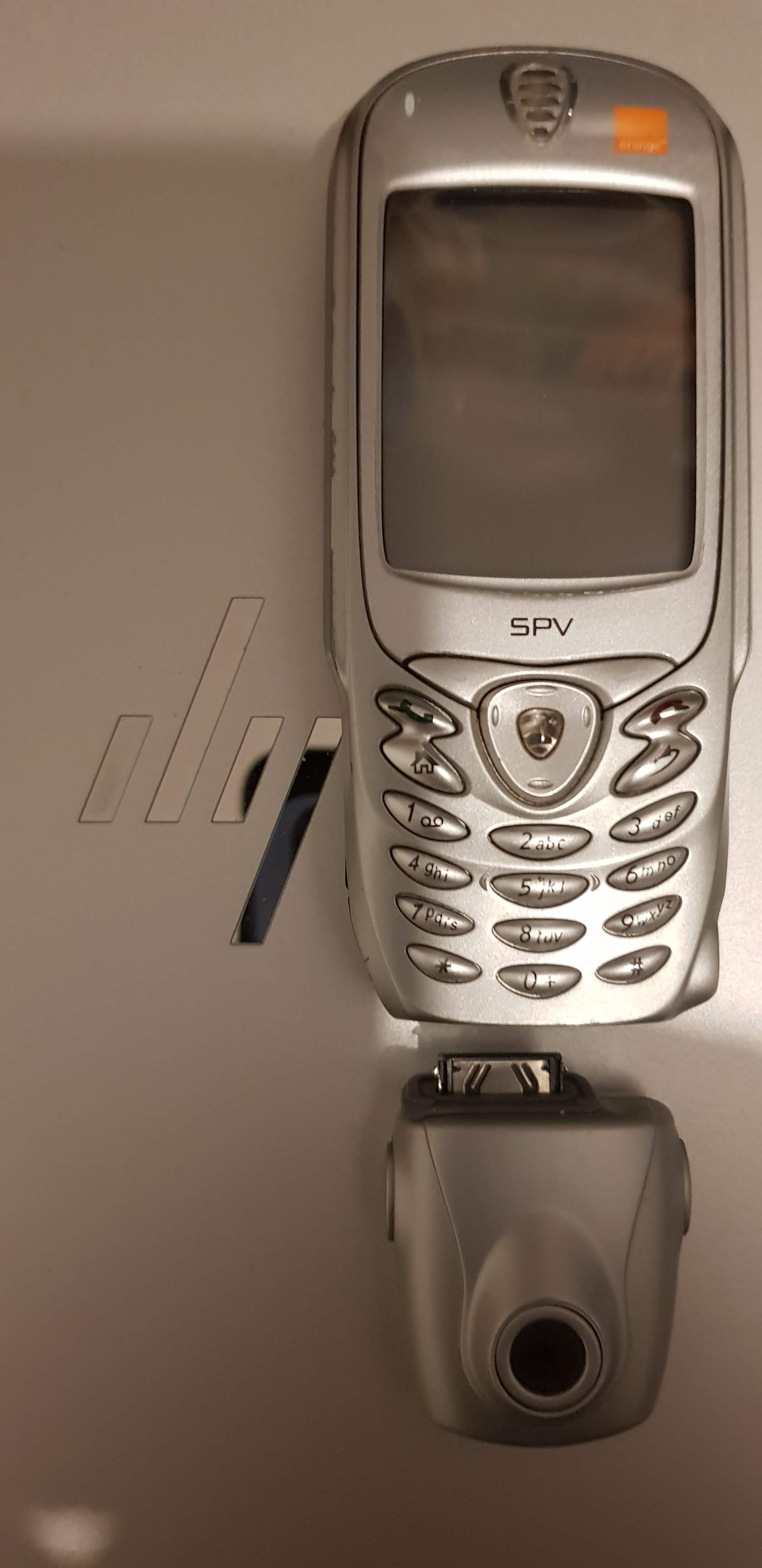
Orange SPV Classic with attachable camera

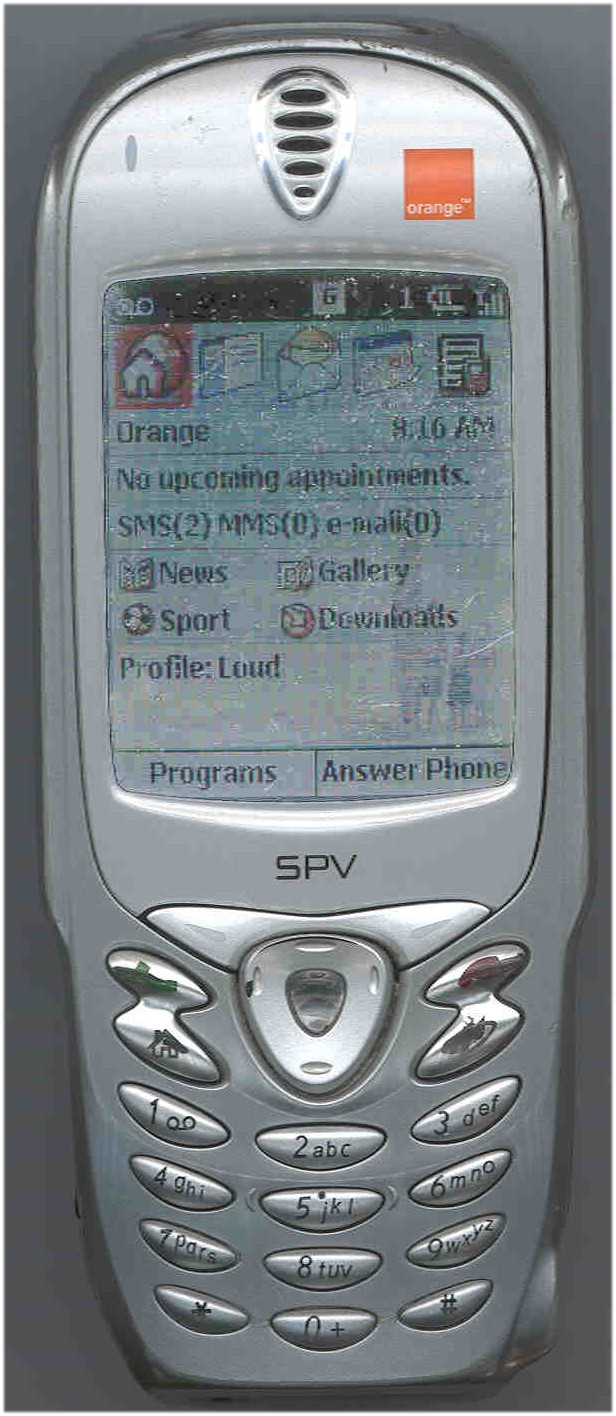
Orange SPV Classic with wear and tear

Orange SPV was a series of smartphones built by HTC and Amoi for the European mobile operator, Orange.

The first HTC model was installed with Microsoft Windows Mobile 2002 and launched late 2002. SPV stood for Sound, Pictures, Video, with the emphasis being on the device's multimedia capabilities and potential. It came with a Texas Instruments OMAP710 processor which clocked in at a speed of 132 MHz. An internal memory of 16 MB RAM and 32 MB of Flash ROM was complemented with the addition of a Secure Digital storage card.

It was most notable as being the first Windows smartphone to be released and was greeted with much anticipation. The phone carried mini versions of such desktop applications as Outlook, Media Player and Internet Explorer alongside advanced calendar, task and contact management facilities, so focused on the business user segment.

Another of the main selling points of the phone at the time was the display, which had a reflective TFT screen producing 65,000 colours at 176 x 220 pixels resolution. The one drawback to all this in models before the E200 was the lack of a built in camera, something that was becoming increasingly common and popular on much less capable phones.

With a length of 11 cm, width 4.5 cm and a depth of 2 cm, it weighed just 95 g.

Various Orange SPV models were released until 2007.

== Release history and specifications ==
Orange Model	Manufacturer Model	OS	Released	CPU	Speed-MHz	RAM-Mb	Flash ROM-Mb	Screen
SPV Classic	HTC Canary	SP2001	Nov 2002	TI OMAP 710	132	16	32	176 X 220
SPV E100	HTC Tanager	SP2002	---	TI OMAP 710	132	16	32	176 X 220
SPV E200	HTC Voyager	SP2003	---	TI OMAP 710	132	32	64	176 X 220
SPV C100	HTC Oxygen	Windows Mobile 5.0	Aug 2006	TI OMAP 850	200	64	64	176 X 220
SPV C200	Amoi E72	Windows Mobile 5.0	Jul 2007	TI OMAP 1710	220	64	64	176 X 220
SPV C500	HTC Typhoon	SP2003SE	---	TI OMAP 730	200	32	64	176 X 220
SPV C550	HTC Hurricane	SP2003SE	---	TI OMAP 750	200	64	64	240 X 320
SPV C600	HTC Faraday	Windows Mobile 5.0	Dec 2005	TI OMAP 850	200	64	64	240 X 320
SPV C600E	HTC Tornado	Windows Mobile 5.0	2006	TI OMAP 850	200	64	64	240 X 320
SPV C700	HTC Meteor	Windows Mobile 5.0	Cancelled	Samsung 2442	300	64	128	240 X 320
SPV M500	HTC Magician	Windows Mobile 2003	2005	Intel XScale Bulverde PXA272	416	64	64	240 X 320
SPV M600	HTC Prophet	Windows Mobile 5.0	Apr 2006	TI OMAP 850	200	64	128	240 X 320
SPV M650	HTC Artemis	Windows Mobile 5.0	2007	TI OMAP 850	200	64	128	240 X 320
SPV M700	HTC Trinity	Windows Mobile 5.0	2007	Samsung SC32442	400	64	128	240 X 320
SPV E600	HTC Excalibur	Windows Mobile 5.0 / 6.0	2006	TI OMAP 850	200	64	128	320 X 240
SPV E610	Amoi 6711	Windows Mobile 5.0	2007	TI OMAP V1030	260	64	128	320 X 240
SPV E650	HTC Vox	Windows Mobile 6 Standard	Mar 2007	TI OMAP 850	200	64	128	240 X 320
SPV M1000	HTC Himalaya	Windows Mobile 2003	2004	Intel XScale Bulverde PXA263	400	64	128	240 X 320
SPV M1500	HTC Alpine	Windows Mobile 2003 SE	2004	Intel XScale Bulverde PXA272	520	128	128	240 X 320
SPV M2000	HTC Blue Angel	Windows Mobile 2003 SE	2004	Intel XScale Bulverde PXA263	400	128	96	240 X 320
SPV M2500	HTC Alpine	Windows Mobile 2003 SE	2005	Intel XScale Bulverde PXA272	520	128	128	240 X 320
SPV M3000	HTC Wizard 200	Windows Mobile 5.0	2005	TI OMAP 850	200	64	128	240 X 320
SPV M3100	HTC Hermes	Windows Mobile 5.0	2006	Samsung SC32442	400	64	128	240 X 320
SPV M5000	HTC Universal	Windows Mobile 5.0	2005	Intel XScale Bulverde PXA270	520	64	128	640 X 480
