= Resco =

Resco, spol. s r.o.
- Type: Private
- Industry: Mobile software development
- Founded: Slovakia (1999)
- Headquarters: Bratislava, Slovakia
- Key people: Radomir Vozar, Eduard Kirchner, Marcel Saffa
- Products: Resco Mobile CRM for Microsoft Dynamics CRM, Resco CRM, Mobile Apps for Microsoft Dynamics CRM, CRM Glass, MobileForms Toolkit
- Website: RESCO.net

Resco spol. s r.o. is an IT company with headquarters in Bratislava, Slovakia that was founded in 1999 by Radomir Vozar, Eduard Kirchner and Marcel Saffa. As of 2014 the company has grown its customer base up to more than million users and 4000 corporations. Resco stands for REmote Solutions COmpany.

== History and development ==
In its beginnings, team of Resco developers focused on platforms such as Palm OS, Pocket PC (Standard) and Pocket PC (Professional) known today as Windows Mobile. BlackBerry's RIM OS was not yet included. Applications included Resco Explorer, Resco Photo Viewer, Resco Radio and Resco Audio Recorder, which received awards from PDA journals such as Pocket PC Magazine. In 2004 Resco published their first application for Nokia's Symbian OS (Resco Photo Viewer for Symbian 6.1), and last version of it released in 2010 (Photo Viewer 6.0 for Symbian 9.x). The genesis and growing popularity of new mobile platforms in 2009 and 2010 has become a motivation for Resco to completely change the company's heading and strategy. The development on four former mobile platforms was stopped and at the end of the year 2010 Resco introduced their first application for Android and Windows Phone 7 (Resco Radio).

In 2013, Resco.net, Inc. — the US subsidiary of Resco was launched, the same time a new product: Resco Advantage (later renamed to Resco CRM) was introduced to the world as a brand new, standalone Mobile CRM solution.

In July 2019, Miro Pomsar became the CEO, taking over from Radomir Vozar, one of the founders.

In May 2022, Andrew Lorraine became the CEO.

In August 2025, Resco announced the appointment of Ivan Stano as its CEO.

== See also ==
- Mobile application development
- .NET Compact Framework
- .NET Compact Framework controls
- Mono (software)
