= HTC P4350 =

Pocket PC smartphone by HTC

HTC P4350 (T-Mobile Wing) (XDA Terra)
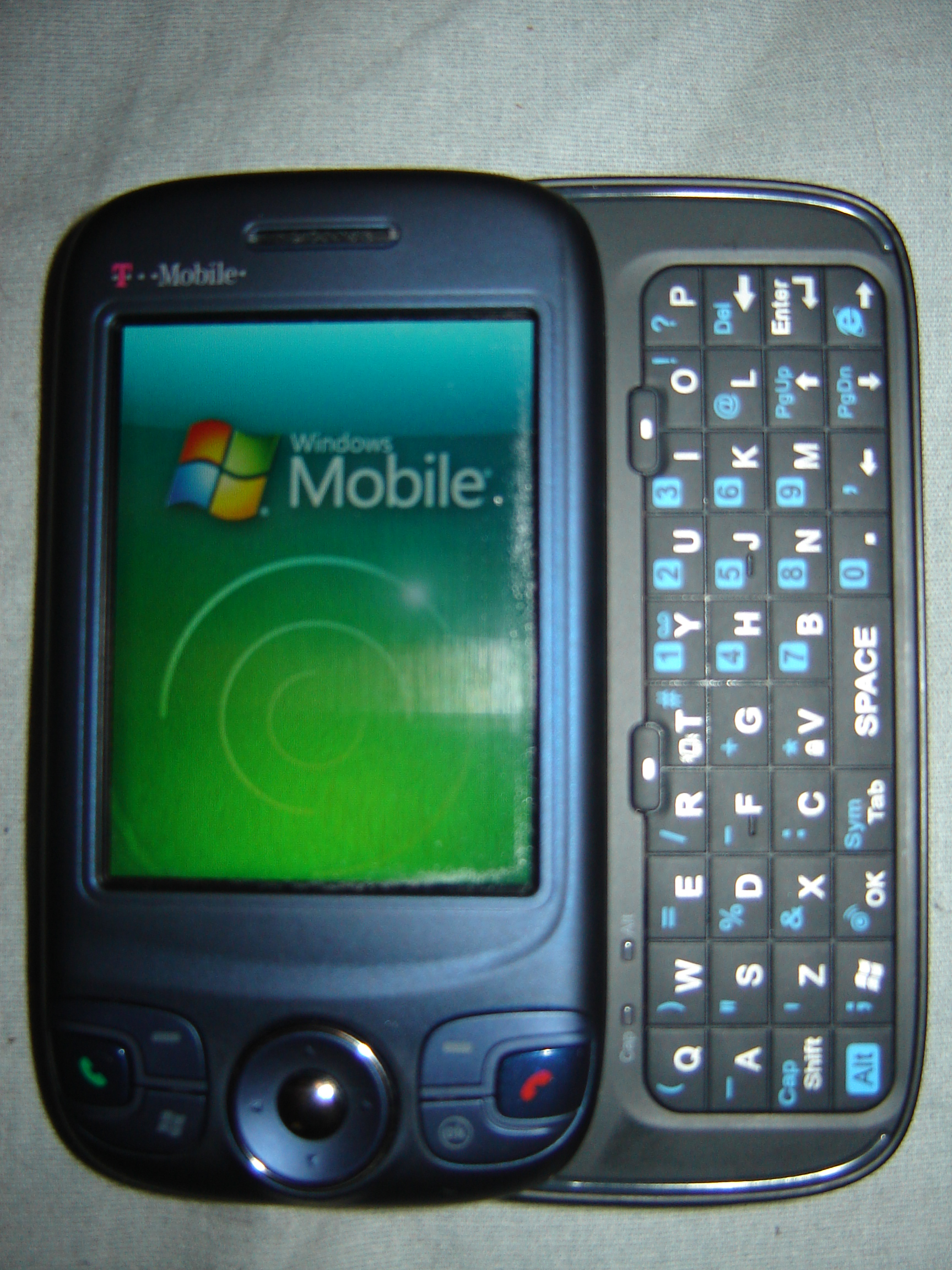
- T-Mobile Wing version of the HTC P4350
- Manufacturer: High Tech Computer Corporation as "HTC Atlas"
- Type: Pocket PC
- Predecessor: HTC Wizard
- Successor: HTC TyTN II
- Dimensions: 2.3×4.3×0.7 in (58×109×18 mm)
- Weight: 6 oz
- Operating system: Windows Mobile 6.0; Pocket PC Phone Edition
- CPU: OMAP 850 201MHz
- Memory: 64 MB RAM; 128 MB flash 16-bit data bus
- Storage: 39.44 MB
- Removable storage: MicroSD
- Battery: Li-ion polymer battery
- Display: 240x320 resolution

The HTC P4350 is a Pocket PC smartphone manufactured by High Tech Computer Corporation (HTC) of Taiwan. It is also known as the HTC Herald, T-Mobile Wing, and XDA Terra. An updated model running Windows Mobile 6, the HTC P4351, has been sold as the HTC Atlas. It features a right-side QWERTY slide and runs the Windows Mobile 6.0/6.1 Professional Edition operating system.

== Basics ==
Size: 2.3 x 4.3 x 0.7 inches
Weight: 6 ounces
Internal battery: Li-Ion polymer
Talk time: up to 4 hours
Standby time: up to 6 days
Band (frequency): 850 MHz; 900MHz;1800MHz; 1900 MHz

== Features ==
- Windows Mobile 6.0/6.1 (P4351 and P4350 under some licenses) or Windows Mobile 5 (P4350)
- Built-in right side QWERTY Keypad
- GPRS/EDGE and Wi-Fi enabled
- 2.0-megapixel camera (2.0 After Quality Loss from origin 2.3)
- E-mail
- myFaves capable
- Voice-activated functions
- MicroSD memory slot (P4351: MicroSDHC)
- Bluetooth wireless technology
- Video camera
- Picture messaging
- Real web browsing
- Instant messaging: Yahoo!, MSN, and AOL
- Quad-band world phone (850/900/1800/1900 MHz)
- Text messaging
- Speaker phone
- Wireless calendar synchronization with Outlook
- Windows Media Player

== Services ==
- Call Forwarding
- Call Waiting
- Caller ID
- Customer Care
- Emergency Calls

== Messaging ==
Instant messaging: Yahoo!, MSN, and AOL instant messaging, and text messaging. For Google GTalk users, there is a Java-based free client available, called MGtalk. The HTC P4350 can connect to Microsoft Office Communication Server using the Office Communicator 2007 Mobile client which allows chat with users on corporate network and access to a corporate address book.

The VoIP client Skype works well on WiFi, but it will inhibit performance of the device. WiFi drains the battery quickly.

It has Outlook Mobile as email client, which works well with most of the email service providers and supports standard protocols like POP, IMAP, SMTP. The push-mail functionality works with Exchange 2003 SP2, Exchange 2007 and above email servers using the ActiveSync protocol.

The P4350 is equipped with a slide out qwerty keyboard.
