= Sendo X =

Model of phone

- Manufacturer: Sendo
- Successor: Sendo X2 (canceled)
- Compatible networks: GSM 900; GSM 1800; GSM 1900; GPRS
- Weight: 120 g (4.2 oz)
- Operating system: S60
- GPU: GraphiX
- Memory: 32MB
- Storage: 32MB
- Removable storage: MMC, SD card
- Rear camera: VGA (640x480) with 4x digital zoom and red-eye reduction
- Display: TFT, 65K colors with 176 x 220 pixels (2.2 inches, 35 x 44 mm)
- Connectivity: Bluetooth, IrDA, USB
- Other: Flashlight, Java support

The Sendo X was Sendo's first Series 60 based "high-end" phone, developed after Sendo switched from the Microsoft to Symbian / Series 60 platforms.

Among the unique features of the Sendo X, one was the ability for users to download new firmware from Sendo's website and upgrade the phone from their home computer.

== Background ==
Sendo shunted multiple times the Sendo Z100 to new release dates, and after cancelling the phone in November 2002 they announced to switch from Microsoft's Smartphone 2002 operating system to the Series 60 platform.

This decision resulted in the 2004Q2 release of the Sendo X.

The phone was made by Celestica in the Czech Republic, however at least some model number stickers mention "Made in the Netherlands", referring to their distribution centre in Arnhem, in the Netherlands..

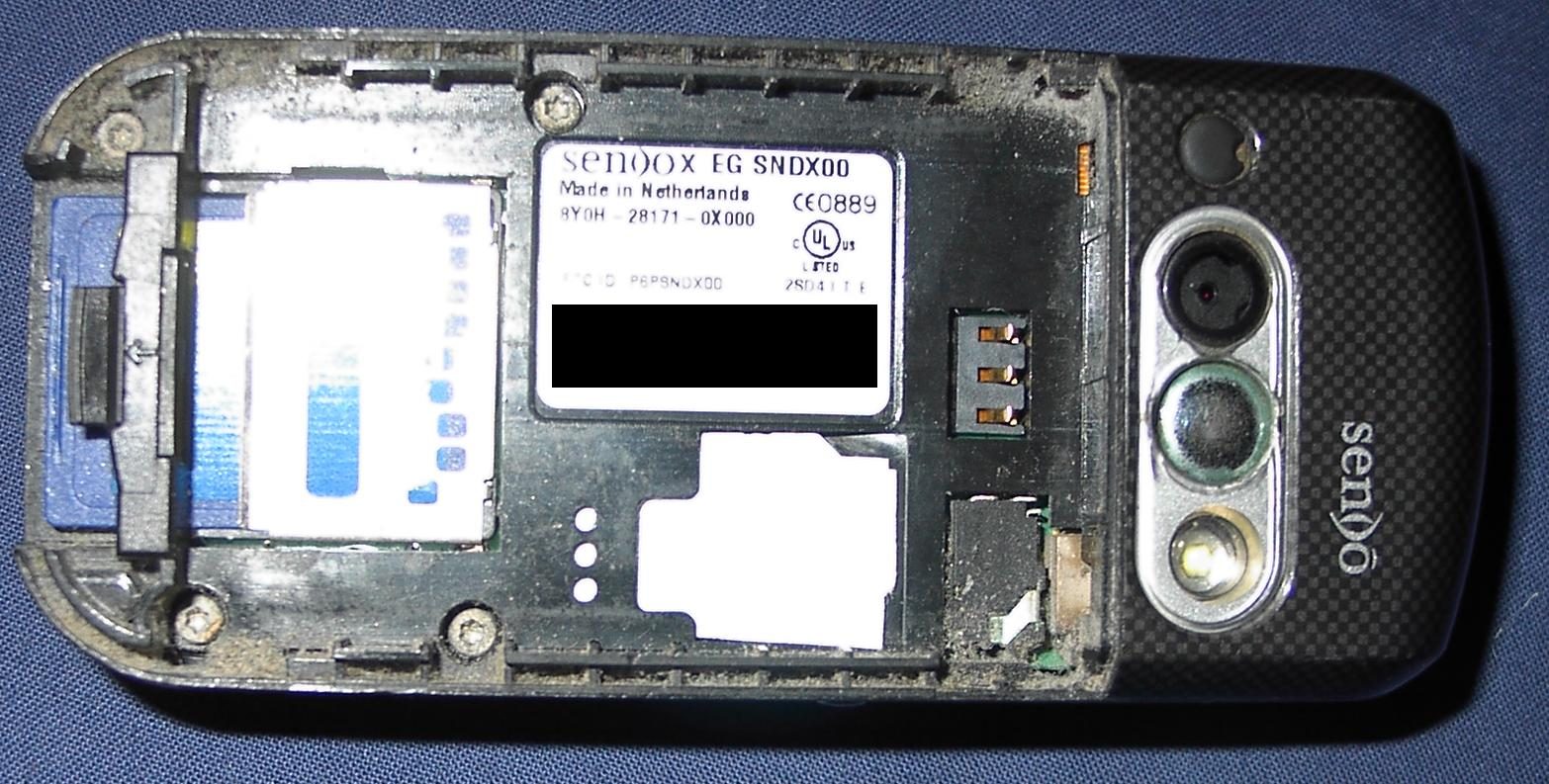
Battery compartment of heavily used Sendo X mobile phone

== Software ==
Sendo Pinball and Funny Farmer.

Sendo licensed Opera Mobile 6.2 and updates worked until version 8.0

== Reception ==
Mobilegazette.com was impressed with the feature richness without being over-bloated and called the phone stylish.
