= Windows Marketplace for Mobile =

Digital distribution service

Marketplace

- Marketplace main screen displayed on a Windows Mobile device
- Developer: Microsoft
- Operating system: Windows Mobile 6.x
- Successor: Windows Phone Store
- Type: Digital distribution
- License: Proprietary
- Website: n/a

Windows Marketplace for Mobile was a digital distribution service by Microsoft for its Windows Mobile platform that allowed users to browse and download applications that had been developed by third parties. The app store began operation on 6 October 2009, featuring an initial 246 applications. It was available for Windows Mobile 6.x (i.e. 6.5, 6.1 and 6.0) devices, which includes smartphones and personal digital assistants.

Microsoft's next generation mobile platform named Windows Phone, which was released in 2010, had a separate app store called Windows Phone Store (which itself discontinued in 2020); WM6.x apps are not compatible with WP7. Marketplace for Mobile was shut down on May 22, 2012.

== Pricing and features ==
Windows Marketplace for Mobile, available through applications for Windows Mobile and personal computers, offered a 24-hour return policy for buyers, and 70% of each application sale was paid to developers. A one-time $99 USD fee for developers to list an unlimited number of paid applications or up to five free applications yearly in the store was charged by Microsoft. After five free applications were listed for the year, each additional free application could be listed for a $19.99 USD fee. Microsoft accepted payment from buyers through credit cards and carrier charges.

Students who were members of Microsoft's DreamSpark program could submit applications to the store for free, waiving the $99 USD fee.

Carriers had the ability to create a branded section of the store to market carrier-specific applications and services for their customers.

== Content restrictions ==
Microsoft did not distribute certain types of apps, including those with sexual content, via the Marketplace. Banned applications include:

- Sex and nudity – Images that are suggestive or sexual (e.g. sexually provocative touching, bondage) or provocative images that reveal full nudity.
- Any adult or borderline adult content (images or text).
- Content that generally falls under the category of pornography.

== History ==
Rumors about the service began to surface around the internet in September 2008, whereas it was referred to as "Skymarket", and was to appear with the Windows Mobile 7 release. Rumors stemmed from an online job listing from Microsoft's website calling for a "Senior Product Manager".

On February 16, 2009, Microsoft made an official announcement for the service at the 2009 Mobile World Congress for use with upcoming Windows Mobile 6.5 devices. The company then announced that availability of the service would be by the end of 2009.

The store opened for business on 6 October 2009, featuring 246 applications. Initially it was available only for Windows Mobile 6.5, and was made available to older 6.x versions a few weeks later.

On November 12, 2009, the Marketplace web application was opened.

The Marketplace website announced in mid-2011: "On July 15th [2011] this website will no longer offer Windows Mobile 6.x applications for download. If you have a Windows Mobile 6.x phone you can continue accessing the application store from the Marketplace client on your phone. ... [you must] sign into Marketplace for Mobile on your phone ... to buy apps". It was later announced that Marketplace for Mobile would be discontinued on May 9, 2012.

On July 15, 2011, Microsoft announced that they will no longer be accepting submissions for new applications or updates to existing ones.

== See also ==
- List of digital distribution platforms for mobile devices
