= HTC Artemis =

Windows Mobile PDA/phone

HTC Artemis or P3300 is a Windows Mobile 5.0 Pocket PC Phone Edition based pocket pc/phone manufactured by High Tech Computer. The device supports GPS, GPRS EDGE, Bluetooth, WiFi and quad-band GSM connectivity. The device is also sold by mobile phone operators Orange, O2 and T-Mobile, and is then branded Orange SPV M650, O2 Xda Orbit and T-Mobile MDA Compact III, respectively. The latter version lacks WiFi in most countries (including Germany).

== Specifications ==
Function	Component
OS	Microsoft Windows Mobile 5.0 Pocket PC Phone Edition Microsoft Windows Mobile 6 Professional
Processor	TI OMAP850 201 MHz
Memory	Flash ROM: 128 MB, RAM: 64 MB, MicroSD
Screen	2.8", 64 000 colors, TFT LCD, 240x320
Dimensions	108 x 58 x 16.8 mm
Battery	Lithium-Ion 1350 mAh
GSM	850, 900, 1800, 1900
Communication	GSM, GPRS, GPS, EDGE
GPS	SiRFstarIII, 20 Channels, Garmin Mobile XT For Windows Mobile V.5.00.20W
Connections	USB, Bluetooth 2.0, IEEE 802.11b, IEEE 802.11g,
Camera	2.0 Mpix, video
Stylus	Yes
