= Windows Phone Store =

Digital distribution platform for Windows Phone

- Windows Phone Store shown on Windows Phone 8.1
- Developer: Microsoft
- Release: October 21, 2010; 16 years ago
- Operating system: Windows Phone 7 Windows Phone 8 Windows Phone 8.1 Windows 10 Mobile
- Successor: Microsoft Store
- Type: App store
- License: Proprietary
- Website: www.microsoft.com/store/apps/windows-phone

Windows Phone Store was a digital distribution platform developed by Microsoft for the Windows Phone. It allowed publishers to release apps which could be downloaded to users smartphones.

The app store was initially launched as Windows Phone Marketplace alongside Windows Phone 7 in October 2010. With the rollout of Windows Phone 7.5, Microsoft unveiled the Marketplace, which offered over-the-air installation of apps. In August 2012, Microsoft renamed the Marketplace to Windows Phone Store. In July 2015, the Windows Phone Store was replaced by the Windows Store, which would act as a unified solution for all Windows-powered devices. This process was complemented by the Apps on Windows website, an interim solution before the unified Windows Store. The Windows Phone Store shut down for Windows Phone 8.1 systems on December 16, 2019.

== Pricing and features ==
Windows Phone Store supported credit card purchases, operator billing, and ad-supported content. The store also featured a "try-before-you-buy" option, where the user had an option to download a trial or demo for a commercial app. Other features are said to be similar to Windows Phone Store's predecessor, Windows Marketplace for Mobile. The Windows Phone Store had 61 categories split up into 16 main categories and 25 sub-categories. Apps could only be placed in one category. Windows Phone Store also featured downloads for 3D games that will have integrated Xbox Live connectivity and features. The ability to download an XAP file to a computer was also present, allowing a user to install an app from their SD card if no internet access was available.

Developers had to pay an annual subscription fee of $99 to become an App Hub member and submit apps to the Windows Phone Store. This, according to Todd Brix, the General Manager for Windows Phone Apps and Store team, was on an ongoing promotion at $19. There was a limit of 100 free submissions for free apps; thereafter, there was a fee of $19.99 per submission for free apps. Developers could also choose to work with OEMs to deploy their apps; this would allow apps to be preinstalled on Windows Phone devices or be exclusive to that specific OEM's products. This process was used by Microsoft Mobile (formerly Nokia) for apps specific to Lumia devices (including Lumia Camera, HERE Maps, and MixRadio). OEM-exclusive apps were deployed and available to end-users in a separate channel available only on OEM-specific hardware. Most Windows Phone OEMs have a category, such as "Lumia Collection" (formerly "Nokia Collection"), "Samsung Zone", "HTC Apps", and "Huawei Selected" for this purpose.

A user could download games and apps from the Windows Phone Store; if an Xbox Live account is enabled, the store could be accessed remotely from the phone itself. Microsoft had lined up a wide range of popular games to be available from the launch of Windows Phone 7. Also at Gamescom, Microsoft unveiled more than 50 premium Windows Phone 7 games and apps that used the Xbox Live mobile connection.

Windows Phone Store grew swiftly since its launch, and by February 2012, it had outgrown BlackBerry App World with 70,000 apps available (a milestone that BlackBerry App World passed in March 2012). In June 2012, after 20 months, the Windows Phone Marketplace had reached 100,000 apps. The growth to achieve 100,000 apps was faster than Android within 24 months, but slower than iOS within 16 months. The number ramped up to 150,000 in December 2012, followed by 200,000 in December 2013. The Windows Phone Store contained more than 300,000 apps in August 2014.

== Content restrictions ==
Apps in Windows Phone Store are subjected to a content policy, which exists to guide app developers, and to facilitate a restriction or banning of certain content. Examples of restricted or banned content include pornography, promotion of violence, discrimination, hate, or the usage of drugs, alcohol and tobacco. Suggestions or depictions of prostitution, sexual fetishes, or generally anything that "a reasonable person would consider to be adult or borderline adult content" are forbidden from the marketplace, even after the unification with Windows Store.

== Windows Phone 7 SDK ==
AppHub

Windows Phone 7 development is based on Silverlight, XNA, and Visual C#. The primary tools used for development are Visual Studio 2010 and Expression Blend. Windows Phone 7 SDK requires Windows Vista (at least) or Windows 7. Excluding unlocked developer devices, Windows Phone 7 only runs mobile apps that have first been approved by Microsoft and are only available via the Windows Phone Store. Developers earn 70% of their app revenue and can include an advertising model built into their apps. However, in some countries, the share is only 56.1% when the customer purchases with methods covered by the Commerce Expansion Adjustment. Students can submit apps free of charge through the DreamSpark program.

== Windows Phone 8 SDK ==
Apps for Windows Phone 8 can be developed either in native code or managed code, using Visual C#, Visual Basic .NET, and Visual C++. Microsoft has deprecated XNA in favor of DirectX for Windows Runtime. The Windows Phone 8 Emulator in the SDK is also changed to use Hyper-V, which requires at least Windows 8 Pro or Windows Server 2012, in addition to hardware-assisted virtualization. In Windows 8 Pro, SLAT is strictly required for Hyper-V. A subset of Windows Runtime objects allows code reuse on Windows 8 and later. A subset of the traditional Windows API is also available. Finally, use of third-party frameworks such as Unity is also supported. For a time, developers could develop Windows Phone 7 apps using the Windows 7 SDK, and they would still be compatible with Windows Phone 8.

== Windows Phone App Studio ==
Windows Phone App Studio was a one-stop source for rapid app building for Windows Phone. With a couple of configuration steps (complying with "separation of concerns"), users can generate a production-ready app for the Windows Store. Once all the configuration and look and feel are set, this online studio lets you publish the app directly to the Windows Phone Store. Windows Phone App Studio makes it significantly easier for non-developers to publish homebrew or small business apps without involving them in source code or hiring a developer, it can be leveraged as a starting point for professional developers for boilerplate code generation. Once all the configuration is made, in addition to publishing the app, the user can download the Visual Studio project for advanced editing. This opens a new paradigm for rapid development, where the developers get initial assertion from clients in the form of a readymade prototype code. The service is free of cost and requires the user to sign in with a Microsoft Account. Windows Phone App Studio was later renamed to Windows App Studio, which serves as a unified app studio across all Windows devices.

== Merger with Windows Store and closure ==
In Q2 2015, Microsoft launched Windows 10 Mobile, at which point the Windows Phone Store was merged with the Windows Store. After this, the store kept operating for Windows Phone 8.x devices until it closed at the end of 2019. Since its closure, Windows Phone 8.x cannot obtain or install software natively without unlocking the device bootloader and sideloading XAPs on compatible hardware.

== See also ==
- List of digital distribution platforms for mobile devices
- Groove Music
- Movies & TV
- Windows Mobile Marketplace
