= HTC TyTN II =

Smartphone model

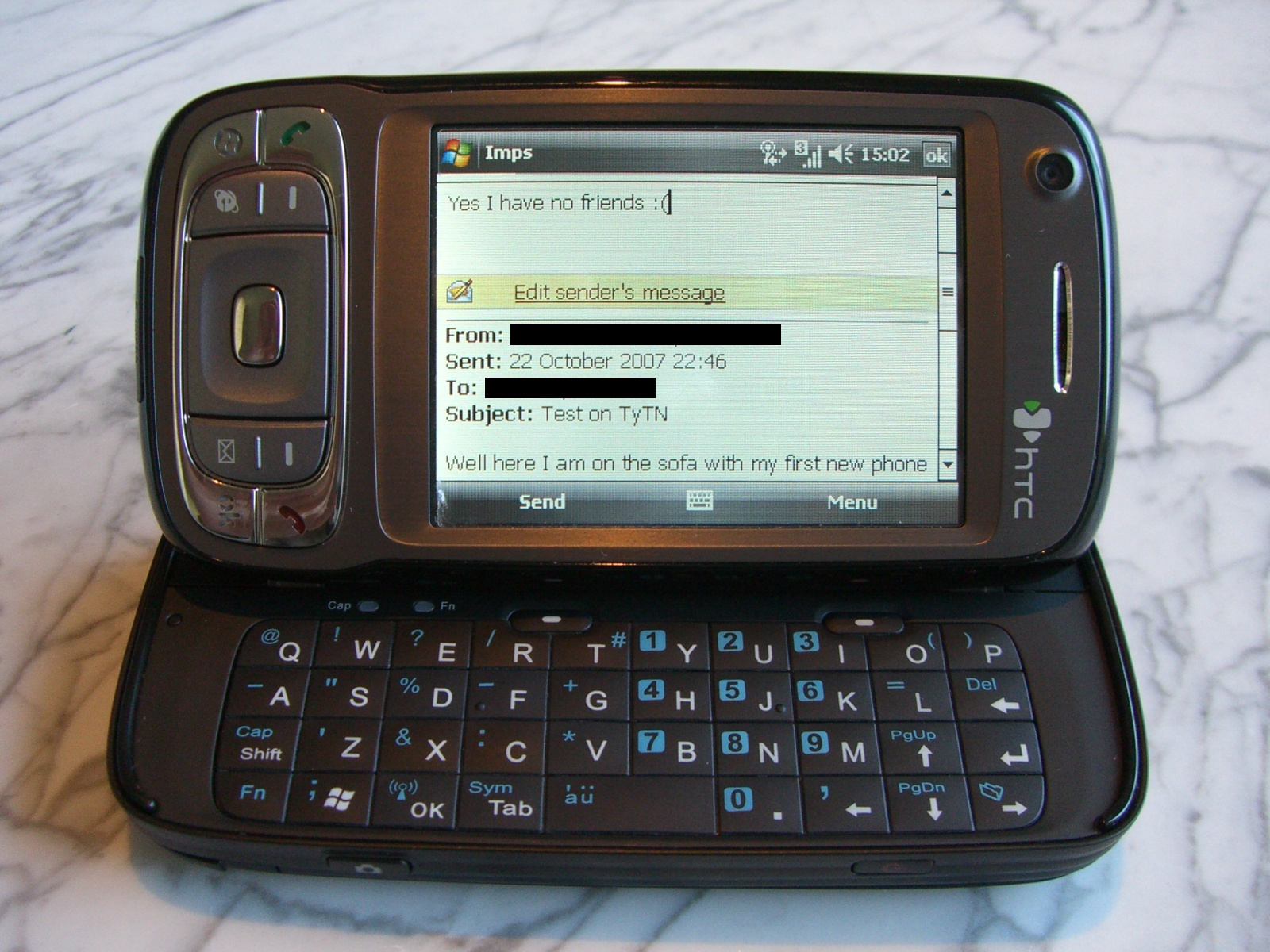
- Manufacturer: HTC Corporation
- Series: HTC TyTN
- Availability by region: September 2007; 18 years ago
- Discontinued: September 3, 2009; 16 years ago
- Predecessor: HTC TyTN
- Successor: HTC Touch Pro
- Compatible networks: Quad band GSM 850/900/1800/1900, GPRS, EDGE; Tri band UMTS 850/1900/2100, HSDPA, HSUPA aGPS
- Form factor: Slider
- Dimensions: 112 mm (4.4 in) H 59 mm (2.3 in) W 19 mm (0.75 in) D
- Weight: 190 g (6.7 oz)
- Operating system: Windows Mobile 6.1, 6.5 (unofficial); Android (unofficial)
- CPU: Qualcomm 7200 ARM 400 MHz; GPU: Qualcomm Q3Dimension
- Memory: 128 MB RAM; 256 MB ROM
- Removable storage: microSDHC, up to 32 GB
- Battery: 1300 or 1350 mAh Lithium-ion polymer battery, user accessible
- Rear camera: 3.1 megapixel
- Front camera: 0.3-megapixel
- Display: 240x320 px, 2.8 in (71 mm), 65536 color LCD, 3:4 aspect ratio
- Connectivity: USB Mini-B; Wi-Fi (802.11b/g); Bluetooth 2.0 + EDR
- Data inputs: QWERTY keyboard and touchscreen

The HTC TyTN II (also known as the HTC Kaiser, the HTC P4550, and the HTC 8925) is an Internet-enabled Windows Mobile Pocket PC smartphone designed and marketed by HTC Corporation of Taiwan. It has a tilting touchscreen with a right-side slide-out QWERTY keyboard. The TyTN II's functions include those of a camera phone and a portable media player in addition to text messaging and multimedia messaging. It also offers Internet services including e-mail, instant messaging, web browsing, and local Wi-Fi connectivity. It is a quad-band GSM phone with GPRS, EDGE, UMTS, HSDPA, and HSUPA.

== Video driver issues ==
Soon after its release to market, reviewers and end users reported the TyTN II's graphical performance was below par. Both 2D and 3D graphics were affected, with notable symptoms being poor video playback and severely low frame-rates when running 3D applications and games. The hardware platform (Qualcomm 7200 chipset) suggested that the device was capable of high graphical performance, however the device was consistently outperformed by older HTC devices.

A community of enthusiast developers investigated the cause of the poor performance and concluded that DirectDraw and Direct3D applications were running in software rendering mode only. No hardware acceleration was taking place, and the drivers required to take advantage of the ATI Imageon hardware appeared to be missing.

Many users within the community were dissatisfied by the apparent omission of a video driver that would allow hardware acceleration of graphics, particularly since the device included rendering hardware which was not being used. In an attempt to elicit interest from developers with relevant expertise, the community began raising a bounty which could be offered to any developer (or team of developers) who could solve the problem by enabling hardware acceleration with a homebrew driver. A website was also established to document and publicize the problem, to pressure HTC to provide a fix, and ultimately start a class action lawsuit against the manufacturer.

At least one developer at HTCClassAction.org is working on getting proper driver support. They have successfully created a driver that enables hardware acceleration under specific circumstances which excludes Fullscreen. Right now the driver enables D3D and OpenGL ES, but it does not solve any 2D drawing problems. The driver does prove that the TyTN II based devices do in fact have functional GPU accelerated hardware, and it is enabled. It is also important to note that these drivers only work on ROMs based on Windows Mobile 6.1.

Some developers are now working to enable 2D DDI support for the Polaris, which could lead to support for the Kaiser. They are using files obtained from the G810 ROM(s).

Also, some users have upgraded to the driver present in the Samsung Omnia. This driver also uses software rendering, but it has been properly optimized for the ARM architecture.

== Versions ==
Besides the branding differences, there are several models of the HTC TyTN II: the KAIS100, the KAIS110, the KAIS120, and the KAIS130. The KAIS110 has no camera; the KAIS100 has a 3.1 megapixel rear-facing camera; the KAIS120 and KAIS130 have a 3.1-megapixel rear-facing camera and a 0.3-megapixel front-facing camera.

The TyTN II model was sold as:

- KAIS100
  - AT&T Tilt/AT&T 8925/AT&T 8925a(United States)
- KAIS110
  - AT&T Tilt/AT&T 8900/AT&T 8900a (United States)
- KAIS120
  - Emobile Emonster S11HT (Japan)
  - HTC TyTN II P4550
  - O2 XDA Stellar (United Kingdom)
  - T-Mobile MDA Vario III (Austria, Croatia, Czech Republic, Germany, Hungary, the Netherlands, Poland, United Kingdom, Montenegro)
  - Vodafone v1615 (Netherlands, United Kingdom)
  - Vodafone VPA Compact V
- KAIS130
  - 3 TyTN II (Ireland, United Kingdom)
  - T-Mobile Austria MDA VArio III (Austria)
  - KPN HTC TyTN II (the Netherlands)
  - Optus HTC TyTN II (Australia)
  - Orange UK HTC TyTN II (United Kingdom)
  - Plus GSM HTC TyTN II (Poland)
  - SFR v1615 (France)
  - Swisscom Mobile Assistant XPA v1615 (Switzerland)

== ROM updates ==
The TyTN II shipped with Windows Mobile 6.

Official updates are available for several versions of the TyTN II, including the AT&T Tilt (WM 6 AKU 0.4.4), the O2 XDA Stellar (WM 6.1), and the Vodafone v1615.

Developers at XDA-Developers have succeeded in porting Google Android and Windows Mobile 6.5 to the TyTN II.

== Specifications ==
- Screen size: 2.8 in 2.88 in (73 mm)
- Screen resolution: 240×320 pixels at 139 ppi, 4:3 aspect ratio
- Screen colors: 65,536 (16-bit)
- Input devices: touchscreen interface, slide-out QWERTY keyboard, and 360 degree three way jog wheel
- Battery: 1350 mAh, user-accessible; up to 7 hours talk, 365 hours standby
- Cameras: 3.1 megapixel rear-facing with autofocus, 0.3-megapixel front-facing for video calling
- Location finding by detection of cell towers and Wi-Fi networks and with Assisted GPS (through Google Maps Mobile)
- Qualcomm MSM7200 (400 MHz ARM1136EJ-S processor)
- RAM: 128 MB DRAM
- ROM: 256 MB flash memory
- Removable media: microSDHC, up to 32 GB
- Operating system: Windows Mobile 6.0, can be upgraded to Windows Mobile 6.1
- Quad band GSM / GPRS / EDGE (GSM 850/900/1800/1900)
- Tri-band UMTS/HSDPA/HSUPA (850/1900/2100) The EMobile EMonster S11HT is reported to have a UMTS 1700 band.
- Wi-Fi (802.11b/g)
- Bluetooth 2.0 + EDR
- Mini USB (HTC ExtUSB)
- GPS built-in receiver for navigating; built in antenna and MS-147 connector for external connector
- Size: 59 mm (2.3 in) H, 112 mm (4.4 in) W, 19 mm (0.75 in) D
- Weight: 190 g (6.7 oz)

== Preloaded software ==
(Varies by operator)

- AOL Instant Messenger
- BlackBerry Connect
- Brain Challenge
- Bubble Breaker
- Business Card Scanner
- CoPilot Live 7 Sat Nav (Not with O2 UK)
- Excel Mobile
- HTC Home
- Midnight Pool
- Outlook Mobile
- PowerPoint Mobile
- MobiTV
- Ms. Pac-Man
- MyCast
- Solitaire
- Sprite Backup
- TeleNav GPS Navigator
- TeleNav Track
- Tiger Woods PGA Tour 07
- TomTom Navigator 6 Taster Edition
- Windows Live Messenger
- Word Mobile
- Xpress Mail
- Yahoo! Messenger

== GPS compatibility ==
Users of this phone have successfully installed and used other GPS map software applications (such as ALK Technologies CoPilot Live 7, DeLorme Street Atlas USA 2009, Fugawi, Garmin Mobile XT, Google Maps Mobile, iNav iGuidance, Intrisync Destinator, Microsoft Live Search Mobile, TomTom, Tracky, and VisualGPS BeeLineGPS), which are either free or cost nothing beyond the original purchase price. The map applications are compatible with the built-in GPS receiver, provided users set the appropriate COM port for the map application (COM4, 4800 baud).

The built-in GPS receiver was intended by some wireless providers to be used preferably with Telenav, which is a service that charges users monthly fees or fees based on the amount of downloaded map data. Telenav can only provide map data in areas where applicable cellular phone services are available and that users must have a data plan with their wireless providers.

== See also ==
- HTC Wizard
- HTC TyTN

== Discussion forums ==
- 4WinMobile HTC TyTN II Forum
- HowardForums HTC Forum
- HowardForums Windows Mobile Professional Forum
- HTCGeeks HTC TyTN II Forum
- PDA Phone Home HTC TyTN II Forum
- PPCGeeks HTC TyTN II Forum
- XDA-Developers HTC TyTN II Forums
