= S330 =

S330 may refer to:

- Sendo S330, a Sendo mobile phone.
- Canon S330, a Canon Digital IXUS camera model.
- Canon S330, a Canon S-series inkjet printer.
