= SPV =

SPV can refer to the following:

- Sardar Patel Vidyalaya, a school in Delhi, India
- Service for Poland's Victory, a Polish WWII resistance organization
- Budd SPV-2000, rail car
- Orange SPV, 2002 smartphone
- Irish Section 110 Special Purpose Vehicle, a type of company in Ireland that pays no tax
- Special purpose vehicle, a type of legal entity usually created to isolate risk
- Spectrum Pursuit Vehicle, a fictional vehicle
- SPV GmbH, a German record label
- Surface photovoltage, of a semiconductor
- Simple payment verification of a Bitcoin transaction
- Superstrada Pedemontana Veneta, a motorway in Veneto, Italy
- Shope papilloma virus, a virus that infects rabbits and hares and causes keratinous growths resembling horns
