= Sendo =

British mobile phone manufacturer

- Type: Public
- Founded: 1998
- Founder: Hugh Brogan
- Defunct: 29 June 2005
- Headquarters: Birmingham, England
- Key people: Hugh Brogan (CEO), Justin Small (UX Design Lead), Robert Pocknell (Group General Counsel)
- Number of employees: 300

Sendo was a British manufacturer and supplier of mobile phones founded in 1998 and based in Birmingham. It specialised in low-cost handsets aimed primarily at the pay-as-you-go markets and also high-end Symbian smartphones.

The company went into administration in 2005 and its technology was bought by Motorola.

== History ==
Sendo was created in 1998 by mobile phone experts from Philips and Motorola. In February 2001, Microsoft announced a partnership, in which Microsoft bought $12m of Sendo shares (10%) and a seat on the board. Sendo was to be Microsoft's "go to market partner" for the Stinger smartphone platform that became Smartphone 2002.

Microsoft was to deliver code for the StingerOS by June and the first prototype, the Sendo Z100, was delivered. Sendo manage to ship an SDK, but by December not enough code had been delivered by Microsoft and, without any products to sell, Sendo couldn't raise any money from sales or venture capitalists. Sendo dropped Microsoft and opted to go with Symbian but eventually went bankrupt.

Under the deal, if Sendo was declared insolvent "Microsoft would obtain an irrevocable, royalty free licence to use Sendo's Z100 intellectual property, including rights to make, use, or copy the Sendo Smartphone to create other Smartphones and to, most importantly for Microsoft, sublicense those rights to third parties." A product based on the Sendo Z100 was released while Sendo was still solvent by Orange as the Orange SPV 100, manufactured by HTC as the HTC Canary, the first Windows Mobile smartphone.

As a consequence Sendo sued Microsoft in December 2002, alleging it stole proprietary technology and trade secrets and gave these to HTC enabling HTC and itself to launch into the mobile phone market.

Microsoft denied the allegations and in February 2003 filed a counter suit alleging breach of contract. A trial was scheduled for early 2005 but an out of court settlement was reached in September 2004, in which there was a "monetary component" and Microsoft giving up its stake of Sendo. In June 2006 Sendo then sued Orange.

In September 2003, Microsoft and Sendo dropped their suits and announced that Microsoft had given up its shares in Sendo.

In 2004, Sendo sold 5 million devices and, along with other major mobile phone manufacturer, showed interest in using Nvidia's GoForce graphic chips.

In March 2005, Sendo made an objection to the European Commission regarding Ericsson and its patent and licence management after being sued.

Sendo went into administration in June 2005 and its technology was bought by Motorola. At the time Motorola took over the developers and their patents, they held 50 valid patents and had 40 waiting for approval.

== Models ==
- Sendo D800
  - WOXTER D800 (Hong Kong)
- Sendo A820
  - WOXTER S100/S100i (Hong Kong)
- Sendo J520
  - WOXTER B110/B110i (Hong Kong)
- Sendo K1
  - WOXTER K1 (Hong Kong)
- Sendo M550
  - Sendo M551 (North America)
  - Tevion MD 7300 (Germany)
  - WOXTER G300 (Hong Kong)
- Sendo M570
  - WOXTER G350 (Hong Kong)
- Sendo P600
  - WOXTER P600 (Hong Kong)
- Sendo S1
  - WOXTER S1/S1M (Hong Kong)
- Sendo S200
  - WOXTER V400/V400i (Hong Kong)
- Sendo S251
  - WOXTER F600 (Hong Kong)
- Sendo S300
  - WOXTER T100 (Hong Kong)
  - Venko Talento (Brazil)
- Sendo S330
  - WOXTER T160 (Hong Kong)
- Sendo S360
  - WOXTER S360 (Hong Kong)
- Sendo S600
  - WOXTER S600 (Hong Kong)
- Sendo SV663
  - Sendo S633
  - WOXTER S670 (Hong Kong)
- Sendo X
  - WOXTER F200 (Hong Kong)
- Sendo X2 (canceled)
  - WOXTER F250 (Hong Kong)
- Sendo Z100 (canceled)
  - WOXTER Z100 (Hong Kong)
