= Sendo X2 =

Mobile phone developed by Sendo

- Manufacturer: Sendo
- Type: Smartphone
- First released: canceled
- Predecessor: Sendo X
- Operating system: S60
- Memory: 32MB
- Removable storage: miniSD (up to 1GB)
- Rear camera: 1.3 megapixel

The Sendo X2 (codenamed Tobi while in development) was the second Series 60 mobile phone developed by Sendo. When announced, it was the smallest and lightest Series 60 mobile in the marketplace. The Sendo X2 was the first "music mobile" announced; a good six months before Sony Ericsson announced the W800 Walkman phone.

Although the phone was announced and shown at the 3GSM World Congress in Cannes in February 2005, the X2 never made it into production, because Sendo went into administration a matter of weeks before the X2 was due to be released. This led to a few UK based mobile phone magazines publishing reviews of the phone before they knew Sendo was no more.
