= HTC Typhoon =

Windows Mobile smartphone

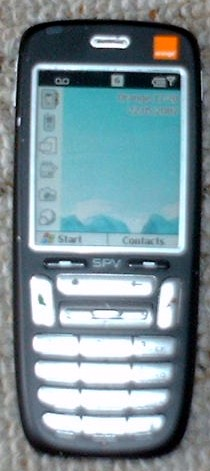
- Manufacturer: HTC
- Availability by region: August 2004; 21 years ago
- Compatible networks: Tri band GSM
- Form factor: Bar
- Dimensions: 108×46×18 mm (4.25×1.81×0.71 in)
- Weight: 107 g
- Operating system: Windows Mobile 2003 SE
- CPU: TI OMAP730 200 MHz
- Memory: 32 MB RAM
- Storage: 64 MB flash ROM
- Removable storage: miniSD card
- Battery: 1050 mAh Li-ion
- Rear camera: 0.3 (VGA) megapixel
- Display: 176 x 220 px 2.2 in 65,536 (16 bits) color LCD
- Connectivity: USB, Bluetooth 1.2, Infrared, and 2.5 mm headset jack
- Data inputs: Keypad
- Other: Similar to the HTC Feeler and Amadeus platform

The HTC Typhoon is a smartphone that runs the Microsoft Windows Mobile operating system. The phone is manufactured by Taiwanese HTC Corporation (HTC). At the time when the Typhoon was made, HTC was not in the business of selling devices to end-users. Instead, the company had many partners who would rebrand and distribute its devices.

It is based on the ARM Texas Instruments OMAP 730 processor running at 200 MHz. It has 32 MB internal RAM and 64 MB of flash ROM, and is expandable via a miniSD slot. It has a TFT display with 65,536 colours at a resolution of 176x220.

It runs Microsoft Windows Mobile 2003 SE as its operating system, however it is also capable of running Windows Mobile 5.0 after a version was leaked onto the internet. It supports Java applications. Additionally, hacked, or "cooked" versions of Windows Mobile 6, 6.1 and 6.5 have circulated on the internet.

== Versions ==
"Typhoon" is the HTC codename for this device, and the device has been rebranded by several distributors and cell phone carriers, under the following names:

- Audiovox SMT5600
- Dopod 565
- i-mate SP3
- Krome Intellekt iQ700
- Orange SPV C500
- Qtek 8010
- Vitelcom/Movistar TSM520
- O2 Xphone IIm
