= Sendo M550 =

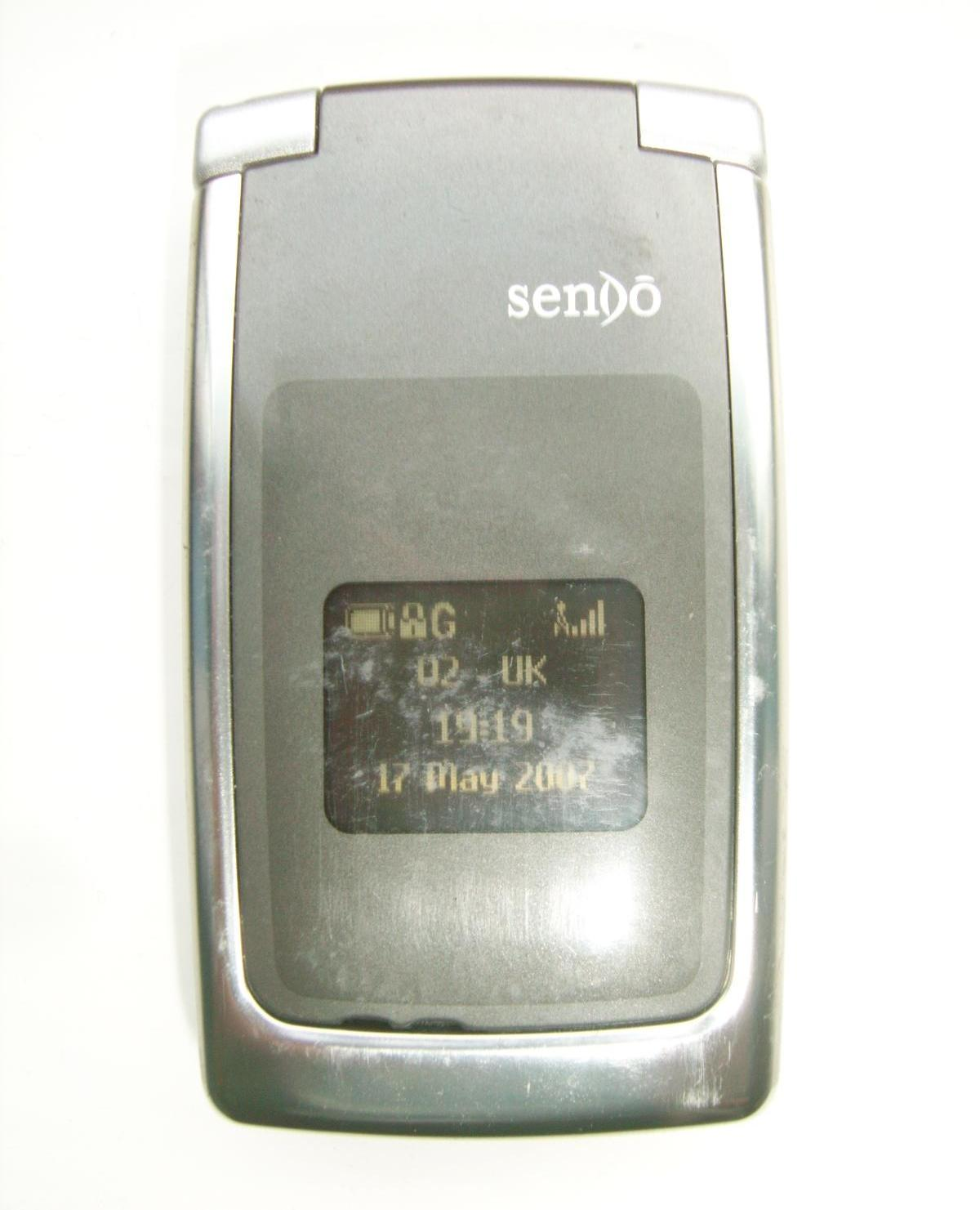
- Manufacturer: Sendo
- Successor: Sendo M570
- Compatible networks: GSM, GPRS class 8
- Form factor: Clamshell
- Dimensions: 82 mm (3.2 in) H 46 mm (1.8 in) W 20 mm (0.79 in) D
- Weight: 75 g (2.6 oz)
- Battery: 400h Stand-by; 1:53h Talk time
- Display: Colour 4.096 colors; 27 mm (1.1 in) H 31 mm (1.2 in) W
- External display: Monochrome
- Connectivity: WAP 1.2.1

The M550 (sold as the M551 in North America) was a phone produced by the now defunct Sendo. It is a compact color mobile phone which features a smaller monochrome screen on the front. It features WAP support with color pictures and three games: Splat 2, TenPin and KombatKlub. It comes in a flip flop design and is available in a variety of front colors including blue, black, red and grey. The screen at the front is used for displaying the time and network info.

It was sold in Germany at the discounter Aldi under the name Tevion MD 7300 and in Hong Kong under the name WOXTER G300 in May 2006.
