= Sendo Z100 =

Phone by Sendo

- The Z100 in a hand with the startscreen.
- Manufacturer: Sendo
- Type: Smartphone
- First released: canceled
- Compatible networks: GSM 900; GSM 1800; GSM 1900
- Dimensions: 126 mm (5.0 in) H 48 mm (1.9 in) W 17 mm (0.67 in) D
- Weight: 99 g (3.5 oz)
- Operating system: Smartphone 2002 (initial StingerOS)
- CPU: Texas Instruments OMAP 710 CPU
- Memory: 16MB
- Storage: 16MB
- Removable storage: MMC, SD card
- Battery: Lithium-ion with 100h Stand-by and 4h Talk time
- Display: TFT, 65K colors, with 176 x 220 pixels (2.2 inches, 35 x 44 mm)
- Connectivity: USB, RS-232, IrDA
- Other: SyncML

Sendo Z100 is a Tri-band phone by Sendo, designed in 2002 and never launched as Sendo sued Microsoft.

== Background ==
After Microsoft bought shares of Sendo, they started together to develop the new devices operating system called Stinger.

Microsoft and Sendo showed a first prototype at the 3GSM World Congress in Cannes in February 2001. The Sendo Z100 was the first prototype implementation of the renamed operating system Smartphone 2002 presented at the CeBIT 2002.

Because the phone was multiple times announced and shunted to new release dates, Sendo canceled the phone in November 2002. Although Sendo didn't give an official reason for cancelling the launch of the Z100, the company had been promised an exclusive by Microsoft, however, Microsoft had also approached HTC to make a competing device which was launched by Orange in the UK as the Orange SPV in November 2002. This later led to a lawsuit between Sendo and Microsoft which ended with an out of court settlement that required all Z100s manufactured to date be destroyed. Sendo announced that the Series 60 platform would be used for future phones.

== Other technical specifications ==
- Speakerphone: Yes
- Memory phonebook
- Call recording
- DATA GPRS: Yes
- Bluetooth: No
- Messaging: SMS
- Browser: Pocket Internet Explorer
- Organizer
- Video streaming: Yes
- Clock: No
- Alarm: Yes
- Games: Yes
- Java: Yes
- Voice dial and memo
