= System Center Mobile Device Manager =

- Developer: Microsoft
- Stable release: 1.0 / April 2008
- Operating system: Windows, Windows Mobile
- License: Proprietary
- Website: www.microsoft.com

System Center Mobile Device Manager is a Mobile device management (MDM) solution providing over-the-air (OTA) management of Windows Mobile Smartphone security, applications and settings. System Center Mobile Device Manager supports devices running the Windows Mobile 6.1 and above operating system. Earlier, functions of this product were provided by System Center Configuration Manager.

Important: Mainstream support for System Center Mobile Device Manager 2008 ended on July 9, 2013, and extended support ended on July 10, 2018.

== Features ==
Through ActiveDirectory-based policies, the product provides the following functions:

- Provisioning of device settings: provisioning the managed devices with settings, such as E-mail accounts, access points, and client certificates.
- Settings monitoring: setting and verifying the settings of managed devices, gathering diagnostics information, and application inventory.
- Device security: back up, restore, lock, wipe, and set up functionality restrictions for managed devices.
- Asset and application management: install/remove, update, gather inventory, version check, and the starting or stopping of mobile applications, such as virus protection, encryption, and mobile email clients.

== Client ==
System Center Mobile Device Manager client is located in ROM. All device management activities are centrally managed from the server side.

== Server ==
System Center Mobile Device Manager server components are deployed on multiple server computers, including a Mobile VPN server, a Windows Update server, and an ActiveDirectory domain controller.
