= HTC Atlas =

Smartphone manufactured by HTC

The HTC Atlas (also known as the HTC P4351) is an Internet-enabled Windows Mobile Pocket PC smartphone designed by HTC of Taiwan. It has a touchscreen with a right-side slide-out QWERTY keyboard. The Atlas's functions include those of a camera phone and a portable media player in addition to text messaging and multimedia messaging. It also offers Internet services including e-mail, instant messaging, web browsing, and local Wi-Fi connectivity. It is a quad-band GSM phone with GPRS and EDGE. It is the successor to the HTC Herald (also known as the HTC P4350).
