= Scout (travel website) =

Travel website, search engine

- Developer: TeleNav
- Release: September 2009
- Platform: Web application
- Available in: English
- Type: Travel
- Website: www.scoutgps.com

Scout, formerly Goby, is a travel website which launched in September 2009. The site searches selected databases and other sources of information on the web, focused on 400 categories of things to do while traveling. Signed-in users may also share their results utilizing the Facebook connect applications programming interface. The website services are free to users and the website is supported by an advertising business model and partner distribution model.
