= .NET Compact Framework controls =

- Developer: Microsoft
- Initial release: 2002; 24 years ago
- Stable release: 3.5.9198.0 / July 20, 2009; 16 years ago
- Website: msdn.microsoft.com/en-us/netframework/aa497273

NET Compact Framework controls is a set of controls for .NET Compact Framework.

== Overview ==
The Microsoft .NET Compact Framework is a sub-library of .NET Framework to simplify the mobile application development of smart devices. Target devices are those limited by the screen size, CPU performance or memory capacity. .NET Compact Framework takes some of the controls and libraries from .NET Framework. Moreover, it optimizes them to match the limited options of resource-constrained mobile devices in comparison to the PCs that the .NET Framework was designed for.

== Features ==
- faster UI development
- widely used controls
- source code availability
- possibility to develop applications in Microsoft Visual Studio

== .NET Compact Framework controls description ==
Controls and Components	Description
Button	Button that responds to the user's tap.
CheckBox	Checkbox option.
ComboBox	Drop-down list from which users can select a value.
ContextMenu	Pop-up menus displayed when touching the object or item
Control	Base for custom controls creation.
DataGrid	Display data from DataSet, DataView or DataTable.
DateTimePicker	Pick date and time.
DocumentList	Displays and manages documents.
DomainUpDown	Definition of the list of controls that the control displays.
HardwareButton	Controls for hardware buttons of pocket device.
Help	Help function.
HScrollBar	Horizontal scroll bar.
ImageList	Holds and provides images to the ListView, TreeView and ToolBar controls.
InputPanel	Controls Soft Input Panel.
LinkLabel	Simple hyperlink functionality.
Label	Displays text.
ListBox and ListControl	Lists of items from which users can select a value.
ListView	Displays a grid.
LogFont	Defines a logical font.
MainMenu	Adds menu to a form.
MessageBox	One or two buttons message boxes.
MessageWindow	Generate and receive Windows messages.
Notification	Displays and responds to user notifications.
MobileDevice	Releases cached resources.
NumericUpDown	Numeric input. Combination of a text box and a vertical scroll bar.
OpenFileDialog	Provides access to a standard open file dialog box.
PictureBox	Displays images.
ProgressBar	Visual indicator of a progress of a task.
RadioButton	Graphical button and a text descriptor.
SaveFileDialog	Opens a save file dialog.
ScreenOrientation	Allows you to change the screen orientation value to 90, 180, or 270.
StatusBar	Adds a status bar to a form.
TabControl	Tabbed interface for an application.
TextBox	Basic text input field.
Timer	Simple timer functionality.
TrackBar	Used to obtain a numeric input.
TreeView	Displays tree control.
VScrollBar	Implementation of a vertical scroll bar.
Panel	Implementation of a Panel container control.

== Third-party .NET Compact Framework controls ==
Apart from Microsoft, other companies exist who produce .NET Compact Framework controls. See External links section below to find out more third-party .NET Compact Framework controls.
