= .NET Compact Framework =

Version of the .NET Framework

.NET Compact Framework (.NET CF)
- Original author: Microsoft
- Developer: Microsoft
- Initial release: 2002; 24 years ago
- Stable release: 3.9.15155.0 / June 2013; 12 years ago
- Operating system: Windows CE 4.1, Pocket PC, Pocket PC 2002, Windows Mobile 2003, Windows Mobile 5.0, Windows Mobile 6.0, Windows Mobile 6.1, Windows Mobile 6.5 and Symbian^3
- Type: Software framework
- License: Proprietary commercial software
- Website: msdn.microsoft.com/en-us/library/f44bbwa1.aspx

The Microsoft .NET Compact Framework (.NET CF) is a version of the .NET Framework originally designed to run on resource constrained mobile/embedded devices such as personal digital assistants (PDAs), mobile phones, factory controllers, set-top boxes, etc. The .NET Compact Framework uses some of the same class libraries as the full .NET Framework and also a few libraries designed specifically for mobile devices such as .NET Compact Framework controls. However, the libraries are not exact copies of the .NET Framework; they are scaled down to use less space.

== Development ==
It is possible to develop applications that use the .NET Compact Framework in Visual Studio .NET 2003, in Visual Studio 2005 and in Visual Studio 2008, in C# or Visual Basic .NET. Applications developed with Basic4ppc are also eventually compiled for the .NET CF. The resulting applications are designed to run on a special, mobile-device, high performance JIT compiler.

The Microsoft .NET Compact Framework 3.5 Redistributable contains the common language runtime and class libraries built for the .NET Compact Framework. In addition to version 3.5 support, it also supports applications developed for version 1.0 and 2.0. The .NET Compact Framework 3.5 provides new features such as Windows Communication Foundation, LINQ, SoundPlayer, new runtime tool support, and many other features.

The UI development is based on Windows Forms which is also available on the desktop version of the .NET Framework. User interfaces can easily be created with Visual Studio by placing .NET Compact Framework controls like buttons, text boxes, etc. on the forms. Also features like data binding are available for the .NET CF. A major disadvantage of the UI development is that modern looking applications with support for finger-based touch screen interaction are not that easy to implement. This is mainly due to the desktop-oriented user interface concept on which Windows Forms is based, although some third party libraries with custom controls for this purpose are available.

== Deployment ==
To be able to run applications powered by the .NET Compact Framework, the platform must support the Microsoft .NET Compact Framework runtime. Some operating systems which do include .NET CF are Windows CE 4.1, Microsoft Pocket PC, Microsoft Pocket PC 2002, Smartphone 2003, and Symbian v3. .NET Compact Framework applications can be run on desktop computers with the full .NET Framework as long as they only access the shared parts of both frameworks, though their user interface cannot be upgraded to look like that of an application developed for desktop PCs.

A version of the .NET Compact Framework is also available for the Xbox 360 console. While it features the same runtime as the regular .NET CF, only a subset of the class library is available. This version is used by XNA Framework to run managed games on the console. There are other limitations as well, such as the number of threads being limited to 256. Unlike other versions of .NET CF, the Xbox 360 version allows setting processor affinity to threads created. The threads are scheduled among four concurrent threads running on the multiple processor cores of the system.

== Release history ==
Version name	Version number	Release date
1.0 RTM	1.0.2268.0	2002 late
1.0 SP1	1.0.3111.0	2003
1.0 SP2	1.0.3316.0	unknown
1.0 SP3	1.0.4292.0	2005 January
2.0 RTM	2.0.5238.0	2005 October
2.0 SP1	2.0.6129.0	2006 June
2.0 SP2	2.0.7045.0	2007 March
3.5 Beta 1	3.5.7066.0	2007 May
3.5 Beta 2	3.5.7121.0	unknown
3.5 RTM	3.5.7283.0	2007 November 19
3.5	3.5.7283.0	2008 January 25
3.5	3.5.9040.0	2009 February 8
3.5	3.5.9198.0	2009 July 20
3.5	3.5.10181.0	2010 June 29 (with WinCE QFE, June 2010)
3.5	3.5.11125.0	2011 June 15 (with WinCE QFE, May 2011)
3.7	3.7.0.0	8 June 2009 18:38
3.7	3.7.8345.0	2009
3.9	3.9.15155.0	June 2013

== See also ==
- .NET Compact Framework controls
- .NET Framework
- .NET Micro Framework
- Windows CE
- Windows Mobile
