= Adaptation kit upgrade =

An Adaptation kit upgrade (AKU or Adaptation kit update) updates Microsoft's Windows Mobile operating systems for devices (excluding Windows 10 Mobile).

It is a collection of updates, fixes and enhancements to the tools delivered to hardware device manufacturers to create or update devices based on a specific platform.

This term is used by Microsoft to designate the current update version for a particular embedded platform such as Windows Mobile which is used for personal digital assistants and smartphone devices. On the Windows Mobile platform the AKU is to Windows Mobile what a service pack is to Microsoft Windows.

Microsoft releases AKUs to allow device manufacturers with updates to create new products or fix issues with older products. These enhancements are usually not available to the consumer or end user unless released as a firmware update from the vendor.

== AKU Versions for Windows Mobile 5 ==
=== AKU 1.0 ===
- landscape screen mode support
- start devices without a SIM card
- checking for incoming mail at defined intervals
- full-fledged SIM contacts support
- added fixed dialing numbers
- added alarm clock indicator to today screen
- added ability to send SMS while viewing call history

=== AKU 1.1 ===
- Improves support for many Bluetooth profiles, such as stereo headset (A2DP)
- Wi-Fi connectivity now displays more status information. Wi-Fi performance improved.
- official hard drive support
- increased screen rotation speed

=== AKU 2.0 ===
- Messaging and Security Feature Pack (MSFP), including DirectPush email functionality and GZIP compression
- Internet Explorer Mobile adds accelerated scrolling, Fast Back feature, support for compiled WML, WMLScript over HTTP, enhanced DOM standard and frames
- added SMIME support for messaging
- added wireless manager to turn wireless features on and off
- replaced clock with battery status indicator in the upper right corner

=== AKU 2.1 ===
- dynamic switching between screen modes (landscape and portrait).

=== AKU 2.2 ===
- ActiveSync improvements.
- boot speed improvements.
- allows user to choose clock or battery status indicator in the upper right corner
- added support for PPP over USB

=== AKU 2.3 ===
- bug fixes.

=== AKU 2.5 ===
- bug fixes.
- SmartDial from the Today screen
- added ability to change dialing font color
- (up to 2x) for video clips played back in Windows Media Player.

=== AKU 3.0 ===
- language provisioning (enabling local manufacturers to add as many languages to a device as its onboard memory can store)
- WiFi connection wizard (new Internet Sharing utility replaces Modem Link).
- WPA2 support for WiFi
- Quick start wizard
- support for 2nd display (for instance on phones with two displays)
- better SMS handling
- Bluetooth profile "Personal Area Network" (PAN) is added, and "Dial-Up Networking" (DUN) profile is removed.
- vCard contacts can be transferred via SMS.
- SIM card contacts are sorted by Name in general contacts list.
- IE now supports AJAX
- added .Net Compact Framework 2.0
- added ability to save SMS to SIM card
- added support for SMS over GPRS

=== AKU 3.2 ===
- updated Bluetooth stack that opens up even more tethered connectivity options

== AKU Versions for Windows Mobile 6 ==
=== AKU 1.5.1 ===
- Included in the Samsung Omnia SCH-i910 (for Verizon Wireless) CF03 software upgrade
- Included in the Samsung Saga SCH-i770 (for Verizon Wireless) CE07 software upgrade

=== AKU 1.4.6 ===
- One example:

=== AKU 0.2 ===
- IE Mobile upgraded to 6.12

=== AKU 0.4.4 ===
- One example is listed in the ATT Tilt rom upgrade:

== AKU Versions for Windows Mobile 6.5 ==
=== AKU 5.3.11 ===
Latest and the last update for Windows Mobile from Microsoft. Released in December 2010. AKU Build 23148

=== AKU 5.3.10 ===
AKU Build 23145

=== AKU 5.0.60 ===
AKU Build 21840

== AKU Versions for Windows Embedded Handheld ==
Windows Mobile is succeeded by Windows Phone in consumer electronics segment and Windows Embedded Handheld for industrial electronics. Windows Embedded Handheld starts with AKU 5.3.12. Windows Embedded Handheld is meant to carry on the Windows Mobile for rugged handhelds and is only a change in AKU over Windows Mobile 6.5. Unlike Windows Phone, WEH is compatible with WM 6.5.

=== AKU 5.3.12.7 ===
AKU Build 29049

=== AKU 5.3.12.4 ===
AKU Build 29036

=== AKU 5.3.12 ===
AKU Build 29023

== See also ==
- Windows Mobile
