= TeleNav =

Location services company

Telenav, Inc
- Type: Private company (1999-2010, since 2021); Public company Nasdaq: TNAV (2010-2021)
- Industry: Location-based service
- Founded: 1999 by H.P. Jin, Sal Dhanani, Y.C. Chao and Bob Rennard
- Headquarters: Santa Clara, California
- Number of employees: 583
- Website: www.telenav.com

Telenav, Inc. is a Wireless location-based services corporation that provides services including Global Positioning System (GPS) satellite navigation, local search, automotive navigation solutions, mobile advertising, enterprise mobility and workflow automation. The company’s headquarters are located in Santa Clara, California in the United States with additional offices in the U.S., Germany, Japan, Romania, China, and Brazil.

== History ==
=== Founding ===
Telenav, founded as “Televigation” was first established in 1999 by HP Jin, YC Chao, Sal Dhanani and Robert Rennard to provide GPS-based navigation software on mobile devices.

=== 1999-2004 ===
In December 2000, Telenav launched myPNA (My Personal Navigation Assistant) WAP service to Sprint. The product allowed users to retrieve directions between two addresses and search for local points-of-interest (POIs).

In 2002, Telenav developed a real-time mobile navigation product for Nextel/Motorola Java phones using a tethered GPS receiver developed by GlobalSat. The following year, Navigator was created for the BlackBerry 7520, RIM’s first GPS-enabled device.

=== 2005-2009 ===
Sprint Navigation was introduced in 2005. Catering to Sprint devices, Telenav created a line of mobile-based applications with 3D navigation capability available for wireless subscribers using particular Sprint devices.

Telenav Track, a product designed to help companies track their mobile resources including employees, vehicles and assets was launched in 2006.

In 2009, Telenav announced their first Android app available in Google Play and BlackBerry App world.

Also, in June 2009, Telenav unveiled its first app for iOS, AT&T Navigator, made available on the iPhone 3G and iPhone 3GS.

In March 2011, Telenav announced a stand-alone application, Telenav GPS Navigation, available for all iOS users.

=== 2010-present ===
Telenav completed its initial public offering (IPO) in May 13, 2010 and began trading on the NASDAQ under the ticker symbol TNAV. With the completion of its IPO, Telenav became the first mobile LBS company to enter into public trading.

In 2010, Ford announced it had also selected Telenav to provide GPS navigation software in its new MyFord Touch driver connect technology. During the summer, Telenav announced a partnership with U.S. Cellular Corporation (U.S.C.C.) to bring mobile GPS navigation service to wireless subscribers.

In September 2011, Telenav acquired the Boston-based company, Goby Inc., a local and travel search company.

In March 27, 2012, Telenav announced Scout for Apps, in March – a service for mobile web and app developers to include turn-by-turn, voice-guided GPS navigation within their mobile app or website via HTML5.

At CES 2012, Telenav announced new iPhone app, Scout, a GPS and discovery app with integration with the web and automotive. Also at CES, Ford announced Scout as the navigation service for some vehicles.

In January 2014 Telenav acquired Skobbler, a producer of navigation software for Android and iPhone based on OpenStreetMap for $23.8 Million.

In February 2021 the company was taken private and its shares de-listed from NASDAQ.

== Products ==
=== Scout ===
Announced in January, 2012, Scout was launched for iPhones. The free mobile app features mapping and navigation support, and allows users to access real-time commute times, current location, search and weather.

=== Scout.me ===
Also announced in January 2012, It is an online searching tool for food, drink and social activities around a user's location.

=== Thinknear ===
In 2012 Telenav announced it was paying $22.5 million to acquire ThinkNear, a hyperlocal mobile ad startup that helps target consumers with very precise and contextual location-based ads. In August 2019, Telenav sold Thinknear to inMarket.

=== Scout for Apps ===
Scout for Apps is a HTML5, browser-based, voice-guided turn-by-turn GPS navigation service for mobile phones. The free service for mobile web and app developer, offers the ability to include turn-by-turn, voice-guided GPS navigation within their mobile app or website. Developers can integrate the service by adding one line of code.

=== Telenav GPS Navigator ===
Telenav GPS Navigator is a mobile GPS navigation application.

=== Telenav Shotgun ===
Released in 2008, Telenav Shotgun is an Internet-connected personal navigation device. In addition to 3D turn-by-turn navigation and voice assistance, Shotgun features include real-time traffic, mileage tracking, local search of POIs, and automatic re-routing.

=== OnMyWay ===
OnMyWay is an application to help drivers provide updates on their arrival time to a destination. It is available on BlackBerry iPhone & Android devices.

=== Telenav Track ===
TeleNav Track is an enterprise mobility software that is designed to help organizations manage their mobile workforce and assets.

=== TeleNav Asset Tracker ===
TeleNav Asset Tracker is a product which is designed to let users to monitor the real-time location of assets, such as packages, cargo or equipment, using a secure, web-based portal.

=== TeleNav Vehicle Tracker ===
TeleNav Vehicle Tracker is designed to help companies track their fleet vehicles in real-time using a web-based portal.

=== Sipity ===
Is a networking application designed to make finding and connecting with relevant people at events easier. Currently available on the iPhone, users can seek other potential contacts at tradeshows or other industry events with similar positions or interests

=== Jungle! ===
Designed for university students, Jungle! is a mobile marketplace application which allows users to buy, sell, and find items, services, and housing within their surrounding areas from their iPhone or iPod Touch.

=== MyTies ===
In November 2010, TeleNav launched its mobile application named MyTies. MyTies is a mobile-based social network.
