= Microsoft Azure Dev Tools for Teaching =

Developer tools for cloud computing education

Azure Dev Tools for Teaching
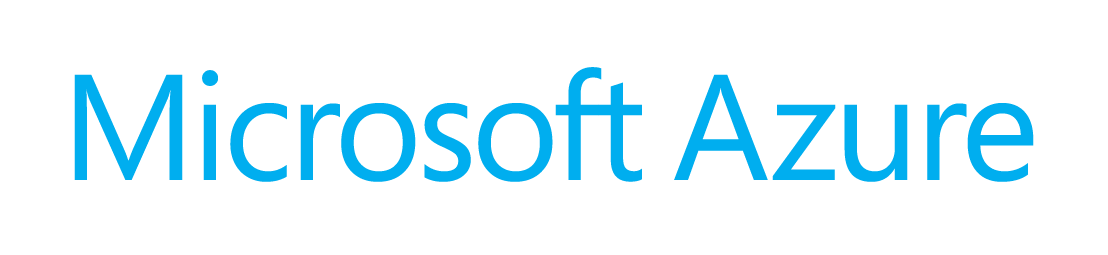
- Developer: Microsoft
- Platform: Azure
- Website: azureforeducation.microsoft.com

Microsoft Azure Dev Tools for Teaching or simply Azure Dev Tools for Teaching is a Microsoft program to provide students with Microsoft software design, Microsoft developer tools, Cloud Computing Access and learning resources. The program is available for university/college and K-12 students Azure for Student and Azure Dev Tools for teaching are available in more than 140 countries.

It has formerly been known as Microsoft Imagine, DreamSpark and MSDN-AA.

Azure Dev Tools for Teaching (previously known as Microsoft Imagine Standard and Premium) is a subscription-based offering for accredited schools and departments providing access to tools commonly used in science, technology, engineering, and math (STEM) programs. It gives teachers and students tools, software, and services from Microsoft that are used by professional developers and designers.

Many academic institutions provide information and resources for Azure Dev Tools for teaching and Azure for students under their academic IT Services support pages; see the following example from a university from around the world .

1. University of Pittsburgh

2. Queen University

3. University of Sussex

== History ==
All students get access to Cloud resources and Azure credit. student must register at Microsoft Azure for Student and verify their identity through their verified educational institutions. If an institution is not listed on the available list, the user may manually verify their student status by uploading a proof such as an ID card.

The Microsoft student developer tools programme was announced by Bill Gates as DreamSpark on February 20, 2008, during a speech at Stanford University. It is estimated that up to 35 million students will be able to access these software titles through this program. The service was renamed to Microsoft Imagine on September 7, 2016, to better align with the annual Imagine Cup competition hosted by Microsoft. and renamed to Azure Dev Tools for Teaching and Azure for Students in June 2018.

=== Repacked as Azure Dev Tools for Teaching ===
The Microsoft Azure Dev Tools for Teaching on February 13, 2019, with Cloud services for students using the Microsoft Azure cloud and incorporating Microsoft Learn online learning resources.

== Verification ==
Proof of student status is required to download software and obtain product keys. Students can verify their identity using ISIC cards, access codes ordered by school administrators, or .edu academic email addresses. Students remain verified for 12 months afterwards and can renew after the 12-month period using their academic email. If students can't find their school, they can manually submit a response with a proof of student status.

== Products offered ==
Several development software titles are available for download through the program. They include:

=== Products available through Azure Dev Tools for Teaching ===
The following product families are included in the Azure Dev Tools for Teaching subscriptions:

- Advanced Threat Analytics
- Agents for Visual Studio
- Azure DevOps Server
- BizTalk Server
- Host Integration Server
- Hyper-V Server
- Machine Learning Server
- R Server
- Remote Tools for Visual Studio
- SharePoint Server
- Skype for Business Server
- SQL Server Developer
- SQL Server Enterprise
- SQL Server Mobile Report Publisher
- SQL Server Standard
- SQL Server Web
- System Center
- Visual Studio Code
- Visual Studio Community
- Visual Studio Enterprise
- Visual Studio for Mac
- Windows Server

There are three Microsoft Office applications (Excel, PowerPoint, Word) not available through Imagine. However, Office Home & Student 2013 or Office 365 University offers those at a discounted price for students. Unlike the programs listed above, there is no way to access similar older and compatible versions (2010, 2007) of Office for Word, Excel or PowerPoint under Imagine. Also, the only desktop operating system now available for download is Windows 10 Education.

=== Additional benefits ===
- Electronic License Management Systems (ELMS) for software download
- Access to Microsoft training and learning resources
- $100 of credit Azure Cloud Computing resource for a 12-month period renewable as long as student studying at the institution

== See also ==
- Microsoft for Startups
