= Windows Mobile =

Family of mobile operating systems by Microsoft (2000–2013)

- Windows Mobile 6.5 screenshot, showing the Today screen
- Developer: Microsoft
- OS family: Windows CE
- Working state: Discontinued
- Source model: Closed-source
- Released to manufacturing: April 19, 2000; 26 years ago
- Final release: 6.5.3 / February 2, 2010; 16 years ago
- Marketing target: Mobile devices
- Update method: Adaptation kit upgrade
- Kernel type: Monolithic
- Default user interface: Graphical
- License: Proprietary software licensed to OEMs
- Succeeded by: Windows Phone
- Official website: www.microsoft.com/windowsmobile/default.mspx

Support status
- Unsupported

Windows Mobile is a discontinued mobile operating system developed by Microsoft for smartphones and personal digital assistants (PDA). Designed to be the portable equivalent of the Windows desktop OS in the emerging mobile/portable area, the operating system is built on top of Windows CE (later known as Windows Embedded Compact) and was originally released as Pocket PC 2000.

Microsoft introduced the Pocket PC keyboard-less PDAs in 2000, with Pocket PC 2000 being the software. It was based on version 3.0 of Windows CE, the operating system originally developed for the Handheld PC in 1996. The next versions were Pocket PC 2002 and Smartphone 2002, the latter of which would power a new category of keypad-based cell phone devices named Smartphone. With the release of Windows Mobile 2003, the software was rebranded to a single "Windows Mobile" for both Pocket PCs and Smartphones, and to connect the brand with its desktop counterpart. Support for SH-3 and MIPS processor architectures were dropped, focusing only on ARM. In the next major release, Windows Mobile 5.0 in 2005, Microsoft unified the separate developments of Pocket PC and Smartphone software into a single Windows Mobile codebase. Data could be synchronized with desktops using ActiveSync software, and later using Windows Mobile Device Center.

Windows Mobile 6.0 and 6.1 were the next major releases, in 2007 and 2008 respectively, by which time the hardware devices were also solely under the Windows Mobile banner. Along with the final major release, Windows Mobile 6.5, the first to be designed for use without a stylus on touchscreens, Microsoft also introduced the Windows Marketplace for Mobile for software distribution, for Windows Mobile 6.x devices. Following the success of newer mobile operating systems like iOS, Windows Mobile faded rapidly; in 2010, Microsoft announced the more modern and consumer-focused Windows Phone 7 as its replacement, and Windows Mobile has been deprecated since existing devices and software are incompatible with Windows Phone.

== Features ==
Most versions of Windows Mobile have a standard set of features, such as multitasking and the ability to navigate a file system similar to that of Windows 9x and Windows NT, including support for many of the same file types. Similarly to its desktop counterpart, it comes bundled with a set of applications that perform basic tasks. Internet Explorer Mobile is the default web browser, and Windows Media Player is the default media player used for playing digital media. The mobile version of Microsoft Office is the default office suite.

Internet Connection Sharing, supported on compatible devices, allows the phone to share its Internet connection with computers via USB and Bluetooth. Windows Mobile supports virtual private networking over PPTP protocol. Most devices with mobile connectivity also have a Radio Interface Layer. The Radio Interface Layer provides the system interface between the Cell Core layer within the Windows Mobile OS and the radio protocol stack used by the wireless modem hardware. This allows OEMs to integrate a variety of modems into their equipment.

The user interface changed dramatically between versions, only retaining similar functionality. The Today Screen, later called the Home Screen, shows the current date, owner information, upcoming appointments, e-mails, and tasks. The taskbar displays the current time as well as the volume level. Devices with a cellular radio also show the signal strength on said taskbar.

== History ==
An Alpha build of WinPad in the early days of development showing off stylus compatibility

Windows Mobile is based on the Windows CE kernel and first appeared as the Pocket PC 2000 operating system. It includes a suite of basic applications developed with the Microsoft Windows API, and is designed to have features and appearance somewhat similar to desktop versions of Windows. It allowed third-party developers to develop software for Windows Mobile with no restrictions imposed by Microsoft. Software applications were purchasable from Windows Marketplace for Mobile during the service's lifespan.

Most early Windows Mobile devices came with a stylus, which can be used to enter commands by tapping it on the screen. The primary touch input technology behind most devices were resistive touchscreens which often required a stylus for input. Later devices used capacitive sensing which does not require a stylus. Along with touchscreens, a large variety of form factors existed for the platform. Some devices featured slideout keyboards, while others featured minimal face buttons.

=== Windows CE ===
Microsoft's work on handheld portable devices began with research projects in 1990, with the work on Windows CE beginning in 1992. Initially, the OS and the user interface were developed separately. With Windows CE being based on Windows 95 code and a separate team handing the user interface which was codenamed WinPad (later Microsoft At Work for Handhelds). Windows 95 had strong pen support making porting easy; with some saying "At this time, Windows 95 offers outstanding pen support. It is treating pens right for the first time." WinPad was delayed due to price and performance issues, before being scrapped in early 1995 due to touchscreen driver problems relating to WriteTouch technology, made by NCR Microelectronic Products. Although WinPad was never released as a consumer product, Alpha builds were released showcasing many interface elements. During development of WinPad a separate team worked on a project called Pulsar; designed to be a mobile communications version of WinPad, described as a "pager on Steroids". This project was also canceled around the same time as WinPad. The two disbanded groups would form the Pegasus project in 1995. Pegasus would work on the hardware side of the Windows CE OS, attempting to create a form factor similar to a PC-esque PDA like WinPad, with communications functionality like Pulsar. Under the name Handheld PC, a hardware reference guide was created, and devices began shipping in 1996, although most of these devices bore little resemblance to the goal of a pen-based touchscreen handheld device. A specification for a smaller form factor under the name Palm-size PC was released in 1998.

=== Pocket PC 2000 ===
Pocket PC 2000 Today screen

Pocket PC 2000, originally codenamed "Rapier", was released on April 19, 2000, and was based on the Windows CE 3.0 kernel.

Pocket PC 2000 was the debut of what was later to become the Windows Mobile operating system, and was meant to be a successor to the operating system aboard Palm-size PCs. Backwards compatibility was retained with such Palm-size PC applications.

Pocket PC 2000 was intended mainly for Pocket PC devices; however, several Palm-size PC devices had the ability to be updated as well. Furthermore, several Pocket PC 2000 phones were released (under the name Handheld PC 2000), however at this time, Microsoft's "Smartphone" hardware platform had not yet been created. At this time, Pocket PC devices had not been standardized with a specific CPU architecture. As a result, Pocket PC 2000 was released on multiple CPU architectures, such as SH-3, MIPS, and ARM. The only resolution supported by this release was 240 x 320 (QVGA).

Removable storage card formats that were supported were CompactFlash and MultiMediaCard. Infrared (IR) File beaming capability was among the original hardware features.

Aesthetically, the original Pocket PC operating system was similar in design to the then-current Windows 98, Windows 2000, and the yet-to-be-released Windows Me desktop operating systems. Crucially, the Pocket PC had a less cluttered interface more suitable for a mobile device, unlike the interface on predeceasing Palm-size PCs. Mainstream support for Pocket PC 2000 ended on September 30, 2005, and extended support ended on October 9, 2007.

This initial release had multiple built-in applications, many of them similarly branded to match their desktop counterparts; such as Microsoft Reader, Microsoft Money, Pocket Internet Explorer and Windows Media Player. A version of Microsoft Office called Pocket Office was also bundled and included Pocket Word, Pocket Excel and Pocket Outlook. Notes, a note-taking app saw its first release and would be supported by most later versions of Windows Mobile. Intelligent character recognition support allowed Notes to distinguish styles of handwriting to be learned by the OS during processing to improve accuracy and recognition levels.

=== Pocket PC 2002 ===
Pocket PC 2002 Today screen

Pocket PC 2002, originally codenamed "Merlin", was released on October 4, 2001, and was based on the Windows CE 3.0 kernel, like with Pocket PC 2000. Although targeted mainly for 240×320 (QVGA) Pocket PC devices, Pocket PC 2002 was also used for Pocket PC phones (Pocket PC 2002 Phone Edition).

Aesthetically, Pocket PC 2002 was meant to be similar in design to the then newly released Windows XP. Newly added or updated programs include Windows Media Player 8 with streaming capability; MSN Messenger, and Microsoft Reader 2, with Digital rights management support. Upgrades to the bundled version of Office Mobile include a spell checker and word count tool in Pocket Word and improved Pocket Outlook. Connectivity was improved with file beaming on non-Microsoft devices such as Palm OS, the inclusion of Terminal Services and Virtual private networking support, and the ability to synchronize folders. Other upgrades include an enhanced UI with theme support and savable downloads and WAP in Pocket Internet Explorer.

=== Smartphone 2002 ===
Smartphone 2002 Today screen

Smartphone 2002, originally codenamed "Stinger", was released in 2002. Based on Windows CE 3.0 like Pocket PC 2002 and Pocket PC 2000, Smartphone 2002 was built for GSM cell phones with standard keypad-based form factors, as opposed to Pocket PC 2002 Phone Edition which targeted standard touch-based PDAs. The first device that was supposed to ship with Smartphone 2002 was the Sendo Z100 which was canceled after Sendo sued Microsoft.

=== Windows Mobile 2003 ===
Windows Mobile 2003 Today screen

Windows Mobile 2003 Second Edition Today screen

In 2003, Microsoft officially unified the "Windows for Pocket PC" and the "Windows for Smartphone" product lines to the "Windows Mobile" brand. Windows Mobile 2003, initially named as Pocket PC 2003 and originally codenamed "Ozone", was the first release under the Windows Mobile banner, released on June 23, 2003, based on the Windows CE 4.2 kernel.

Communications interface were enhanced with Bluetooth device management, which allowed for Bluetooth file beaming support, Bluetooth headset support and support for Bluetooth add-on keyboards. A pictures application with viewing, cropping, e-mail, and beaming support was added. Multimedia improvements included MIDI file support as ringtones in Phone Edition and Windows Media Player 9.0 with streaming optimization. A puzzle game titled Jawbreaker is among the preinstalled programs. GAPI was included with this release to facilitate the development of games for the platform.

Other features/built-in applications included the following: enhanced Pocket Outlook with vCard and vCal support, improved Pocket Internet Explorer and SMS reply options for Phone Edition.

=== Windows Mobile 2003 SE ===
Windows Mobile 2003 Second Edition, also known as "Windows Mobile 2003 SE", was released on March 24, 2004, and first offered on the Dell Axim x30. It was based on the Windows CE 4.x kernel. This was the last version which allowed users to back up and restore an entire device through ActiveSync.

This upgrade allows users to switch between portrait and landscape modes and introduces a single-column layout in Pocket Internet Explorer. It includes support for Wi-Fi Protected Access (WPA) and new screen resolutions: 640×480 (VGA), 240×240, and 480×480. It was powered by the same OS as with Windows Mobile 2003, which was Windows CE 4.20.

=== Windows Mobile 5 ===
Windows Mobile 5.0 Today screen

Windows Mobile 5.0, originally codenamed "Magneto", was released at Microsoft's Mobile and Embedded Developers Conference 2005 in Las Vegas, May 9–12, 2005, and was based on the Windows CE 5.0 kernel. It requires at least 64 MB of RAM and an ARM compatible processor. Microsoft Office Mobile and Windows Media Player 10 Mobile were pre-installed.

Windows Mobile 5.0 included Microsoft Exchange Server "push" functionality improvements that worked with Exchange 2003 SP2. The OS used the .NET Compact Framework 1.0 SP3, an environment for programs based on .NET. New software features included an enhanced battery-saving capability called persistent storage capability, which was designed to seamlessly move data between RAM and flash memory to avoid data loss. New hardware features included enhanced Bluetooth support, default QWERTY keyboard-support and a management interface for Global Positioning System (GPS).

OS updates were released as adaptation kit upgrades, with AKU 3.5 being the final released. Mainstream support for the OS was offered through October 12, 2010, and extended support through October 13, 2015.

=== Windows Mobile 6 ===
Windows Mobile 6.0 Today screen

Windows Mobile 6, formerly codenamed "Crossbow", was released on February 12, 2007 at the 3GSM World Congress 2007 and was based on the Windows CE 5.2 kernel. Three different versions were released: "Windows Mobile 6 Standard" for smartphones without touchscreens, "Windows Mobile 6 Professional" for Pocket PCs with phone functionality, and "Windows Mobile 6 Classic" for Pocket PCs without cellular radios.

Windows Mobile 6 was strongly linked to the then newly introduced Windows Live and Exchange 2007 products, and was meant to be similar in design to the then newly released Windows Vista. Functionally, it works much like Windows Mobile 5, but with improved stability.

Along with the announcement of Office Mobile 6.1 with support for Office 2007 document formats (pptx, docx, xlsx); OneNote Mobile, a companion to Microsoft Office OneNote was added to the already installed version, and improvements were made to existing applications, such as enabling HTML email support in Outlook Mobile.

=== Windows Mobile 6.1 ===
Windows Mobile 6.1 Today screen

Windows Mobile 6.1 was announced April 1, 2008, and was based on the Windows CE 5.x kernel.

It is a minor upgrade to the Windows Mobile 6 platform with various performance enhancements and a redesigned Home screen featuring horizontal tiles that expand on clicking to display more information, although this new home screen is featured only on Windows Mobile Standard edition. This was not supported in the Professional edition. Several other changes such as threaded SMS, full page zooming in Internet Explorer and 'Domain Enroll' were also added, along with a "mobile" version of the Microsoft OneNote program and an interactive "Getting Started" wizard. Domain Enroll is functionality to connect the device to System Center Mobile Device Manager 2008, a product to manage mobile devices. Windows Mobile 6.1 also had improved bandwidth efficiency in its push-email protocol ActiveSync up to 40%; this considerably improved battery life in many devices.

Aside from the visual and feature distinctions, the underlying CE versions can be used to differentiate WM 6.0 from WM 6.1. The version of Windows CE in WM 6.0 is 5.2.*, where the third and final number being a four-digit build ID (e.g. 5.2.1622 on HTC Wing). In WM 6.1, the CE version is 5.2.* with a five-digit build number (e.g. 5.2.19216 on Palm Treo 800w).

=== Windows Mobile 6.5 ===
Windows Mobile 6.5 Today screen

Windows Mobile 6.5.3 Today screen

Windows Mobile 6.5 is a stopgap update to Windows Mobile 6.1, based on the Windows CE 5.x kernel, intended to bridge the gap between version 6.1 and the then yet-to-be released Windows Phone 7, which arrived in 2010. It was released to manufacturers on May 11, 2009; the first devices running the operating system were released in late October 2009. Several phones that officially shipped with Windows Mobile 6.1 can be officially updated to Windows Mobile 6.5.

This update includes some significant new added features, such as a revamped GUI, a new Today screen resembling that of Microsoft's Zune player with vertically scrollable labels (called 'Titanium') in terms of functionality with a styling similar to that of Windows 7. WM 6.5 also includes the new Internet Explorer Mobile 6 browser, with improved interface. Along with Windows Mobile 6.5, Microsoft announced several cloud computing services codenamed "SkyBox", "SkyLine", "SkyMarket".

In the months following this release, development shifted from Windows Mobile to its successor Windows Phone. As such, no major upgrades were planned or released. However, three minor updates (6.5.1, 6.5.3 and 6.5.5) were made to satisfy consumers during the transition period. The last minor update and the last released version is 6.5.5. It first leaked in January 2010, and was unofficially ported to some Windows Mobile phones.

== Hardware ==
There are three main versions of Windows Mobile for various hardware devices. Windows Mobile Professional, which runs on smartphones with touchscreens; Windows Mobile Standard, which runs on mobile phones without touchscreens; and Windows Mobile Classic, which runs on personal digital assistant or Pocket PCs. Windows Mobile for Automotive and Windows Mobile software for Portable Media Centers are among some specialty versions of the platform.

Microsoft had over 50 handset partners, when Windows Mobile was still being shipped on new devices. 80% of the 50 million Windows Mobile devices that were made from launch to February 2009 were built by one contract manufacturing group, HTC, which makes handsets for several major companies under their brands, and under its own brand.

Naming conventions for each version
	Pocket PC 2000	Pocket PC 2002 / Smartphone 2002	Windows Mobile 2003	Windows Mobile 2003 SE	Windows Mobile 5.0	Windows Mobile 6	Windows Mobile 6.1	Windows Mobile 6.5
Pocket PC (without Mobile Phone)	Pocket PC 2000	Pocket PC 2002	Windows Mobile 2003 for Pocket PC	Windows Mobile 2003 for Pocket PC SE	Windows Mobile 5.0 for Pocket PC	Windows Mobile 6 Classic	Windows Mobile 6.1 Classic	N/A
Pocket PC (with Mobile Phone)	Pocket PC 2000 Phone Edition	Pocket PC 2002 Phone Edition	Windows Mobile 2003 for Pocket PC Phone Edition	Windows Mobile 2003 SE for Pocket PC Phone Edition	Windows Mobile 5.0 for Pocket PC Phone Edition	Windows Mobile 6 Professional	Windows Mobile 6.1 Professional	Windows Mobile 6.5 Professional
Smartphone (without touch screen)	N/A	Smartphone 2002	Windows Mobile 2003 for Smartphone	Windows Mobile 2003 SE for Smartphone	Windows Mobile 5.0 for Smartphone	Windows Mobile 6 Standard	Windows Mobile 6.1 Standard	Windows Mobile 6.5 Standard

=== Embedded Handheld ===
On January 10, 2011, Microsoft announced Windows Embedded Handheld 6.5. The operating system has compatibility with Windows Mobile 6.5 and is presented as an enterprise handheld device, targeting retailers, delivery companies, and other companies that rely on handheld computing. Unlike Windows Phone, Windows Embedded Handheld retains backward compatibility with legacy Windows Mobile applications.

=== Pocket PCs ===
Pocket PCs and personal digital assistants were originally the intended platform for Windows Mobile. These were grouped into two main categories: devices that lacked mobile phone capabilities, and those that included it. Beginning with version 6 devices with this functionality ran "Windows Mobile 6 Professional" and those that lacked it ran "Windows Mobile 6 Classic". Microsoft had described these devices as "a handheld device that enables you to store and retrieve e-mail, contacts, appointments, play multimedia files, games, exchange text messages with MSN Messenger, browse the Web, and more". From a technical standpoint Microsoft also specified various hardware and software requirements such as the inclusion of a touchscreen and a directional pad or touchpad.

=== Smartphones ===
Smartphones were the second hardware platform after Pocket PC to run Windows Mobile, and debuted with the release of Smartphone 2002. Although in the broad sense of the term "Smartphone", both Pocket PC phones and Microsoft branded Smartphones each fit into this category. Microsoft's use of the term "Smartphone" includes only more specific hardware devices that differ from Pocket PC phones. Such Smartphones were originally designed without touchscreens, intended to be operated more efficiently with only one hand, and typically had lower display resolution than Pocket PCs. Microsoft's focus for the Smartphone platform was to create a device that functioned well as a phone and data device in a more integrated manner.

== Market share ==
Windows Mobile market share
Year	U.S. marketshare
2004	11.3%
2005	17%
2006	37%
2007	42%
2008	27%
2009	15%
2010	7%
2011	3%
present	<0.1%

Windows Mobile's share of the smartphone market grew from its inception while new devices were being released. After peaking in 2007, it saw decline year-on-year.

In Q1 2003, Windows Mobile was the third largest operating system in the smart handheld market, behind Symbian and Palm OS.

In Q1 2004, Windows Mobile accounted for 23% of worldwide smartphone sales. Windows Mobile was projected in 2005 to overtake Symbian to become the leading mobile OS by 2010. In Q3 2004, Windows Mobile (CE) surpassed Palm OS to become the largest PDA operating system.

In Q4 2005, Microsoft shipped 2.2 million PDAs, which increased to 3.5 million in the same quarter the following year. Windows Mobile saw year over year growth between 2005 and 2006 of 38.8% which according to Gartner "helped Windows Mobile to solidify its stronghold on the market".

However, by 2008, its share had dropped to 14%. Microsoft licensed Windows Mobile to four out of the world's five largest mobile phone manufacturers, with Nokia being the exception.

Gartner research data showed that while the total smartphone industry grew 27% between 2008 and 2009, Windows Mobile's share of the smartphone market fell 2.7% in that same period. It also decreased by 20% in Q3 2009. At one time Windows Mobile was the most popular handset for business use, but by 2009 this was no longer the case; 24% of planned business deployments of mobile application in the United States were for Windows Mobile, putting it in 3rd place, behind BlackBerry (61%) and iPhone OS (27%);

In February 2009, Microsoft signed a deal with the third largest mobile phone maker, LG Electronics, to license Windows Mobile OS on 50 upcoming LG smartphone models. But in September 2009, Palm, Inc. announced it would drop Windows Mobile from its smartphone line-up. Gartner estimated that by the third quarter of 2009 Windows Mobile's share of worldwide smartphone sales was 7.9%. By August 2010, it was the least popular smartphone operating system, with a 5% share of the worldwide smartphone market (after Symbian, BlackBerry OS, Android and iOS). An October 2009 report in DigiTimes said that Acer would shift its focus from Windows Mobile to Google Android. The New York Times reported in 2009 that Windows Mobile "[was] foundering", as cellphone makers desert it in favor of Google's Android phone platform. It cited the difficulties in Microsoft's business model, which involves charging handset manufacturers up to $25 for each copy of Windows Mobile, while rival Google gives away Android for free. From late 2009 analysts and media reports began to express concerns about the future viability of the Windows Mobile platform, and whether Microsoft would keep supporting it into the future. Samsung announced in November 2009 that it would phase out the Windows Mobile platform, to concentrate on its own Bada operating system, Google's Android, and Microsoft's Windows Phone.

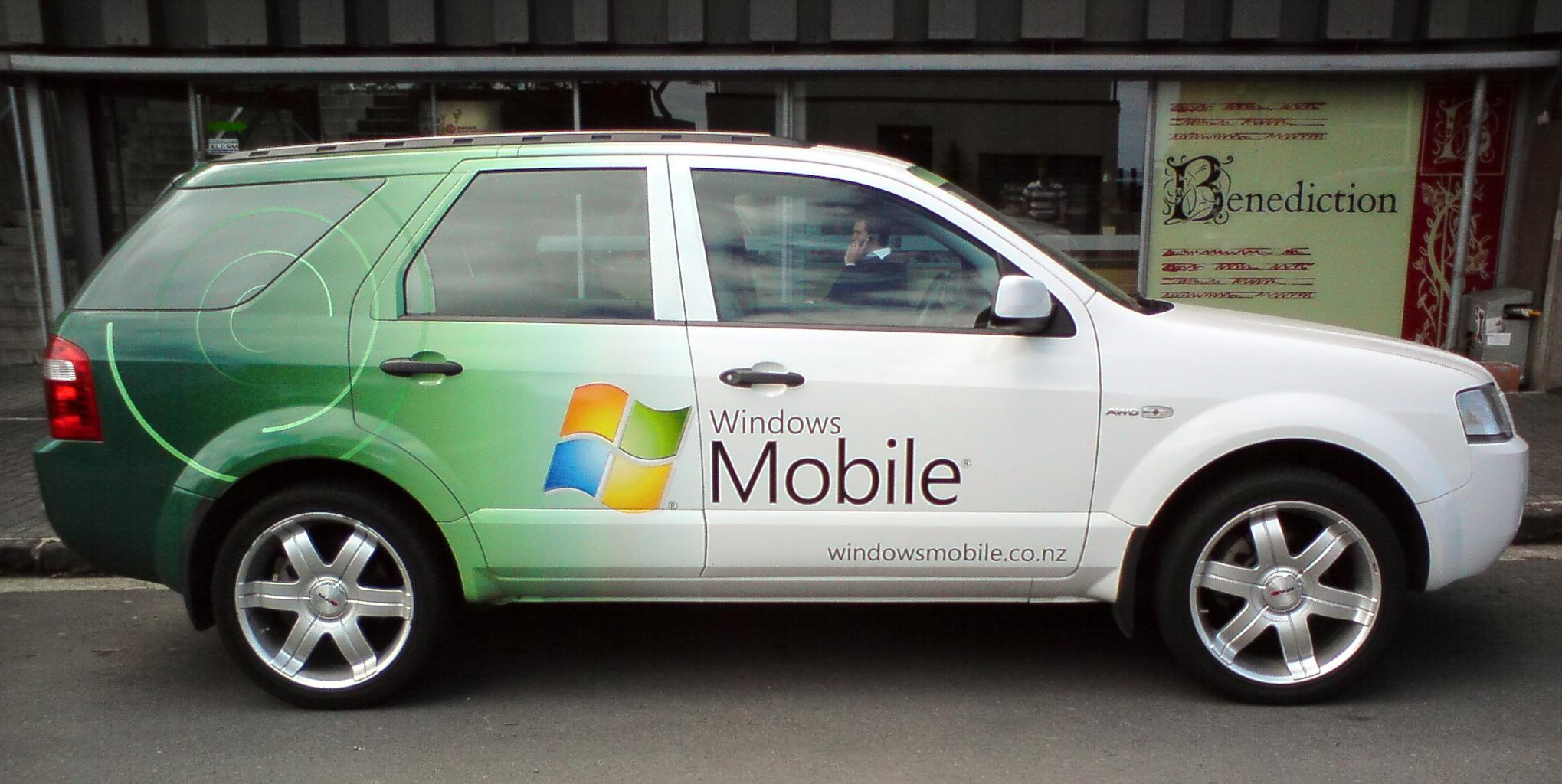
A Ford Territory with Windows Mobile advertising seen in Auckland, New Zealand, in 2008

== Software development ==
Software could be developed by third parties for the Windows Mobile operating system. Developers had several options for deploying mobile applications. These included writing native code with Visual C++, managed code that worked with the .NET Compact Framework, writing code in Tcl-Tk with eTcl, GCC using CeGCC, Python using PythonCE or server-side code that could be deployed using Internet Explorer Mobile or a mobile client on a user's device. The .NET Compact Framework was a subset of the .NET Framework and hence shared many components with software development on desktop clients, application servers, and web servers which had the .NET Framework installed, thus integrating networked computing space.

To aid developers Microsoft released software development kits (SDKs) that worked in conjunction with their Visual Studio development environment. These SDKs included emulator images for developers to test and debug their applications while writing them. Software could be tested on a client machine directly or be downloaded to a device. Microsoft also distributed Visual Studio 2008 / 2005 Professional Editions, and server/database counterparts to students as downloads free of charge via its DreamSpark program. Third party integrated development environments could also be used to write software such as Lazarus, Resco MobileForms Toolkit, Lexico, NS Basic and Basic4ppc. Some third party development environments allowed coding to be done on the device itself without the need for a computer.

Developer communities have used the SDK to port later versions of Windows Mobile OS to older devices and making the OS images available for free, thus providing the devices with newer feature sets. Microsoft had tolerated this procedure for some time but decided in February 2007 to ask developers to take their OS images off the net, which in turn raised discussions. At the same time Microsoft offered upgrades to Windows Mobile 6 versions to manufacturers for free.

On July 5, 2009, Microsoft opened a third-party application distribution service called Windows Marketplace for Mobile. In 2011, Windows Marketplace for Mobile stopped accepting new admissions. and then fully closed on May 9, 2012.

== Connectivity ==
In the early years of Windows Mobile devices were able to be managed and synced from a remote computer using ActiveSync; a data synchronization technology and protocol developed by Microsoft, originally released in 1996. This allowed servers running Microsoft Exchange Server, or other third party variants, to act as a personal information manager and share information such as email, calendar appointments, contacts or internet favorites.

With the release of Windows Vista, ActiveSync was replaced with Windows Mobile Device Center. Device Center is included with Vista and Windows 7 and provides many front end enhancements, allowing a home user to sync PIM information with Microsoft Outlook 2003 and later, photos from Windows Photo Gallery, videos or music from Windows Media Player and favorites with Internet Explorer; without the need for a server back end. Devices at this time also included a base driver compatible with Mobile Device Center so a user can connect to a computer without a need for any configuration.

== See also ==
- List of defunct consumer brands
