= HTC Desire X =

Smartphone

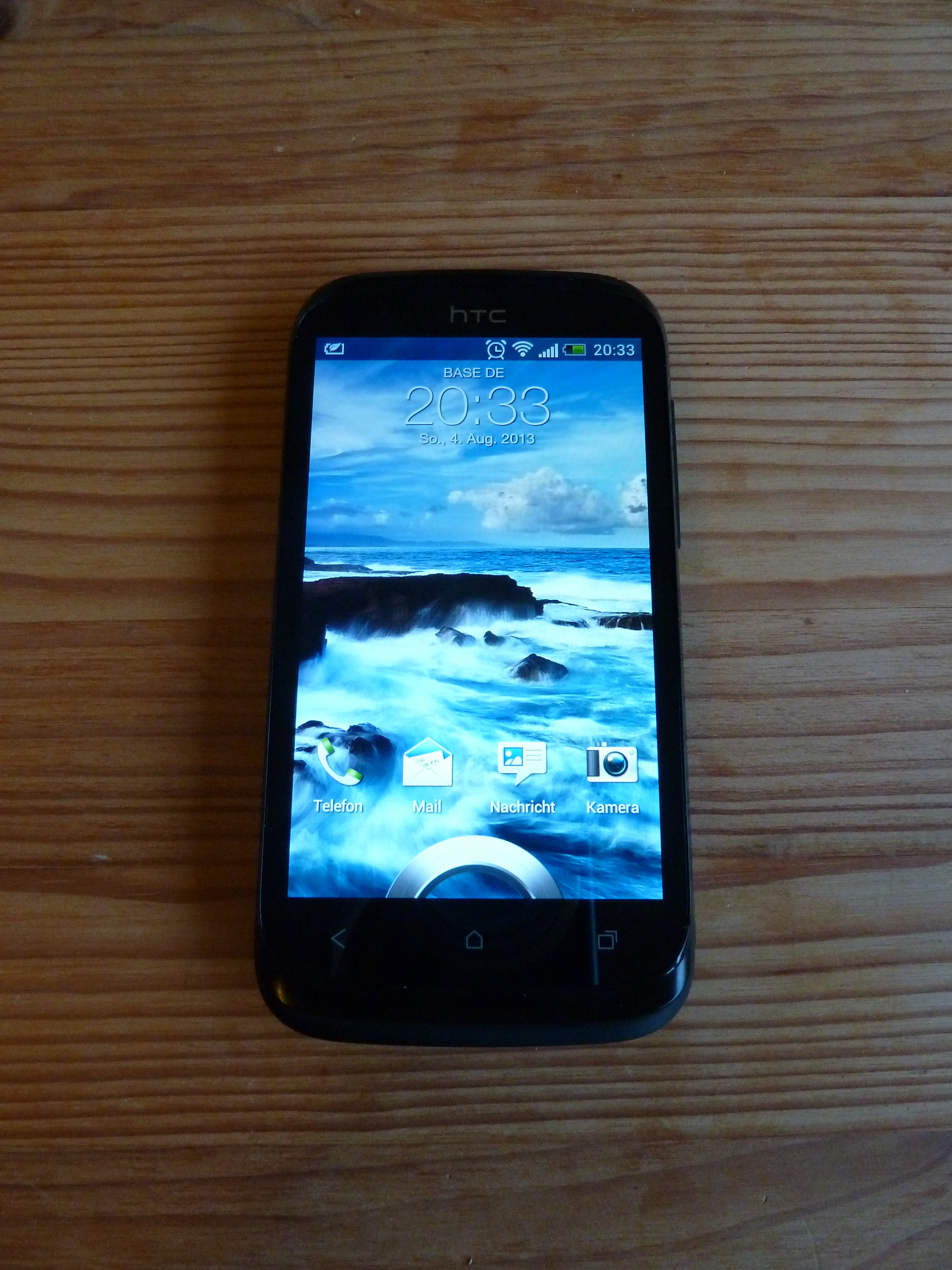
- An image of the HTC Desire X
- Brand: HTC
- Manufacturer: HTC Corporation
- Type: Smartphone
- Series: HTC Desire
- Availability by region: October 2012
- Predecessor: HTC Desire S
- Successor: HTC Desire 600, HTC Desire 601
- Related: HTC One X, HTC One S, HTC One V, HTC Desire S, HTC Desire
- Compatible networks: GSM/GPRS/EDGE; 850 900 1,800 1,900 MHz; UMTS/HSPA; 850, 900, 2100 MHz
- Form factor: Slate
- Dimensions: 118.5 mm (4.67 in) H 62.3 mm (2.45 in) W 9.3 mm (0.37 in) D
- Weight: 114 g (4.0 oz)
- Operating system: Android 4.0 Ice Cream Sandwich (upgradeable to Android 4.1 Jelly Bean), HTC Sense 4+ overlay
- System-on-chip: Qualcomm Snapdragon S4 MSM8225
- CPU: 1 GHz Dual-core ARM Cortex-A5
- GPU: Adreno 203
- Memory: 768 MB RAM
- Storage: 4 GB
- Removable storage: Yes (32 GB)
- Battery: 1650 mAh internal rechargeable li-ion
- Rear camera: 5-megapixel with autofocus, smart LED flash, BSI sensor, 480p video recording
- Front camera: No
- Display: 4 in (100 mm) Super LCD with RGB matrix WVGA (800×480) resolution (233 ppi)
- Media: Audio AAC, AMR, OGG, M4A, MIDI, MP3, WAV, WMA; Video 3GP, .3G2, MP4, WMV, AVI
- Connectivity: 3.5 mm stereo audio jack Bluetooth 4.0 with aptX enabled Wi-Fi: IEEE 802.11b/g/n DLNA micro-USB 2.0 (5-pin) port
- Data inputs: ambient light sensor, G-sensor, multi-touch capacitive touchscreen, proximity sensor
- Other: HTC Sense 4.0 user interface upgradable to HTC Sense 4.+

The HTC Desire X (codenamed Protou) was a smartphone designed and developed by HTC. The Desire X is a low-range handset incorporating a dual-core 1 GHz Snapdragon S4 play processor and 4 GB of internal storage expandable with a microSD slot. Aimed at customers of the HTC Desire, launched in 2010, the HTC has a 4-inch diagonal screen, and draws strong resemblance with HTC's 2012 flagship product, the HTC One X. The device came pre-installed with Android 4.0 Ice Cream Sandwich. It is the successor to the HTC Desire S, which was an upgrade from the HTC Desire, HTC's flagship product of 2010.

The Desire X was launched 29 August 2012 in Berlin during the IFA trade show. Although the price of the phone was not disclosed during the unveiling ceremony, the handset was expected to be released in Europe, the Middle East, Africa, and the Asia Pacific region in September 2012. Desire X was launched in India in October 2012 with a price tag of ₹19,500.
