= HTC Desire 601 =

2013 Android-based smartphone by HTC

- Manufacturer: HTC
- Type: Smartphone
- Series: Desire
- First released: October 2013
- Predecessor: HTC Desire X, HTC One VX
- Related: HTC One Mini
- Form factor: Slate
- Dimensions: 134.5 mm (5.30 in) H 66.7 mm (2.63 in) W 9.9 mm (0.39 in) D
- Weight: 130 g (5 oz)
- Operating system: Android 4.2.2 "Jelly Bean" (upgradable to Android 4.4.2 "KitKat")
- System-on-chip: Qualcomm Snapdragon 400
- CPU: 1.4 GHz dual-core Krait (1.2 GHz quad-core Cortex-A7 in dual SIM model)
- GPU: Adreno 305 (VideoCore IV (BCM23550) in dual-SIM version)
- Memory: 1 GB RAM
- Storage: 8 GB (4 GB in dual SIM model)
- Removable storage: MicroSDXC (up to 64 GB)
- Battery: 2100 mAh Li-Po removable battery
- Rear camera: 5-megapixel, 1.4 μm camera with auto focus, BSI image sensor, smart LED flash, dedicated imaging chip, continuous shooting 1080p HD video recording, HTC ImageChip
- Front camera: VGA
- Display: 4.5 in 540×960 pixels (245 ppi); Corning Gorilla Glass 2
- Connectivity: Wi-Fi: 802.11 a/b/g/n (2.4/5 GHz); GPS & GLONASS; Bluetooth 4.0 with apt-X; DLNA; Wi-Fi Direct; Miracast; Wi-Fi Hotspot; USB 2.0 (Micro-B Port, USB charging)
- Other: Accelerometer, proximity sensor, ambient light sensor

The HTC Desire 601 (branded in some markets as the HTC Desire, unrelated to the original Desire) is an Android smartphone designed and manufactured by HTC. The Desire 601 is a mid-range device carrying design traits from the HTC One and One Mini, utilizing a dual-core processor, 4.5-inch qHD display, and offering LTE support.

== Development and release ==
The Desire 601 was first revealed by evleaks in July 2013 under the codename "Zara", describing its design as being a mixture of the HTC One and recent Desire-branded devices, and indicating that it might be released on Sprint in the United States. The device was officially unveiled as the Desire 601 on 3 September 2013, with a release in Europe, the Middle East and Africa in October 2013. In the United Kingdom, it was exclusively released by Vodafone. On 18 November 2013, Sprint subsidiary Virgin Mobile USA announced it would release the Desire 601 under the name HTC Desire.

== Specifications ==
=== Design ===
The overall design of the HTC Desire 601 echoes that of the HTC One, with a soft polycarbonate shell, front-facing stereo speakers, and a pair of navigation keys. The device has a 4.5 inch display; there is a speaker grill, a front-facing camera and sensors at the upper bezel of the display while there are two capacitive buttons (back and menu buttons), an HTC logo and a speaker grill at the lower bezel of the display.

The side frame houses several buttons and ports; there is a microUSB port and a volume rocker at the right side, there is a 3.5 mm headphone jack and a power button at the top and there is a microUSB port at the bottom; the left side is empty.

At the back, there is a rear-facing camera coupled with an LED flash in addition to a "HTC" logo and a "Beats Audio" logo. The back cover is removable; removing the back cover reveals a removable battery, a SIM card slot and a microSD card slot.

The device measures 134.5 x 66.7 x 9.9 mm and weighs 130 grams. It is available in black, white and red.

=== Hardware ===
The HTC Desire 601 is powered by Qualcomm Snapdragon 400 system-on-chip with a 1.4 GHz dual-core Krait CPU and Adreno 305 GPU. It comes with 1 GB of RAM and 8 GB of internal storage which is expandable through the microSD card slot. It has a 4.5 inch qHD Super LCD 2 display with 540x960 pixels resolution. The device also supports LTE networks where available.

The device includes a 5-megapixel BSI rear-facing camera with f/2.0 aperture, 28mm focal length, 1/4" sensor size, autofocus and 1080p video recording at 30 fps along with a VGA front-facing camera. It also has HTC's custom in-house image processing called HTC ImageChip.

The device has a 2100 mAh removable battery; according to HTC, 3G talk-time was around 13 hours, and 3G stand-by time was around 18 days. It has front-firing BoomSound stereo speakers.

=== Software ===
The HTC Desire 601 ships with Android 4.2.2 Jelly Bean and HTC Sense 5, offering the BlinkFeed, Zoe, and Highlights features from the HTC One.

On 24 April 2014, HTC Singapore announced via its Facebook page that HTC Desire 601 started receiving an Android version update with Android 4.4.2 KitKat and HTC Sense 5.5 user interface.

== Reception ==
The Desire 601 was released to mixed reviews. Its build quality was considered to be in line with other HTC devices with "soft touch" polycarbonate exteriors, while its processor was considered to be fast for its class. The Desire 601's camera was considered to be well below average in comparison to the UltraPixel camera of the One and One Mini, while its speakers were panned for not being as powerful as their counterparts on the One. CNET was similarly conservative, noting that the 601's screen, despite being good enough for everyday use, was not high definition like its Motorola-produced competitor, the Moto G, and that the device's performance was sufficient for "casual bird-flinging gamers."

Hardware Zone noted that while it could not be compared to the higher quality metal construction of the One, the Desire 601 was praised for having a "comfortable" feel and a compact form that was sufficient for one-handed use, and its "powerful" camera hardware. However, the Desire 601 was panned for having a low resolution screen, underperforming on benchmarks in comparison to other phones in its class (such as the LG Optimus F5, Samsung Galaxy S4 Mini, and Sony Xperia SP), and for not being released soon enough to sufficiently compete. In conclusion it was felt that the Desire 601 "will not disappoint anyone who is looking for an affordable 4G LTE Android smartphone."

== HTC Desire 601 Dual SIM ==
On 27 November 2013, a Dual-SIM version of the HTC Desire 601 was released in Taiwan. Compared to the single SIM version, this model has 4 GB of internal storage rather than 8 GB and uses Broadcom BCM23550 system-on-chip instead of the Qualcomm Snapdragon 400 system-on-chip. Because of the system-on-chip difference, this model has a 1.2 GHz ARM Cortex-A7 quad-core CPU and VideoCore IV GPU instead of the 1.4 GHz Krait dual-core CPU and Adreno 305 GPU. Both of the SIM card slots are microSIM card slots and 3G compatible; unlike the normal version, this model lacks LTE support. It is available in black and white.
