= HTC Desire SV =

Android smartphone brand

- Brand: HTC
- Manufacturer: HTC Corporation
- Type: Smartphone
- Series: HTC Desire; HTC One
- Availability by region: October 2012
- Predecessor: HTC Desire V
- Successor: HTC Desire 600
- Related: HTC Desire V, HTC Desire X
- Compatible networks: GSM/GPRS/EDGE; 850 900 1,800 1,900 MHz; UMTS/HSPA/LTE; 850, 900, 2100 MHz dual GSM, 1 radio module
- Dimensions: 129.74 mm (5.108 in) H 67.9 mm (2.67 in) W 10.7 mm (0.42 in) D
- Weight: 131 g (4.6 oz)
- Operating system: Android 4.0.4 Ice Cream Sandwich, HTC Sense 4+ overlay upgradable to Android 4.1.2 Jellybean
- System-on-chip: Qualcomm Snapdragon S4 MSM8225; Qualcomm MSM8960 Snapdragon S4 Plus
- CPU: 1 GHz Dual-core ARM Cortex-A5; 1.2 GHz Dual-core Krait (One SV version)
- GPU: Adreno 203; Adreno 305 (One SV version)
- Memory: 768 MB DDR2 RAM; 1 GB DDR2 RAM
- Storage: 4 GB; 8 GB(One SV version)
- Removable storage: Yes (32 GB)
- Battery: 1620 mAh internal rechargeable li-ion 1800 mAh internal rechargeable li-ion
- Rear camera: 8-megapixel with autofocus, smart LED flash, BSI sensor, 480p video recording
- Front camera: 1.6 MP autofocus
- Display: 4.3 in (110 mm) Super LCD 2 with RGB matrix WVGA (800×480) resolution (217 ppi)
- Connectivity: 3.5 mm stereo audio jack with Beats Audio (for One SV only); Bluetooth 4.0 with aptX enabled Wi-Fi: IEEE 802.11b/g/n DLNA micro-USB 2.0 (5-pin) port
- Data inputs: ambient light sensor, G-sensor, multi-touch capacitive touchscreen, proximity sensor, E-compass
- Other: HTC Sense 4.0 user interface upgradable to HTC Sense 4.+

The HTC Desire SV and HTC One SV are Android smartphones manufactured and designed by HTC Corporation. It was released in India on November 2, 2012, which features a 4.3-inch Super LCD2 display.

It is powered by a dual-core Qualcomm S4 clocking at 1.0GHz (1.2GHz for the One SV) and a 1,800 mAh battery. It runs on Android 4.0.4 with HTC Sense 4.1 user interface.
