= HTC HD Mini =

2010 Smartphone running Windows Mobile

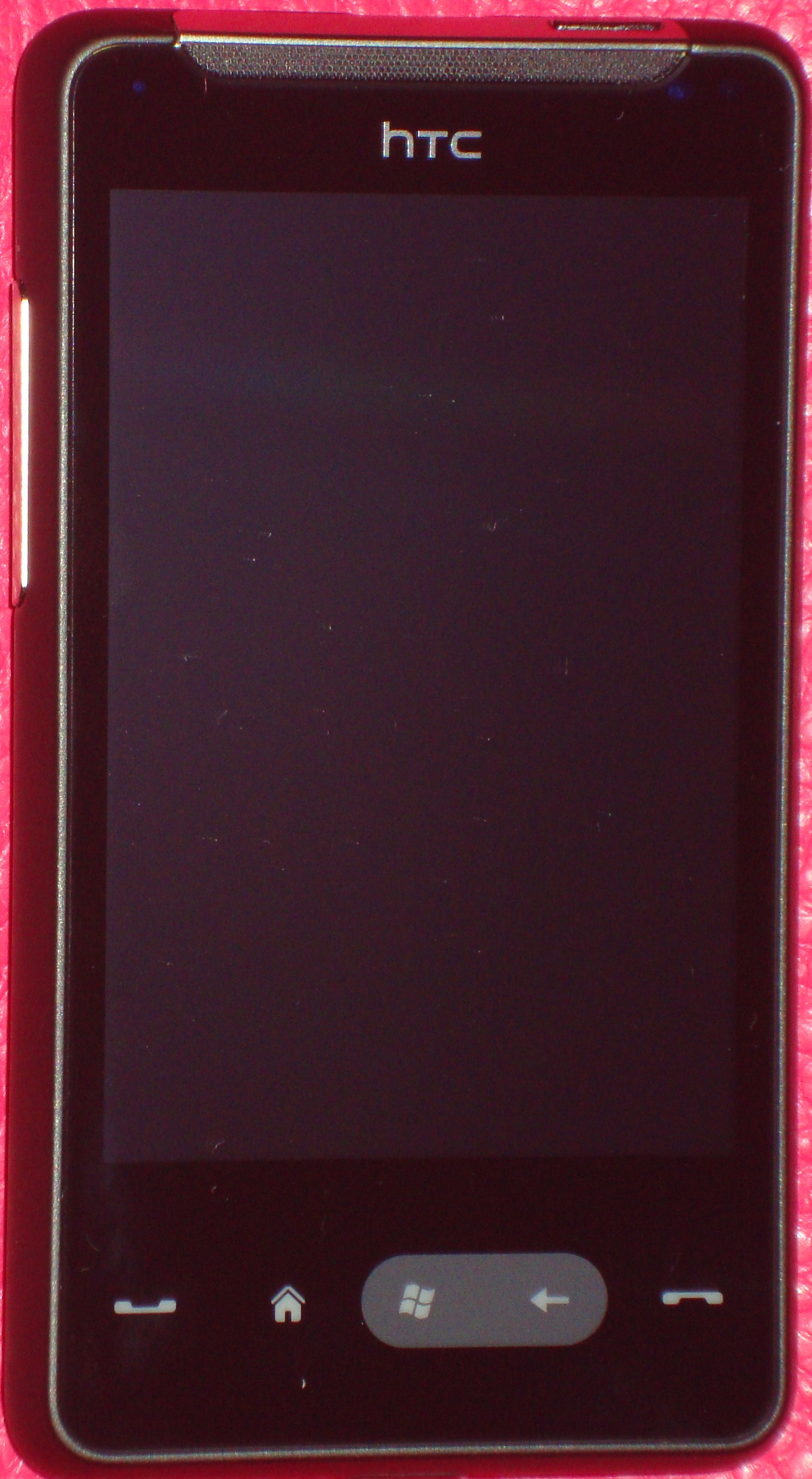
- Manufacturer: HTC Corporation
- Series: HTC Touch family
- Availability by region: April 2010; 16 years ago
- Related: HTC HD2, HTC Hero
- Compatible networks: GSM 850/900/1800/1900; HSDPA 900/2100
- Dimensions: 103.8×57.7×11.7 mm (4.09×2.27×0.46 in)
- Weight: 110 g (3.88 oz)
- Operating system: Official: Windows Mobile 6.5 Professional; Unofficial: Android
- System-on-chip: Qualcomm MSM7227
- CPU: 600 MHz Qualcomm Snapdragon S1; Adreno 200 GPU
- Memory: 512MB internal flash ROM; 384 MB RAM
- Removable storage: microSDHC, up to 32 GB
- Battery: Rechargeable 1200mAh Li-ion battery
- Display: 3.2 in. LCD capacitive touchscreen 320x480 px 65k-color, backlit TFT LCD, Corning Gorilla Glass
- Connectivity: Bluetooth, 802.11b/g, A-GPS, micro-USB, 3.5mm audio jack
- Data inputs: Multi-touch capacitive touchscreen, proximity sensor, 3-axis accelerometer

The HTC HD Mini is a smartphone running the Windows Mobile operating system with HTC Sense. The phone was designed and manufactured by HTC, and was first released in February 2010.

== Description ==
With a screen size of 81.2 mm (3.20 in) and weighing 3.88 ounces (110 grams) with battery, it is a compact version of its larger sibling, the HTC HD2, although being powered by a lower speed 600 MHz Qualcomm processor and a 512 MB ROM/384 MB RAM storage combination. Other features include multi-touch display, 5 megapixel color camera with auto focus; internal GPS antenna; 3G broadband connectivity, Wi-Fi and FM radio. As compared to the HD2's WVGA resolution, the HD Mini has HVGA, in tandem with the smaller screen. The camera has no flash and the home screen can not be customized.

The HTC HD mini includes capacitive touch for viewing, zooming and resizing websites, Microsoft Office files, PDF documents and pictures.

The HD Mini runs Windows Mobile 6.5.3 although it is covered up by a custom user interface named Sense.

== Reception ==
CNET gave the HD Mini an 8.3/10, praising the phone itself but disliking Windows Mobile 6. The Register and SlashGear gave mostly positive reviews but noted that other competitors were better and that Windows Mobile 7 was about to release which could break compatibility.

== See also ==
- HTC Touch Family
- HTC Touch HD
- HTC HD2 – the original phone on which the HD Mini is based on
- HTC HD7 – the successor to the HD2
