= HTC Bravo and Eris =

The name HTC Desire has been used for two devices produced by HTC Corporation:

- The codename of the HTC Droid Eris, a variant of the HTC Hero
- The brand name of the HTC Bravo
