= HTC Desire Eye =

2014 Android smartphone

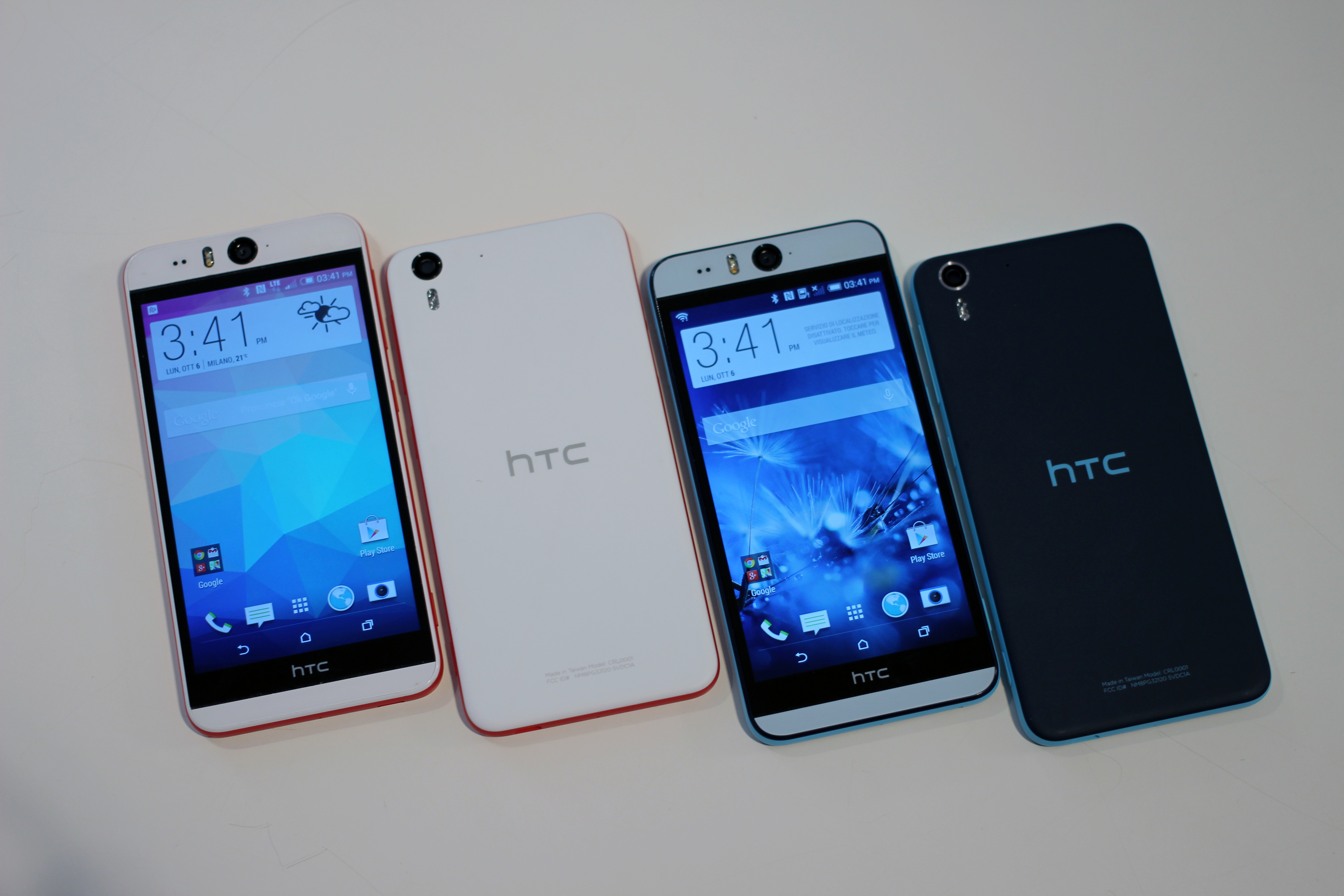
- Manufacturer: HTC
- Type: Touchscreen smartphone
- Series: HTC Desire
- First released: October 2014
- Availability by region: 7 November 2014
- Compatible networks: 2G, 3G, 4G
- Form factor: Slate
- Dimensions: 151.7×73.8×8.5 mm (5.97×2.91×0.33 in)
- Weight: 154 g (5.43 oz)
- Operating system: Original: Android 4.4.4 "KitKat"; Current: Android 6.0.1 Marshmallow"; Unofficial: Android 12 via LineageOS
- System-on-chip: Qualcomm Snapdragon 801
- CPU: 2.3 GHz quad-core Krait 400
- GPU: Adreno 330
- Memory: 2 GB LPDDR3 RAM
- Storage: 16 GB flash
- Removable storage: up to 128 GB
- Battery: 2400 mAh
- Rear camera: 13MP MP
- Front camera: 13MP with dual LED flash
- Display: 5.2 inch
- Connectivity: WLAN: Wi-Fi 802.11 a/b/g/n, dual-band, Wi-Fi Direct, DLNA, Wi-Fi hotspot, Bluetooth: v4.0, A2DP, USB: microUSB v2.0
- Data inputs: Capacitive touch screen, Multitouch
- Model: OPHF200
- Codename: M910x
- Website: www.htc.com/in/smartphones/htc-desire-eye/

The HTC Desire Eye is an Android smartphone manufactured by HTC. The phone was announced on 8 October 2014 and was released on 7 November 2014 exclusively for AT&T in the United States and exclusively for Three in the United Kingdom. It is known as the selfie phone because the front camera has the same quality of imaging as the rear camera.

== Features ==
The Desire Eye comes with preloaded Android 4.4 and HTC Sense 6.0. An upgrade to Android Lollipop 5.0.2 was released in March 2015 while Android Marshmallow 6.0.1 was released in March 2016.

== Hardware ==
The Desire Eye features similar hardware to the flagship HTC One M8; the differences are its waterproofing capabilities, dual-tone polycarbonate plastic uni-body, and slightly bigger display at 5.2 inches. It packs a 2.3 GHz quad core Qualcomm Snapdragon 801 CPU, Adreno 330 GPU, 2 GB of RAM, and front and back cameras have 13 MP resolution with both having dual LED flash. It comes with a 2400 mAh battery and supports Quick Charge 2.0 by Qualcomm. It is equipped with two HTC BoomSound front-facing speakers hidden at the top and bottom edge of the display panel. Storage is 16 GB and it can take up to 128 GB expandable storage.

== Reception ==
The HTC Desire Eye received positive reviews from critics. Andrew Hoyle of Cnet gave it a score 8 out of 10 and said "Its screen is bright and bold, it has plenty of power and its colourful body is waterproof". Chris Velazco of Engadget.com gave it a score of 74 out of 100 and praised the phone for its impressive performance.

Despite receiving positive reviews for its performance, the Desire Eye failed at what it was marketed for. The front-facing and back cameras received poor responses from critics. Jeff Parsons of TechRadar called the camera "Average" and said "The strength of the Desire Eye isn't in its 13MP cameras but its unibody design and flagship-baiting specifications".
