= HTC Sensation XL =

Cell phone model

- Brand: HTC
- Manufacturer: HTC Corporation
- Type: Smartphone
- Series: HTC Sensation
- First released: May 19, 2011; 15 years ago (Vodafone)
- Predecessor: HTC Desire HD
- Successor: HTC One X
- Related: HTC Rezound, HTC Sensation XE, HTC Titan
- Compatible networks: GSM/GPRS/EDGE; 850 900 1800 1900 MHz; UMTS/HSPA; 850 1900 2100 or 900 1700 2100 MHz; HSDPA 14.4 Mbps; HSUPA 5.76 Mbps
- Form factor: Slate
- Dimensions: 132.5 mm (5.22 in) H 70.7 mm (2.78 in) W 9.9 mm (0.39 in) D
- Weight: 162.5 g (5.73 oz)
- Operating system: Android 2.3.3 Gingerbread (upgradeable to 4.0), HTC Sense 3.0 overlay
- System-on-chip: Qualcomm Snapdragon S2 MSM8255
- CPU: 1.5 GHz Qualcomm Scorpion
- GPU: Qualcomm Adreno 205
- Memory: 768 MB RAM
- Storage: 16 GB (13 GB user accessible)
- Removable storage: N/A
- Battery: 1600 mAh internal rechargeable li-ion User replaceable
- Rear camera: 8-megapixel (3264×2448) with autofocus and dual LED flash, 720p HD video recording @ 30 frame/s with tap-to-focus and digital zoom
- Front camera: VGA fixed-focus color camera (0.3-megapixel)
- Display: 4.7 in (120 mm) LCD Gorilla glass touch screen with WVGA (480×800) resolution
- Connectivity: 3.5 mm TRRS connector, Bluetooth 3.0 with A2DP, FM stereo receiver (87.5-108 MHz) with RDS, Micro USB 2.0 (5-pin) port with Mobile High-definition Link for USB or HDMI connection, Wi-Fi 802.11b/g/n
- Data inputs: A-GPS, ambient light sensor, digital compass, G-sensor, gyroscope, multi-touch capacitive touchscreen, proximity sensor
- Other: USB and Wi-Fi tethering, HTC Sense v3.5

HTC Sensation XL is touchscreen-based, slate-sized Android smartphone manufactured by HTC. It was announced on October 6, 2011 by HTC on their Beats Audio event at London and released worldwide on October 26, 2011. The Sensation XL was HTC's second phone that was equipped with Beats Audio sound enhancer technology, after the earlier HTC Sensation XE. Two editions of the HTC Sensation XL were released; the only difference between these two models was that the limited edition was shipped with is Beats Solo's while the normal edition was shipped with the in-ear earphones of those on the Sensation XE.

== Specifications ==
=== Design ===
The HTC Sensation XL measures 132.5 x 70.7 x 9.9 mm, not considerably bigger than handsets with 4.3-inch screens. It weighs 162.5 grams, some 14.5 grams heavier than the HTC Sensation. It has a 4.7-inch display; there's a front-facing 1.3 MP video-call camera, a proximity sensor and an ambient light sensor alongside a charging/notification LED that remains invisible when it is off at the upper bezel of the display and there are four capacitive touch keys for the Menu, Option, Back and Search functions at the lower bezel of the display.

The back of the device was made almost entirely of aluminium; there is an 8 MP camera lens sitting between a dual LED flash combo and a loudspeaker at the back. On the side frame; there is a microUSB port at the left side, there is a volume rocker at the right side; there is a 3.5 mm audio jack, a secondary microphone for active noise cancellation and a power/lock button at the top and there is a microphone at the bottom. The back panel is removable; however, the device doesn't have a microSD card slot for memory expansion.

=== Hardware ===
The HTC Sensation XL features Qualcomm Snapdragon MSM8255 SoC with 1.5 GHz ARM Cortex-A9 Scorpion CPU, 768 MB RAM, Wi-Fi 802.11 b/g/n, FM radio, Bluetooth 3.0, GPS, and 16 GB of internal storage. The device also features a standard array of sensors including a digital compass, proximity sensor, gyroscope, accelerometer and ambient light sensor. It has a 4.7 inch S-LCD with 480x800 pixels (WVGA) resolution, 16:10 aspect ratio, 199 ppi pixel density and Gorilla Glass protective glass. It has an 8 MP rear camera with 28 mm focal length, 3264x2448 pixels resolution and f/2.2 aperture. The rear camera is coupled with dual LED flash and capable of 720p video recording at 30 fps. It also has a 1.3 MP front-facing camera.

==== Battery ====
The HTC Sensation XL is powered by a 1600 mAh Li-Ion removable battery, which can last 40 hours when subjected to general usage. The battery life was substantial during 3G calls – nine hours and thirty minutes, longer than the advertised six hours and fifty minutes. The Sensation XL lasts for around five hours and twenty minutes during web browsing with Wi-Fi, and around six hours and ten minutes when watching videos.

=== Software ===
The HTC Sensation XL features the Android 2.3.5 Gingerbread mobile operating system with the HTC Sense 3.5 user interface. Like its elder sibling, HTC Sensation XE, the Sensation XL was the second phone produced by HTC to have integrated Beats Audio sound enhancer. On May 29, 2012, HTC Sensation XL received an upgrade to Android 4.0.3 Ice Cream Sandwich and HTC Sense 3.6 user interface.

== See also ==
- HTC Sensation
