= LG DoublePlay =

Android smartphone model

- Operating system: Android 2.3
- Memory: 512 MB
- Battery: 1500mAh
- Display: 320 x 480

LG DoublePlay was an Android smartphone manufactured by LG Electronics for mobile operator T-Mobile. It was presented and launched in October 2011. It featured two displays.

It includes a split QWERTY keyboard, a capacitive TFT display with a diagonal of 3.5 inches, a resolution of 320 x 480 points with a dot density of 165 ppi and an Android 2.3 operating system.

It uses a Qualcomm Snapdragon chipset with a 1.0 GHz Scorpion processor, the internal storage capacity is 2 GB, expandable with a microSD card up to 32 GB, and the RAM is 512 MB.

Its single camera has a resolution of 5 MP. The Li-Ion battery has a capacity of 1500mAh and is removable.
