= HTC One S =

Android smartphone manufactured by HTC

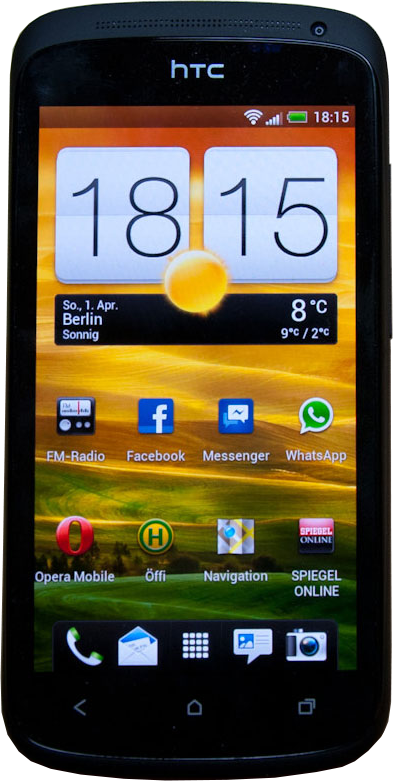
- Brand: HTC
- Manufacturer: HTC Corporation
- Type: Smartphone
- Series: HTC One
- First released: March 30, 2012
- Availability by region: EU: 5 April 2012 US: 25 April 2012
- Predecessor: HTC Amaze 4G, HTC Sensation
- Successor: HTC One Mini
- Related: HTC One X, HTC One V, HTC One XL
- Compatible networks: GSM/GPRS/EDGE; 850 900 1800 1900 MHz; UMTS/HSPA (Z520m variant); 850 900 1700 1900 2100 MHz
- Dimensions: 130.9 mm (5.15 in) H 65 mm (2.6 in) W 7.8 mm (0.31 in) D
- Weight: 119.5 g (4.22 oz)
- Operating system: Android 4.0.3 Ice Cream Sandwich, HTC Sense 4.1 overlay, upgradeable to Android 4.1.1 Jelly Bean and HTC Sense UI 4+ (Update to Sense 5 discontinued)
- System-on-chip: Qualcomm Snapdragon S4 Plus MSM8960 for Z520e variant and Qualcomm Snapdragon S3 MSM8260 for Z560e variant
- CPU: 1.5 GHz Dual-core Qualcomm Krait for Z520e variant or 1.7 GHz Dual-core Qualcomm Scorpion for Z560e variant
- GPU: Adreno 225 for Z520e variant or Adreno 220 for Z560e variant
- Memory: 1 GB RAM
- Storage: 16 GB
- Removable storage: No
- Battery: 1650 mAh internal rechargeable li-ion
- Rear camera: 8-megapixel (3,264×2,448) with autofocus, smart LED flash, BSI sensor, 1080p HD video recording
- Front camera: VGA
- Display: 4.3 in (110 mm) Super AMOLED with RGBG-matrix (PenTile) qHD (540×960) resolution covered with Gorilla glass
- Connectivity: 3.5 mm stereo audio jack Bluetooth 4.0 with aptX enabled Wi-Fi: IEEE 802.11b/g/n DLNA micro-USB 2.0 (5-pin) port with mobile high-definition video link (MHL) for USB or HDMI connection
- Data inputs: ambient light sensor, digital compass, G-sensor, gyroscope, multi-touch capacitive touchscreen, proximity sensor
- SAR: Head: 0.393 W/kg 1 g Body: 1.181 W/kg 1 g Hotspot: 1.181 W/kg 1 g
- Other: HTC Sense 4.1 user interface

The HTC One S (codenamed Ville) is a premium smartphone designed and manufactured by HTC as part of the HTC One series which has Beats Audio and runs the Android 4.0 "Ice Cream Sandwich" mobile operating system with HTC Sense. Announced by HTC on 26 February 2012, the HTC One S was scheduled for official release on 2 April 2012. The first phones were sold on March 30. In the United States, the One S is carried by T-Mobile and Solavei.

Slotted between the low-end HTC One V and the high-end HTC One X in the HTC One lineup, the One S's specs and positioning are close to that of the flagship One X. The One S and One X sold in North America share the same dual-core processor. However, the One S lacks LTE. The One S has an aluminum body and a 4.3-inch 960x 540 pixel (qHD) Super AMOLED display with PenTile matrix with a pixel density of 256 pixels per inch, compared to the One X's polycarbonate body and a 4.7-inch (120 mm) 1,280x720 pixel (RGB matrix) Super LCD 2 display with a pixel density of 312 pixels per inch.

The One S's use of a PenTile display makes it more energy efficient and thinner than equivalent LCD screens, giving it better battery life than the One X. While their rear-facing cameras use identical 8-megapixel sensors, for the front-facing camera the One S has a VGA cam and video capture fixed at 640 x 480 resolution compared to the One X's 1.3-megapixel sensor with 720p HD video capture. In North America, the One S and One X are usually not sold by the same carrier; for instance, T-Mobile and Telus offer the One S. In contrast, AT&T and Rogers sell the One X. An update to Sense 5 and Android 4.2.2 was announced and later cancelled. The reason HTC gave was that there are two distinct versions of this phone with different SoCs, and since Qualcomm ended support for it, they said it would be expensive to make the update. To avoid confusion, they canceled it.

== Features ==
=== Hardware ===
The One S is 0.31 inches (7.9 mm) at its thinnest point. The phone uses an aluminum unibody shell, with two finishes available - a black micro arc oxidized finish, and a light-blue to dark-blue gradient anodized finish (currently the only finish available through T-Mobile USA). HTC states that the micro arc oxidized finish makes the body five times stronger than the bare aluminium and the iPhone's stainless steel, although some users claim that the finish chips easily. The phone has a power/lock button and a 3.5 mm headphone jack at the top, a volume rocker on the upper right side, and a MHL/Micro USB port on the upper left. Three capacitive buttons (back, home, and task switcher) are located on the front of the phone, below the display. There are two speakers: one on the front (the earpiece) and one on the back. A two-color notification LED (amber and green) sits under the earpiece grille. The top piece of plastic on the back is removable and is where the phone accepts a micro-SIM card.

=== Display ===
The One S's Super AMOLED display measures 4.3 inches (110 mm) diagonally, with a resolution of 960×540 pixels (qHD resolution) and pixel density of 256ppi, and is protected by a sheet of Corning Gorilla Glass. The display uses a PenTile RGBG subpixel arrangement.

=== Cameras ===
The primary camera has an eight megapixel, backside-illuminated sensor, an f/2.0 autofocus lens, and a single LED flash with five brightness levels. The camera can also record 1080p video at 30 frames per second. The camera uses a special image processing chip, the ImageChip, which HTC claims enhances image quality and allows for faster start-up and focus times (0.7 and 0.2 seconds respectively). HTC's custom camera software, ImageSense, includes multiple modes, including HDR, panorama, and burst modes, and also allows still photos to be taken while recording video. The One S also includes a front-facing camera with VGA resolution.

=== Processor and memory ===
One version of the One S uses a Qualcomm Snapdragon S4 Plus MSM8960 SoC (system on chip), which includes a 1.5 GHz dual-core Krait CPU and an Adreno 225 GPU, as well as an integrated HSPA+ modem, GPS/GLONASS module, Wi-Fi b/g/n radio, Bluetooth, and FM radio. The One S also features a standard array of sensors, including an accelerometer, proximity sensor, and ambient light sensor. The phone provides 1 GB of RAM and 16 GB of built-in storage; however, the phone lacks a microSD slot for additional storage.

In specific markets, such as Taiwan, India, and some European (usually Eastern European) markets, the One S uses the older Snapdragon S3 MSM8260 SoC, with a 1.7 GHz dual-core Scorpion CPU and Adreno 220 GPU. In some markets, both devices are available, notably the UK. The change is speculated to be caused by a shortage of Snapdragon S4 chips. The two versions have slightly different packaging, the S4 is model Z520e/Z520m and states "Processor: Dual Core, 1.5GHz"/"CPU Speed 1.5 GHz, dual core, whereas the S3 is model Z560e and states "Processor: Dual Core". This model is codenamed "VilleC2", and is known as the One S C2.

=== Battery ===
The One S is powered by an integrated (non-user-replaceable) 1,650 mAh battery. HTC claims up to 10.5 hours of talk time and up to 13.2 days of stand-by time. The internal battery is accessible when the phone is opened up by removing the top and bottom snap-on covers, 6 screws, the snap-on metal body frame, and a small patch of adhesive holding down the battery to the circuit board.

=== Software ===
Like other HTC Android devices, the HTC Sense interface is present on top of the base Android system. The One S was launched with Android 4.0.3 "Ice Cream Sandwich", which was later upgraded to 4.0.4 in some markets. HTC announced a 4.1 "Jelly Bean" update. A FAQ was created in November for people questioning Jelly Bean on their HTC Device. HTC claimed that the update would be released by Q1 2013 at the latest, but in July 2013, the company announced that they will discontinue updates to the HTC One S. As of September 2014, CyanogenMod 11 (Android 4.4 KitKat) is being developed for the HTC One S and is very stable. As of November 2014, the One S has a completely functional and stable CyanogenMod 12. The One S C2 has a mostly stable CM 11 build thanks to bilal_liberty and SultanXDA on XDA with Android 5.0 "Lollipop" possibly in the works.

==== Campaign to continue software support ====
On July 3, 2013, a petition was created by XDA member DylRicho (although cited as Dylan Richards on the petition page) to campaign against HTC's recent decision to axe the device from further updates. Within 24 hours of being live, it received over 1,100 signatures. As of July 5, 2013, it had over 3,450 supporters and eventually collected over 11,000 signatures. The petition has received widespread coverage over various news websites as it continues to gain supporters. (Note: Attributed to multiple references:) In the petition, Richards states that the One S "is still one of the best phones on the market, on par with the dual-core and quad-core Samsung Galaxy S III phones and HTC's own One X." He also discussed the company's update release schedule, saying, "The HTC customer service and upgrade service are absolutely dreadful." Furthermore, Richards pointed out that various videos had gone live on YouTube, showing the One S running Android 4.2.2 and HTC Sense 5.0 with "no performance loss from the upgrade." He even went as far as to say that "HTC needs to get its priorities in the correct place."

More recently, a Facebook page and group have been made for the situation. The petition page has been updated to notify all supporters that HTC had responded to the petition when a following user decided to contact the company. The updated message includes an email response from an HTC official, whereby they acknowledge the frustrations of One S users, and that the company understands perfectly. A final decision has not yet been made on whether the handset will receive updates, with HTC urging concerned users to follow its Facebook and Twitter pages for updates on the situation. The representative also noted that One S users should keep calm and be patient until further news is available. As of January 2014, a semi-official ROM (sources taken from the HTC One XL update ROM, direct from HTC) is available for Snapdragon S4 model variants via XDA Developers that includes Android 4.2.2 and HTC Sense 5, essentially bringing across exactly the same features that the HTC One X was provided by HTC, including BlinkFeed and new camera features (excluding HTC Zoe, which has specific hardware requirements which are only available for the 2013 HTC One series).

== Variants ==
=== HTC J ===
The HTC J is a Japanese smartphone with many of the exact specifications as the One S, but with a larger 1810 mAh battery, a microSD slot, and support for WiMAX. Its unibody is also waterproof.

=== HTC One SC ===
The HTC One SC is a variant of the HTC One S that supports both CDMA2000 and GSM networks simultaneously. It is currently available only in Mainland China, Indonesia, and Taiwan. It also has a variant that supports TD-SCDMA (HTC ONE ST) and a variant that support WCDMA (HTC ONE SU). Their hardware is almost identical. They all have a 4.3-inch screen, 1 GB RAM, 4 GB ROM, 5 megapixels, and Android 4.0.

=== Special Edition ===
The One S Special Edition is a variant of the One S available only in Taiwan. The scheduled release date for the UK and the USA was March 2013. The Special Edition includes larger internal storage (64 GB, compared to 16 GB previously) and a white body; in all other respects it is identical to the standard Snapdragon S4-powered One S.

== Availability ==
In the United States, T-Mobile is the exclusive carrier of the HTC One S.

In Canada, Videotron Mobile indicated that the HTC One S is "coming soon". Mobilicity added the device to its lineup on September 7, 2012, for $499.99, with activation at the time of purchase. Wind Mobile started selling the One S on September 11, 2012. As of November 2012, the phone is also available through Virgin Mobile at a price of $399.99. Rogers Wireless has also sold this device, and it is also in the current Fido smartphone lineup.

== See also ==
- HTC One series
