= HTC Legend =

Smartphone manufactured by HTC

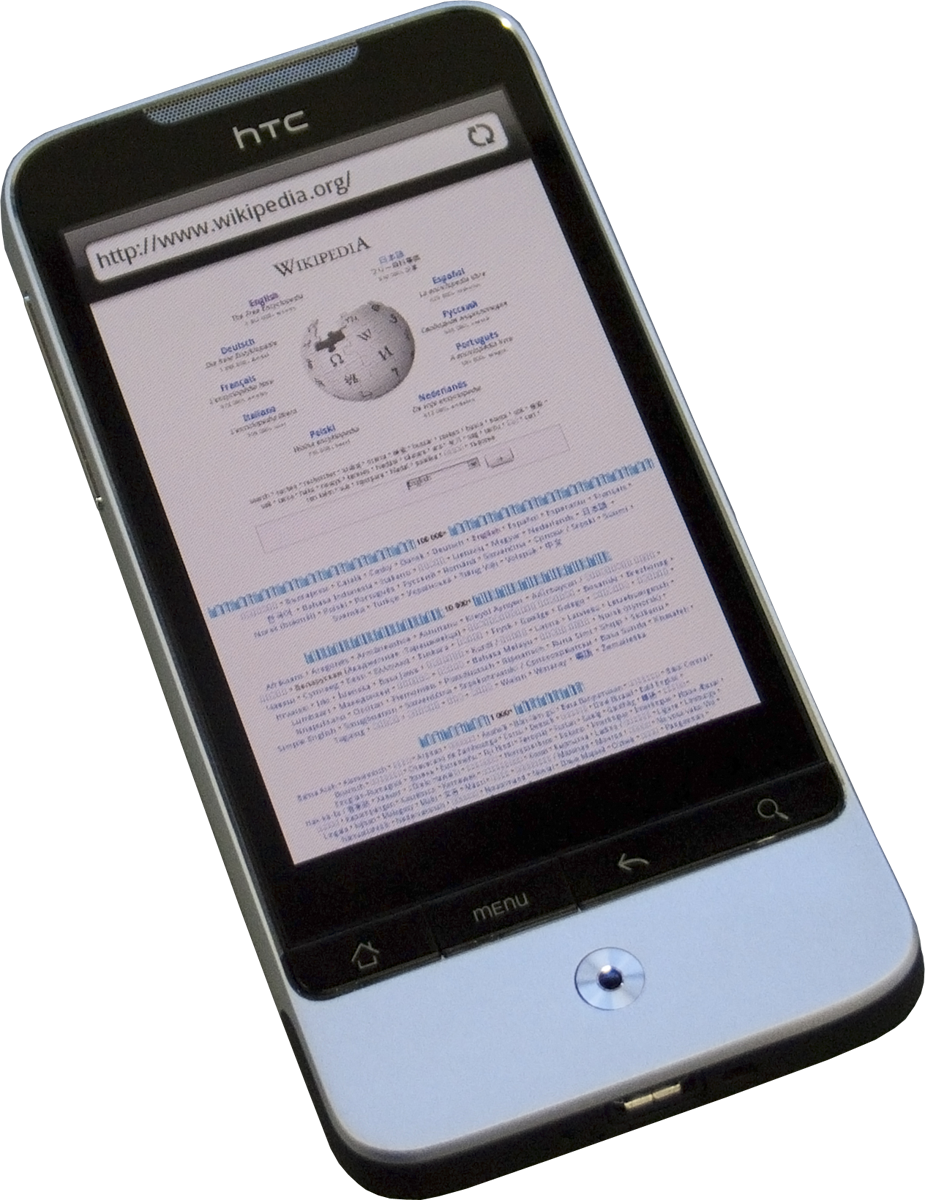
- Manufacturer: HTC
- Type: Slate smartphone
- Series: A Series
- First released: 1 April 2010
- Predecessor: HTC Hero
- Successor: HTC One V
- Compatible networks: GSM 850/900/1800/1900 MHz HSPA/WCDMA 900 2100 MHz
- Dimensions: 112 mm (4.4 in) H 56.3 mm (2.22 in) W 11.5 mm (0.45 in) D
- Weight: 126 g (4.4 oz)
- Operating system: Android 2.1 "Eclair" (upgradable to 2.2 "Froyo") with HTC Sense (unofficially upgradable to 2.3.7 "Gingerbread" with CyanogenMod 7)
- CPU: Qualcomm MSM 7227 600 MHz processor
- Memory: 384 MB RAM; 512 MB ROM
- Storage: microSD memory card (SD 2.0 compatible) microSD slot: supports up to 32 GB
- Battery: 1300 mAh; Internal rechargeable lithium-ion battery
- Rear camera: 5 megapixel with auto focus, widescreen photo capture, geotagging
- Display: 320 × 480 px (0.15 megapixels), 3.2 in (81 mm), 180 PPI, HVGA, AMOLED
- Connectivity: Wi-Fi (802.11 b/g), Bluetooth 2.1+EDR
- Data inputs: Multi-touch capacitive touchscreen display, volume controls, proximity and ambient light sensors, GPS
- Hearing aid compatibility: M4

The HTC Legend is a smartphone manufactured by HTC in Taiwan that runs the Android operating system. It was unveiled by HTC during the Mobile World Congress in Barcelona on 16 February 2010 and went on sale on 10 March 2010.

The Legend is the successor to the HTC Hero and is slimmer and smaller than its predecessor with minor hardware enhancements. It has a 3.2-inch active-matrix OLED (AMOLED) display.

The Legend's body is made from one block of aluminium. It has a removable battery, which slides out from a compartment at the bottom of the phone. In North America, it was first offered by Virgin Mobile Canada and Bell.

In Malaysia, the HTC Legend debuted on 3 major operators CelcomDigi, Maxis and Celcom.

At its release, the unit shipped with Android 2.1 (codenamed Eclair). Starting November 2010, there was a firmware update to Android 2.2 (codenamed Froyo). The update was customized by various carriers to suit their respective networks, and as such has been released to different groups at different times. Most upgrades are expected to occur over the air.

Vodafone and Virgin were first to release the update to the European public on 15 November 2010. HTC released the update to unlocked handsets throughout Europe on 9 December 2010 and throughout India, Indonesia, Malaysia and Taiwan on 15 December 2010. The update was released to Canadian customers on Bell Mobility and Virgin Mobile on 16 March 2011.

== Reception ==
Early reviews of the HTC Legend have been mostly positive, with critics praising its design and improved HTC Sense user interface and increased performance over its predecessor, the HTC Hero. Critics have also praised the optical trackpad at the bottom of the phone which replaces the analogue trackball on the HTC Hero with a better design, whilst complementing the aesthetics of the phone.

CNET UK reviewed the phone on 8 March and awarded the phone 9.2/10.

Gizmodo reviewed the phone on 8 March and praised it for its build quality, incremental hardware upgrade, improved responsiveness, and new features making it a good successor to the HTC Hero.

Nonetheless, some users are reporting issues, notably with the antenna and call reception quality, and a lack of consistent carrier support.
