= HTC Sensation =

Smartphone model

HTC Sensation, HTC Sensation XE
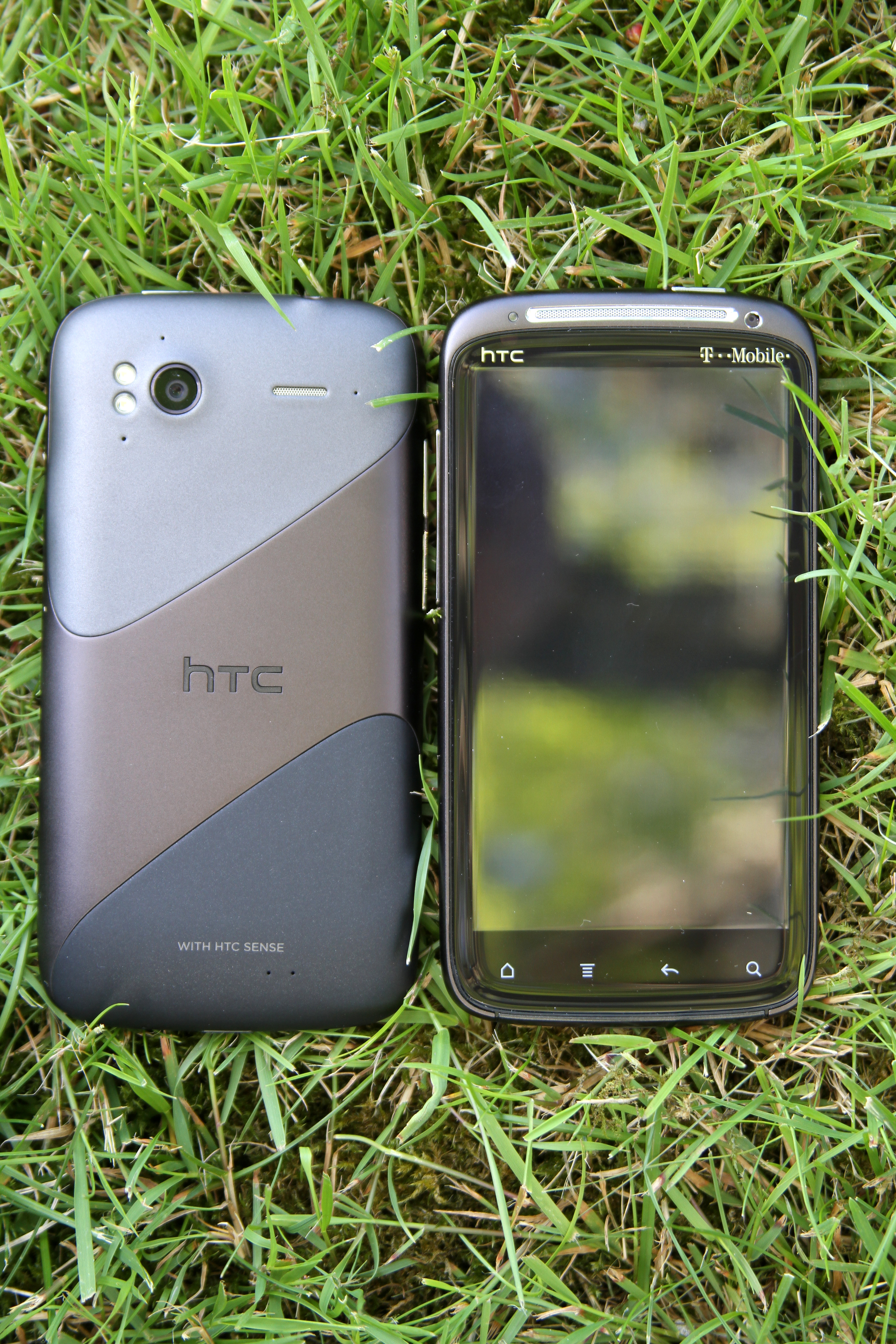
- HTC Sensation
- Brand: HTC
- Manufacturer: HTC Corporation
- Type: Smartphone
- First released: Europe May 19, 2011; 15 years ago (Vodafone)
- Predecessor: HTC Desire HD
- Successor: HTC One X (by range); HTC One S (by size)
- Related: HTC Amaze 4G, HTC Rezound; HTC Raider 4G
- Compatible networks: GSM/GPRS/EDGE; 850 900 1800 1900 MHz; UMTS/HSPA; 850 1900 2100 or 900 1700 2100 MHz; HSDPA 14.4 Mbps; HSUPA 5.76 Mbps
- Form factor: Slate
- Dimensions: 126.1 mm (4.96 in) H 65.4 mm (2.57 in) W 11.3 mm (0.44 in) D
- Weight: 148 g (5.2 oz)
- Operating system: Android 2.3.3 Gingerbread with HTC Sense 3.0; Upgradable to 4.0.3 with HTC Sense 3.6; 7.1.2 with custom ROM
- System-on-chip: Qualcomm Snapdragon S3 MSM8260
- CPU: Sensation 1.2 GHz dual-core Qualcomm Scorpion; Sensation XE 1.5 GHz dual-core Qualcomm Scorpion
- GPU: Qualcomm Adreno 220
- Memory: 768 MB RAM
- Storage: 4 GB (1 GB user accessible)
- Removable storage: 8 GB microSD 2.0, (up to 64 GB SDXC)
- Battery: Sensation 1520 mAh internal rechargeable li-ion, removable Sensation XE 1730 mAh
- Rear camera: 8-megapixel (3264×2448) with autofocus and dual LED flash, 1080p HD (only 720p HD on XL) video recording @ 30 frame/s with tap-to-focus and digital zoom (sensor: 1/3.2" Samsung S5K3H1GX)
- Front camera: VGA fixed-focus color camera (0.3-megapixel)
- Display: 4.3 in (110 mm) capacitive S-LCD Gorilla glass touch screen with qHD (540×960) resolution at 256.15 PPI
- Connectivity: 3.5 mm TRRS jack, Bluetooth 3.0 with A2DP, FM stereo receiver (87.5-108 MHz) with RDS, Micro USB 2.0 (5-pin) port with Mobile High-definition Link (MHL) for USB or HDMI connection, Wi-Fi 802.11b/g/n
- Data inputs: A-GPS, ambient light sensor, digital compass, G-sensor, gyroscope, multi-touch capacitive touchscreen, proximity sensor
- Codename: Pyramid
- Other: USB and Wi-Fi tethering, HTC Sense v3.0 user interface (v3.5 on the XL edition)

The HTC Sensation is a smartphone designed and manufactured by HTC Corporation that runs the Android 2.3 Gingerbread software stock. Officially announced by HTC on April 12, 2011, the HTC Sensation was launched by Vodafone in key European markets including the United Kingdom on May 19, 2011 and by T-Mobile in the United States on June 12, 2011 (marketed as the HTC Sensation 4G). It was HTC's fifth flagship Android phone and the first HTC phone to support the HTC Sense 3.0 user interface. At the time of its release, the Sensation XE was the world's fastest Android phone.

== Software ==
The device shipped with Android 2.3.3 and includes HTC Sense 3.0 UI.

HTC launched the Sensation as part of a new generation of devices with signed bootloaders. As a consequence, the phones were originally not rootable, denying users administrative rights to their phones. It was announced on July 10, 2011, that HTC Sensation devices would have their bootloaders unlocked due to overwhelming customer feedback after the release.

On July 29, 2011, a tool named Revolutionary was released by amateur developers AlphaRevX and unrevoked, which enabled S-off, and subsequently, allowed permanent root.

In August 2011, HTC officially allowed unlocking HTC Sensation bootloaders at the HTCdev.com website.

=== Update ===
In March 2012, HTC updated their devices to Android 4.0 Ice Cream Sandwich (ICS). The ICS update re-locked the bootloader, but developers found a procedure that made it possible to obtain S-off.

HTC decided to fork their Sense user interface, leaving Sensation owners who updated to ICS with the Sense 3.6 interface instead of getting Sense 4.0, which launched on newer phones.

The phone can be upgraded with a custom ROM up to Android 7.1.2, but the device is currently considered obsolete and development has ended.

== Variants ==
=== HTC Sensation XE ===
On September 14, 2011, HTC released the Extended Edition (XE) of the HTC Sensation in Europe under the name HTC Sensation XE with Beats Audio. The Sensation XE had a faster 1.5 GHz dual-core processor (up from 1.2 GHz on the stock Sensation), a larger 1730mAh battery, and shipped with Android 2.3.4 (Gingerbread) OS with HTC Sense 3.0. The Sensation XE featured a red speaker, buttons, rear camera, and the Beats logo to differentiate it from older Sensations. It included urbeats earphones, a renamed and redesigned iBeats headphone.

=== HTC Sensation XL ===
On October 6, 2011, HTC released the Sensation XL with a larger 4.7-inch screen running HTC Sense 3.5 with Beats Audio.

== See also ==
- List of Android smartphones
