= HTC One V =

Smartphone released in 2012

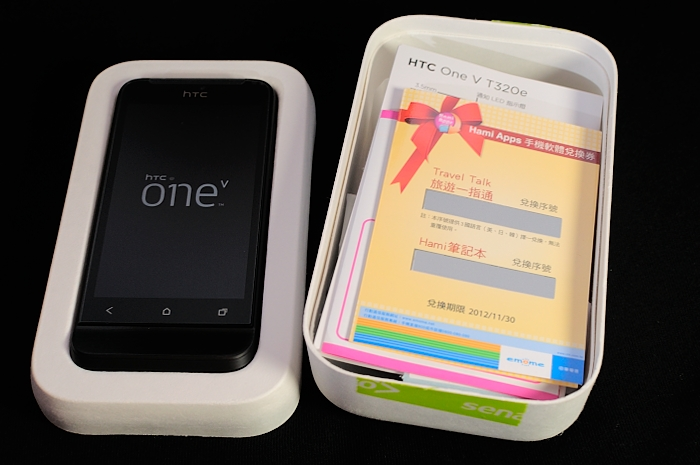
- An image of the HTC One V
- Brand: HTC
- Manufacturer: HTC Corporation
- Type: Smartphone
- Series: HTC One
- Predecessor: HTC Legend
- Related: HTC One X, HTC One S
- Form factor: Slate
- Dimensions: 120.3 mm (4.74 in) H 59.7 mm (2.35 in) W 9.2 mm (0.36 in) D
- Weight: 115 g (4.1 oz)
- Operating system: Android 4.0.3 with HTC Sense 4.0, unofficially upgradeable to Android 4.4 (CDMA) and Android 6.0 (GSM) via custom ROM
- System-on-chip: Qualcomm Snapdragon S255
- CPU: 1 GHz single-core Qualcomm Scorpion
- GPU: Qualcomm Adreno 205
- Memory: 512 MB RAM
- Storage: 4 GB
- Removable storage: microSD up to 32 GB
- Battery: 1500 mAh Li-ion
- Rear camera: 5 MP + autofocus, LED flash
- Front camera: No
- Display: 3.7 in (94 mm) 480×800 pixels, Super IPS LCD2 [252ppi]
- Connectivity: 2G: 850 900 1800 1900 MHz; 3G: 850 900 1900 2100 MHz; HSDPA: 14.4 Mbps; Wi-Fi: 802.11b/g/n; Bluetooth: v4.0 with aptX® enabled
- Data inputs: Multi-touch capacitive touchscreen, proximity sensor, ambient light sensor, 3-axis accelerometer
- Codename: htc-primou
- SAR: 0.87 W/kg
- References: Sim = regular

The HTC One V was a smartphone designed and manufactured by HTC as part of the HTC One series which runs Android 4.0.3 with an HTC Sense 4.0 overlay. This phone was constructed from an aluminum unibody. Its design resembles the HTC Legend released in 2010. It features a 5-megapixel camera, 3.7-inch touchscreen (480×800 resolution), 512 MB RAM, a 1 GHz processor, and Beats audio. Officially announced by HTC on 26 February 2012, the HTC One V was released on 26 April 2012 in the UK.

In December 2012, HTC announced that the One V would not get an upgrade to Android 4.1. Still, in early 2013, independent ROM developers produced several ports of Android 4.1 and Android 4.2 Jelly Bean for the HTC One V, including Shpongle-Evervolv and Paranoid Android.

== Camera ==
The 5 megapixel camera has an aperture of f2.0, a 28 mm lens with a BSI sensor. The camera was capable of autofocus and includes a LED flash, as well as video recording in 720p. Images taken by the camera are processed by HTC's ImageChip, and includes ImageSense, a set of software tools that add functionality to the camera. This added functionality includes the ability to take HDR photos, improves performance in low-light situations, and allows the shooting of slow-motion video.

The One V does not feature a front-mounted camera.

== Reception ==
The HTC One V has received relatively positive reviews from various prominent technology sites. Jamie Keene from The Verge praised the One V's design and durability, but was let down by the low-end specifications. Overall, the smartphone received a fairly positive score of 7.1 out of 10. Mat Smith from Engadget shared similar opinions, but his main criticism was given to the phone's lower-end Qualcomm processor. Nevertheless, he lauded the rest of the device citing it as an inexpensive phone that could handle almost all day to day tasks.

== Availability ==
The HTC One V launched in India on 9 April 2012 with ₹19,999 (US$210) as the suggested retail price. From 10 May it was available for ₹16,800 (US$170) in some online shops.

In Canada, the device was available on Bell Mobility, Telus Mobility, Virgin Mobile and Koodo Mobile.

In the United States, Virgin Mobile USA sold a CDMA variant of this device for $150 contract-free. U.S. Cellular also sold a CDMA version which was available for $129 upon signing a contract. On 5 September 2012, Cricket Wireless MVNO RadioShack No Contract Wireless service began selling the One V, Cricket itself also began selling it a couple of weeks later. Cricket's and RadioShack's One V are both compatible with the Muve Music service.

In Australia, the device was available on the Optus network.

In the United States, GSM versions with custom "Ninja Networks" logos and OS were given out for use as a ticket to the "Ninja Party" with the NinjaTel Van during DEF CON 20 in July 2012.
