= HTC Merge =

Android-based smartphone

- Operating system: Android
- Battery: 1400mAh
- Display: 3.8"

The HTC ADR6325, originally known as the HTC Lexikon and now known as the HTC Merge, is a device created by HTC. It is identified as a flagship phone carried by US Cellular and Alltel Wireless and came to Verizon Wireless and "C Spire Wireless" in the summer of 2011. It features an 800 MHz processor, 3.8" capacitive touchscreen, 5 Mega Pixel camera with LED flash quality and a 720p camera as well as a full QWERTY keyboard and Android 2.2 with the HTC Sense 1.6 User Interface, it also came with an 8 GB card.

The HTC Merge is a Multi-band device supporting both GSM and CDMA2000 cellular communications.

== Design ==
The Merge used a brushed aluminum material and had four touch-sensitive buttons below the screen. It also had a green indicator light on the top of the face.
