= HTC One X9 =

HTC smartphone

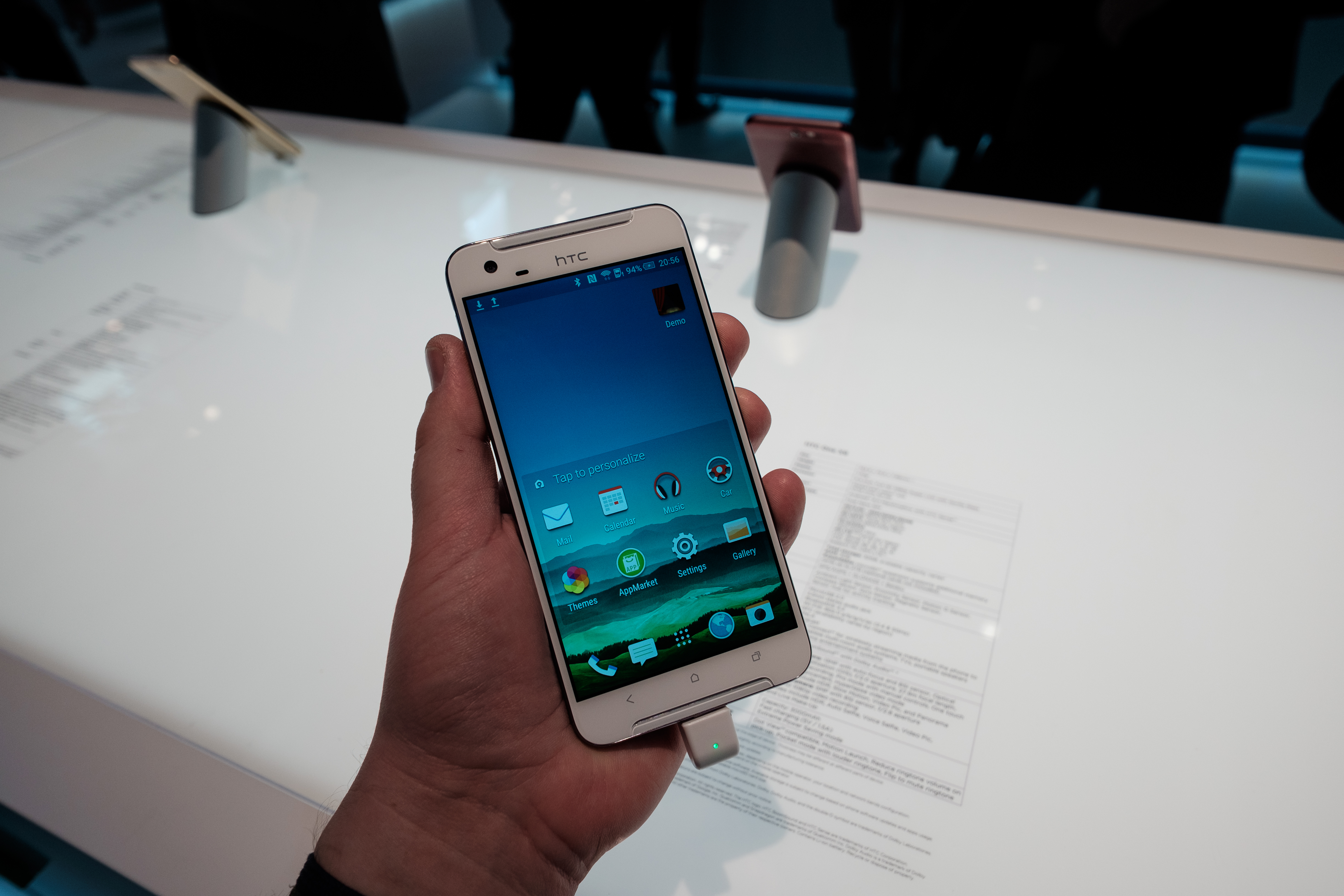
- HTC One X9
- Brand: HTC
- Manufacturer: HTC Corporation
- Type: Smartphone
- Series: HTC One
- Successor: HTC One X10
- Dimensions: 153.9 x 75.9 x 8 mm (6.06 x 2.99 x 0.31 in)
- Weight: 170 g (6.00 oz)
- Operating system: Android 6.0 "Marshmallow"
- System-on-chip: Mediatek MT6795 Helio X10
- CPU: Octa-Core Cortex-A53
- GPU: PowerVR G6200
- Memory: 3 GB
- Storage: 32 GB
- Removable storage: micro SD, up to 200 GB
- Battery: 3,000 Li-Ion mAh
- Rear camera: 13 MP, f/2.0, 28mm, autofocus, OIS, dual-LED (dual tone) flash
- Front camera: 5 MP, f/2.8, 34mm, 1080p@30fps
- Display: 5.5 inch, FHD, Super LCD, 1080 x 1920 16M colors 401 ppi

HTC One X9 is a touchscreen, slate smartphone designed and manufactured by HTC. It was released running Android 6.0, (Marshmallow) with the HTC Sense skin overlay. The One X9 was announced in December 2015 and released in China in January 2016.
