= HTC One VX =

2012 smartphone

- Brand: HTC
- Manufacturer: HTC Corporation
- Type: Smartphone
- Series: HTC One
- Operating system: Android OS, v4.0 (Ice Cream Sandwich)
- System-on-chip: Qualcomm Snapdragon S4 MSM8930
- CPU: 1.2 GHz dual-core Qualcomm Snapdragon S4 (MSM 8930)
- GPU: Adreno 305
- Memory: 1 GB RAM
- Storage: 8GB eMMC
- Removable storage: microSD up to 32 GB
- Battery: Li-Ion 1800 mAh battery
- Rear camera: 5MP, f/2.0, 28mm wide angle lens, smart LED flash, BSI sensor, HTC ImageChip, and 1080p HD video recorder
- Front camera: VGA front-facing camera
- Display: 4.5 inch qHD super LCD 2 (960 x 540) 16M colors 245 ppi
- SAR: 1.23 W/kg

The HTC One VX is an Android smartphone designed and manufactured by HTC. Released on November 16, 2012, by AT&T, it is a mid-range device carrying design traits from the remaining One series devices (such as the One X).

== Inside ==
The One VX is equipped with Google's operating system Android version 4.0, also called Ice Cream Sandwich. Layered on top of the standard Android interface is a graphical shell from HTC called HTC Sense UI. This is already the fourth version of the graphics shell and has been completely redesigned as was actually intended, to make everything look as spacious as possible. The phone also features Beats Audio, a technology that should make sound better.

== See also ==
- HTC One series
