= HTC Desire 510 =

Android smartphone released by HTC in 2014

The HTC Desire 510 is a mid-range Android smartphone released by HTC in 2014.

The phone received mixed reviews. Eugene Kim of PC Magazine noted that despite being the first Android device with a 64-bit processor, the phone "under-delivers on most other fronts". Matt Hanson of TechRadar noted the phone's 4G connectivity and low price, but also that the phone made budget compromises on its internal storage, screen and camera. Andrew Hoyle of CNET was more positive, noting that despite the phone's unimpressive specifications, its price tag was very reasonable because it offered 4G connectivity at a low price.
