= HTC Desire V =

Discontinued Android smartphone

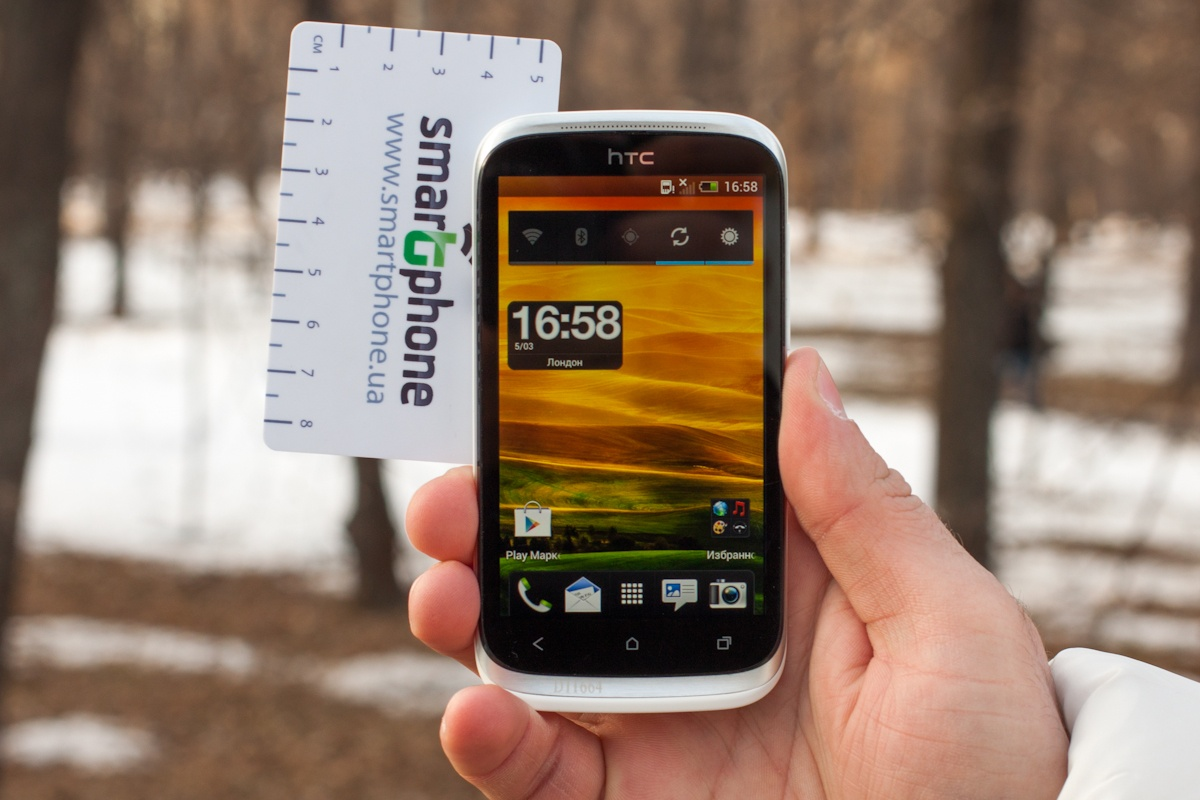
- Manufacturer: HTC Corporation
- Type: Smartphone
- Series: A Series (Android)
- First released: 2012, June
- Predecessor: HTC Desire C
- Successor: HTC Desire 500
- Related: HTC One, Samsung Galaxy S Duos S7562
- Form factor: Slate
- Dimensions: 118.5×62.3×9.3 mm (4.67×2.45×0.37 in)
- Weight: 114 g (4.0 oz)
- Operating system: HTC Sense 4.0a on top of Android 4.0 (Ice Cream Sandwich)
- CPU: Qualcomm Snapdragon MSM7227A 1 GHz Cortex-A5
- GPU: Adreno 200
- Memory: 512 MB RAM
- Storage: 4 GB
- Removable storage: microSD (up to 32GB)
- Battery: Removable 1650 mAh Li-ion
- Rear camera: 5 MP (720p at 30 frames per seconds)
- Front camera: No
- Display: 480×800 pixels LCD 4 in (100 mm), 233 ppi
- Sound: Beats Audio speakers
- Connectivity: 2G: GSM 850 / 900 / 1800 / 1900 MHz; 3G: HSDPA 900 / 2100 - SIM 1 only (SIM1 Only); Wi-Fi: 802.11b/g/n Bluetooth: v4.0 with apt-x enabled 3.5mm headphone jack microUSB 2.0
- Data inputs: Multi-touch capacitive touchscreen, proximity sensor, G-Sensor, Ambient light sensor

The HTC Desire V is an Android ICS-based dual-SIM smartphone manufactured by HTC. It supports tri-band GSM on its secondary slot and quad-band GSM/EDGE + dual-band HSPA on the primary SIM-1 slot. It is available in two color options: Black and White. It has specifications that were considered mid-range by reviewers around the time of release. Reviewers also highlighted the rarity of dual-SIM phones during that time.
