= HTC Jetstream =

Tablet computer made by HTC

- Manufacturer: HTC Corporation
- Type: Tablet, media player
- Generation: Initial Release
- Released: September 2011
- Introductory price: $849.99
- Operating system: Android 3.1 (Honeycomb) with HTC Sense UI
- CPU: 1.5 GHz Qualcomm Snapdragon
- Memory: 1 GB DDR2 RAM
- Storage: Flash memory eMMC: 32 GB
- Display: 10.1 inch 1280x768 px
- Input: Multi-touch capacitive touchscreen display
- Camera: 8.0 megapixel rear-facing 1.3 megapixel, front-facing
- Connectivity: HSDPA 850 / 1900 / 2100 FD-LTE 700 / 1700 AWS; Wi-Fi 802.11b/g/n 2.4/5.0Ghz Bluetooth 3 (with A2DP)
- Power: 7300 mAh Lithium-ion battery / AC
- Dimensions: 251 mm (9.9 in) (h); 178 mm (7.0 in) (w); 13 mm (0.51 in) (d)
- Weight: 709 g (25.0 oz)
- Website: at wireless.att.com

The HTC Jetstream is a 10.1 inch tablet from Taiwanese company HTC, which was earlier rumored as the HTC Puccini. It is also the first 4G LTE tablet from AT&T.

HTC Jetstream has a 1.5 GHz dual core processor and an 8MP camera.
