= Android 4.x =

2011–13 Android mobile operating systems

Android 4 may refer to:

- Android Ice Cream Sandwich (4.0 – 4.0.4)
- Android Jelly Bean (4.1 – 4.3.1)
- Android KitKat (4.4 – 4.4.4)
