= HTC One X =

Android smartphone designed and manufactured by HTC

HTC One X (International)

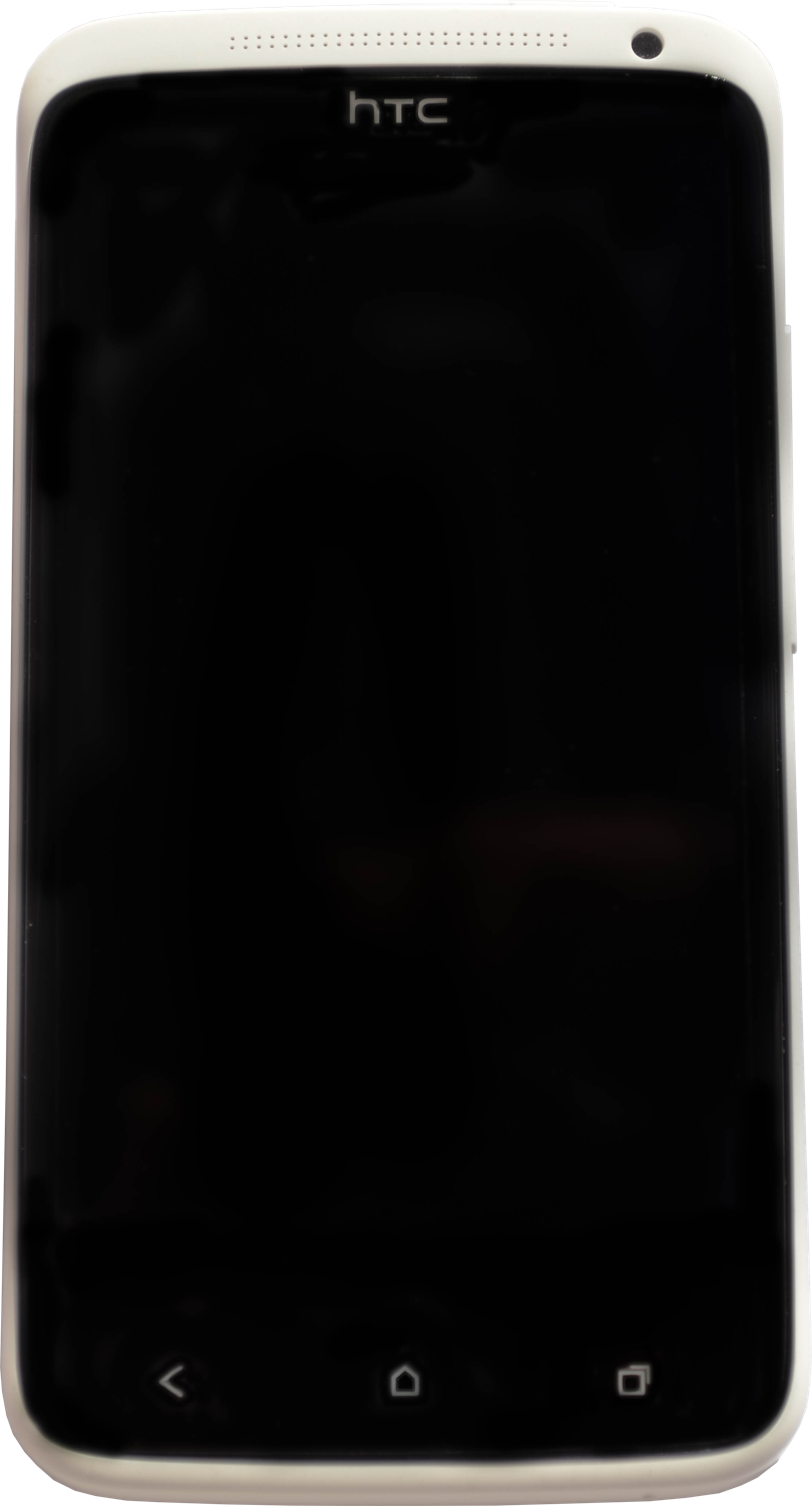
- HTC One X
- Manufacturer: HTC Corporation
- Type: Smartphone
- Series: HTC One
- Availability by region: April 2, 2012: Australia; India; Indonesia; Malaysia; Singapore; Thailand; Philippines; April 5, 2012: United Kingdom; April 20, 2012: Canada; April 26, 2012: New Zealand
- Predecessor: HTC Sensation, HTC Sensation XL
- Successor: HTC One (M7)
- Related: HTC One S, HTC One V, HTC Evo 4G LTE
- Compatible networks: “2G/GSM/GPRS/EDGE” 850 900 1800 1900 mHz “3G/HSPA/WCDMA/HSDPA” 850 / 900 / 1900 / 2100 mHz(tri-band 3G) “4G/LTE” Snapdragon S4 variant only: 700 mHz Class 17/1700/2100
- Form factor: Slate
- Dimensions: 134.36 mm (5.290 in) H 69.9 mm (2.75 in) W 8.9 mm (0.35 in) D
- Weight: 130 g (4.6 oz)
- Operating system: Android 4.0.3 Ice Cream Sandwich with HTC Sense 4 (upgradable to Android 4.2.2 Jelly Bean with HTC Sense 5)
- System-on-chip: Nvidia Tegra 3 T30
- CPU: 1.5 GHz quad-core ARM Cortex-A9 MPCore
- GPU: Nvidia ULP GeForce 520 MHz
- Memory: 1 GB RAM
- Storage: 32(26) GB; 16(10) GB available for user; 2 GB reserved for applications
- Removable storage: None
- SIM: microSIM
- Battery: 1,800 mAh Li-Polymer
- Rear camera: 8-megapixel camera with auto focus, smart LED flash, BSI sensor, F2.0 aperture, 28mm lens, dedicated imaging chip, continuous shooting. 1080p HD video recording, video stabilization, slow motion video capture (768 × 432 pixels).
- Front camera: 1.3-megapixel front camera (720p for recording and video chat)
- Display: 4.7 in (120 mm) Super LCD 2 with RGB matrix 1280×720p pixels (16:9 Aspect ratio) (312 ppi); Corning Gorilla Glass 2.0
- Connectivity: 2G (GSM/GPRS/EDGE): 850/900/1,800/1,900 MHz; 3G (UMTS/HSPA/HSPA+): 850/900/1,900/2,100 MHz; Wi-Fi: 2.4/5.0 GHz, 802.11a/b/g/n NFC with Android Beam; Bluetooth: 4.0 with aptX; DLNA; Wi-Fi Direct; Wi-Fi Hotspot microUSB 2.0 with support for USB OTG
- Codename: Endeavor; EndeavorU
- SAR: 0.68 W/Kg@10g (Head) 0.70 W/Kg@10g (Body)
- Other: accelerometer, gyrometer, digital compass, proximity sensor, ambient light sensor

The HTC One X is a touchscreen-based, slate-sized smartphone designed and manufactured by HTC. It was released running Android 4.0.3, (upgradeable to 4.2.2) with the HTC Sense 4.0 skin (later upgradeable to 5.0). The NVIDIA powers the One X Tegra 3 for most international GSM carriers, making this the first HTC phone to be equipped with a quad-core processor, while a variant which is LTE capable is powered by the Qualcomm Snapdragon S4 dual-core 1.5 GHz Krait processor. The One X was announced on February 26, 2012, at the Mobile World Congress and was HTC's sixth flagship product, leading the HTC One series from the time of its release through April 2013, when its successor the HTC One (M7) was announced.

== Specifications ==
=== Software ===
The One X shipped with the Android 4.0.4 mobile operating system with the HTC Sense 4.0 graphical user interface. The upgrade to Android 4.2.2 with Sense 5 is available for most regions like Asia, Europe, the Middle East, the Americas, and Australia. 25 GB of Dropbox storage is offered free for two years.

Some users have noticed that multitasking does not work on the HTC One X as it does in stock Android 4.0 Ice Cream Sandwich, because the system more aggressively terminates background apps. HTC has explained that they customized Android on the One X so that HTC Sense has priority over background apps when memory is low.

On July 20, 2012, HTC confirmed that the One X, along with the One S, would be receiving a firmware update to Android 4.1 Jelly Bean; however, it did not announce a release schedule for these improvements. The refreshed One X+ comes with Android 4.1 Jelly Bean. By mid-November and early December, the Android 4.1.1 update began rolling out worldwide, bringing many new features and improvements, such as Google Now, Project Butter, which provides a smoother overall UI, and battery optimizations that improve battery life and help quell overheating. On June 20, 2013, a functional Ubuntu Touch build was made available for download. The HTC One X, The 2013 HTC One plus also The HTC Butterfly and the refreshed version of the HTC One X, called the One X+ was promised an update by HTC to the latest version Android 4.2.2 and the new Sense version 5 in the near future and just a few days later on the 19th of August, the update officially began rolling out to the One X, bringing it up to date with the newest sense version, Sense 5 UI, Android version 4.2.2, Quick Toggles and many software improvements found in the 2013 HTC One.

=== Hardware ===
The One X is powered by a NVIDIA Tegra 3 system on a chip with a 1.5 GHz quad-core ARM Cortex-A9 MPCore CPU for most international GSM networks, or a 1.5 GHz dual-core Qualcomm Snapdragon S4 Krait (MSM8960) SoC with an integrated on-die LTE (4G) primarily for North American LTE carriers. It features 1 GB of RAM; a 1,800 mAh battery, a dual-band 802.11n WiFi radio, Bluetooth 4.0 with aptX, GPS, and NFC. It comes with 16 or 32 GB of internal storage but does not feature external storage. The One X also features a standard array of sensors, including a digital compass, a proximity sensor, a gyroscope, an accelerometer, and an ambient light sensor.

The One X has three physical keys: a power button on the top and higher- and lower-volume buttons on the right side. On the front of the One X are three capacitive touch keys for the Back, Home, and Recent Application functions.

On the left side of the One X is a Micro USB 2.0 port. This port doubles as a MHL interface, allowing the One X to output 1080p content to an external display via HDMI with an adapter. A 3.5 mm headphone jack is located on the top of the One X, as is one of the two stereo microphones. The second microphone is located on the bottom. The One X has two speakers: a rear loudspeaker and a speaker above the front display, which serves as the earpiece. The front speaker grill also houses the notification LED, which flashes green for notifications, flashes red for low battery, and illuminates red when the phone is charging.

The rear of the One X has the raised camera dome and the flash for the accompanying camera. In addition, another distinguishing feature of the rear of the One X is the five charging pins or "Pogo Pins". On the AT&T variants of the One X and One X+, AT&T has moved these pins to a different position, making the AT&T models incompatible with the vast majority of accessories that use these charging pins.

==== Display ====
The One X features a 4.7-inch (120 mm) 1,280x720 pixel (RGB matrix) Super LCD 2 display, with a pixel density of 312 pixels per inch, covered by a single pane of Corning Gorilla Glass 2.0.

==== Battery ====
The One X features a 1,800 mAh battery. For the One series, HTC spent thousands of person-hours on a Battery Stamina Boost Project due to general consumer complaints about the notably poor battery life of previous HTC devices. HTC researched "the SoC, networking, display, operating system and preloaded applications" to improve battery life.

==== Audio ====
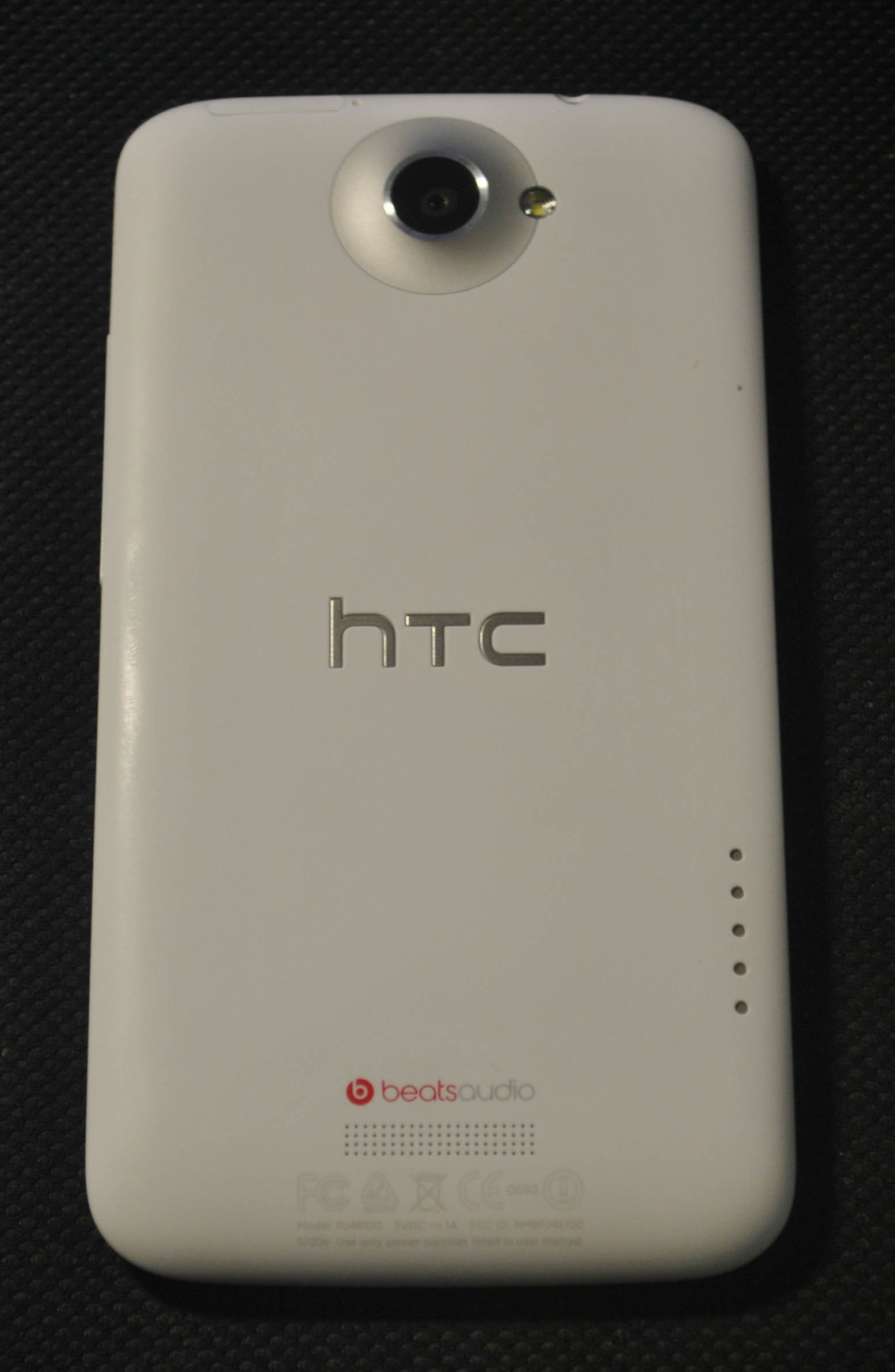
Image of the rear of the HTC One X

The device comes with a Beats Audio equalizer. While the One X typically includes a set of Beats by Dr. Dre headphones, the device only comes with a standard set of white headphones in the UK, Sweden, Germany, Singapore, and Saudi Arabia. In Canada on Rogers and the United States on AT&T, the standard retail packaging does not include a headset. In Australia, the device includes a set of color-matched HTC-branded headphones.

==== Camera ====
The rear-facing camera has an 8-megapixel back-illuminated sensor with a maximum aperture of f/2, autofocus, an LED flash dubbed HTC Smart Flash with three levels of brightness (determined by distance from the subject), and a dedicated imaging chip. With a startup time of 0.7 seconds and 0.2 seconds per shot, it beats even the Samsung Galaxy Nexus in camera speed. The camera can record 1080p video at 24 frames per second and 10 megabit/s in h.264 with the baseline profile, with stereo audio. The flashlight can be toggled during recording. It can take four photos per second while recording video. It also has slow motion video capture and playback (768 × 432 pixels) at an unspecified sensor frame rate. The output video is measured at a third of real-time speed. Shooting modes include High Dynamic Range (HDR) and panorama. The One X does not feature a physical_camera_button.

The front-facing camera has a resolution of 1.3 megapixels. It is capable of 720p, 30 frames per second recording at 5 megabits/s, also in h.264 baseline.

The image processor is HTC's ImageChip, a part used in common with other devices in the HTC One series (2012 models like the HTC One S and One V). According to HTC, ImageChip removes noise, balances color, and extends depth of field. The software is HTC's ImageSense.

== Model variants ==
=== One X (North America) / One XL ===
The HTC One X LTE for North America has been carried by Rogers Wireless in Canada since April 20, 2012 and AT&T Mobility in the United States since May 6, 2012. It is 0.4 mm longer than the international model, and features a 1.5 GHz dual-core Qualcomm Snapdragon S4 (MSM8960) SoC with an integrated on-die LTE (4G) modem instead of the Nvidia Tegra 3 which requires an external modem and is LTE-incompatible, and 16 GB of internal storage instead of 32 GB. AT&T cites incompatibility between Nvidia's Tegra 3 processor and LTE radios currently available on the market as the reason for the difference in processors. Benchmarks have shown the battery life of the Snapdragon S4 variant to be marginally better than the Tegra 3 version for various everyday tasks, except for web browsing where the North American model placed 15-30% better. This is primarily due to a smaller manufacturing process, 28 nm, of the Snapdragon S4 SoC compared to 40 nm for the Nvidia Tegra 3 inside the international HTC One X.

The AT&T version omits many apps, including Voice Recorder, Polaris Office, FM Radio, Flashlight, and Dropbox. It adds many AT&T apps, including AT&T Code scanner, AT&T FamilyMap, AT&T Navigator, AT&T Ready2Go, Device Help, Live TV, and myAT&T.

In markets outside of North America where the Snapdragon S4 (LTE) is sold alongside the Tegra 3 (most international GSM), the Snapdragon S4 variant is branded as the HTC One XL. The device is almost identical to the North American version, using a dual-core Qualcomm Snapdragon S4 MSM8960 SoC with an LTE-capable modem in place of the Nvidia Tegra 3 quad core SoC, but is also available in both 16 GB and 32 GB versions.

The CDMA variant which is known as the Evo 4G LTE, released exclusively for Sprint, features essentially the same hardware as the HTC One X LTE, but adds a MicroSD slot and a kickstand which is popular with users of the HTC Evo 4G (WiMax).

==== United States import ban ====
On 15 May 2012, shipments of both the One X and the Evo 4G LTE were delayed by U.S. Customs by order of the International Trade Commission, to ensure that its software complied with an import ban imposed on HTC involving a patent owned by Apple. The patent covers software that converts phone numbers and email addresses in text into links and presents a menu of possible actions when these links are tapped. On May 21, 2012, the Taipei Times reported that the HTC One X and HTC EVO 4G LTE shipment had cleared US Customs and was entering the United States. To comply with the ruling, the software on North American models will not follow Android's default behavior of offering a menu of apps in these circumstances, instead certain apps are assigned by default and the settings menu contains extra options for changing these associations.

=== One XC ===
The HTC One XC is a Chinese variant of the One X that shares similar specifications with the dual-core LTE version. Its body strongly resembles the Evo 4G LTE, but has a golden band instead of the red kickstand and a golden rim around the rear camera lens.

=== One XT ===
The HTC One XT is another Chinese variant of the One X, exclusive to China Mobile. It is identical to the international quad-core version, but is designed to run on China Mobile's TD-SCDMA network instead of GSM.

=== One X+ ===
The HTC One X+ was unveiled on October 2, 2012. It is a refreshed version of the One X with a new red and grey or white casing, 64 GB of storage, a larger 2100 mAh battery, an updated Nvidia Tegra 3 clocked at 1.7 GHz, support for GLONASS and an improved front camera (1.6 megapixels, f/2.2). It runs on Android 4.1 Jelly Bean with an update to HTC Sense UI named "Sense 4+". The North American version has a Qualcomm MDM9215 modem for LTE usage. Currently, the North American version is exclusive to AT&T in the US and Telus in Canada. It is only available in black, with a white Beats logo on the back and white accents on its buttons instead of red. Although the One X+ on AT&T received the Android 4.2 update, the Telus version never officially received it. It has been announced that the HTC One X+ will not receive further updates, although it did receive a patch for the Heartbleed security vulnerability. The last Android version to run on is Android 4.2.2.

=== Model comparison table ===
Model	One X (International) S720e / G23	One XL X325e / X325s	One X (North America) X325a	One X+ S728e	One X+ (North America)
Codename	HTC Endeavor	HTC Evita		HTC Endeavor C2	HTC Evitare UL
Countries	International	Hong Kong, Australia, Germany, Singapore, United Kingdom	Canada, United States	International	Canada, United States
Carriers	International	Telstra, Vodafone, Deutsche Telekom, O2 Germany, EE	AT&T, Rogers Wireless, Telus	International	AT&T, Telus
2G GSM/GPRS/EDGE	850, 900, 1800, 1900 MHz				
3G UMTS/HSPA+	850, 900, 1900, 2100 MHz		850, 1900, 2100 MHz	850, 900, 1900, 2100 MHz	
4G LTE	No	800, 1800, 2600 MHz	700, 1700, 2100 MHz	No	700, 1700, 2100 MHz
Dimensions	134.36 mm (5.290 in); 69.9 mm (2.75 in); 8.9 mm (0.35 in)	134.8 mm (5.31 in); 69.9 mm (2.75 in); 8.9 mm (0.35 in)		134.4 mm (5.29 in); 69.9 mm (2.75 in); 8.9 mm (0.35 in)	
Weight	130 g (4.6 oz)			135 g (4.8 oz)	
Operating system	Android Jelly Bean 4.2.2 with HTC Sense 5	Android Jelly Bean 4.2.2 with HTC Sense 5	Android Jelly Bean 4.2.2 with HTC Sense 5	Android Jelly Bean 4.2.2 with HTC Sense 5	Android Jelly Bean 4.2.2 with HTC Sense 5
SoC	Nvidia Tegra 3 AP33	Qualcomm Snapdragon S4 MSM8960		Nvidia Tegra 3 AP37	
CPU	1.5 GHz quad-core ARM Cortex-A9 MPCore	1.5 GHz dual-core Qualcomm Krait		1.7 GHz quad-core ARM Cortex-A9 MPCore	
GPU	Nvidia Geforce ULP (520 MHz)	Qualcomm Adreno 225		Nvidia Geforce ULP (520 MHz)	
RAM	1 GB				
Storage	32(26) GB; 16(10) GB available for user 2 GB reserved for applications	16 or 32 GB	16 GB; 12 GB available for user 2 GB reserved for applications	64 or 32 GB, 55 or 26 GB available for user	64 GB; 55 GB available for user
Battery	1,800 mAh			2,100 mAh	

== Reception ==
The HTC One X which features ImageSense and Beats Audio won two awards at the Mobile World Congress held on February 25, 2012, in Barcelona, firstly, the "Best Smartphone of MWC" by Laptop Magazine and secondly, the "Best in Show" award by Tom's Hardware.

The HTC One X received positive reviews from technology review sites. Chris Ziegler of The Verge gave the phone an overall score of 8.4 out of 10, listing the design, display, and camera UI as the best features, while Sense 4.0, image/video quality, and battery life were not better. He writes, "[the] One X isn’t just one of the best Android phones I’ve ever used — it’s one of the best mobile devices I’ve ever used, period." Tech reviewing websites CNET and Engadget have described the HTC One X as "one of the greatest phones of all time."

Brent Rose of Gizmodo writes that "The HTC One X is easily better than the iPhone 4S" and "The screen is most definitely better, there are many more features, and the design is far superior, and the larger screen size is a definite plus", conceding that not to like this device, "you must be insane." Rose went on to say, "By the beard of Zeus, the screen! The 4.7-inch Super LCD2 is simply the best screen on a mobile device. Ever." In a review by The Verge, Chris Ziegler writes that the "One X's display is, without a hint of hyperbole, the best I've ever seen on a phone. Full stop. Seriously, I'm struggling to find fault with it in any way: it's got a near-perfect 180 degree viewing angle and perhaps the most accurate color reproduction and color temperature available". Myriam Joire of Engadget writes, "On the non-PenTile One X, colors seemed more natural and the whites were whiter than on AMOLED devices like the Galaxy Nexus."

As one of the newest and highly anticipated flagship phones running Android 4.0 "Ice Cream Sandwich", and with their LTE-capable versions sharing the same Snapdragon S4 SoC, the HTC One X is frequently compared to the Samsung Galaxy S III. Critics generally regarded the One X's build quality and Super LCD2 screen to be better than the Galaxy SIII plasticky body and AMOLED PenTile display, with some noting that the One X's display may not have the same level of blacks or vibrancy as an AMOLED but having more accurate colour reproduction/temperature with less oversaturation, but the Galaxy SIII had a removable battery and a MicroSD slot that the One X lacked. TechRadar ranked the HTC One X second to the Galaxy S III on their 20 best mobile phones in the world on September 13, 2012. Despite the positive reception, the One X was viewed as commercially unsuccessful and overshadowed by the Galaxy SIII in terms of sales and marketing, as well as the iPhone 4S.

The HTC One X is also frequently compared to the HTC One S, which sits just below it in HTC's 2012 lineup. The LTE-capable One X shares much of its hardware with the One S, including the dual-core Qualcomm Snapdragon S4 MSM8960 SoC. The One X's S-LCD 2 is considered superior to the One S's Super AMOLED Pentile display, and the One X (Snapdragon S4 variant, not the Tegra 3) includes an LTE-capable modem that the One S lacks; however, the One S has better battery life and a form factor that is easier to hold.

The refreshed HTC One X+ has received a positive but mixed reception. Some reviewers noted that it was a stopgap solution, as that the use of a higher-clocked quad-core Nvidia Tegra 3 SoC (with its 40 nm manufacturing process) was less power efficient than the 28 nm Snapdragon S4, and that HTC missed a chance to use the new quad-core Snapdragon S4 Pro which debuted in the Nexus 4 and LG Optimus G and scored significantly higher in GPU tests. The One X+'s 20-30% speed advantage in benchmarks over the regular One X would be decreased once the latter received an update to Android 4.1 "Jellybean". The One X+ offers 64 GB of storage, which offsets a major deficiency on the original LTE-capable One X, which had no MicroSD slot and which only came with 16 GB of storage in Canada and the USA.

== Reported problems ==
- HTC has confirmed that the Wi-Fi connectivity issues of the Tegra 3 version are a hardware problem, and the problem will be resolved in future versions.
- HTC has conceded that it is normal for the phone to reach temperatures of 55 °C (131 °F) when performing CPU- and GPU-intensive activities (such as playing games) for extended periods of time.
- Some users have reported that their devices are stuck in the "airplane mode turning off" state and that their IMEI has disappeared. Others have reported that they cannot power their devices off due to the same problem.
- Some users have also reported screen blanking off issue.
