= HTC Hero =

Smartphone developed by HTC

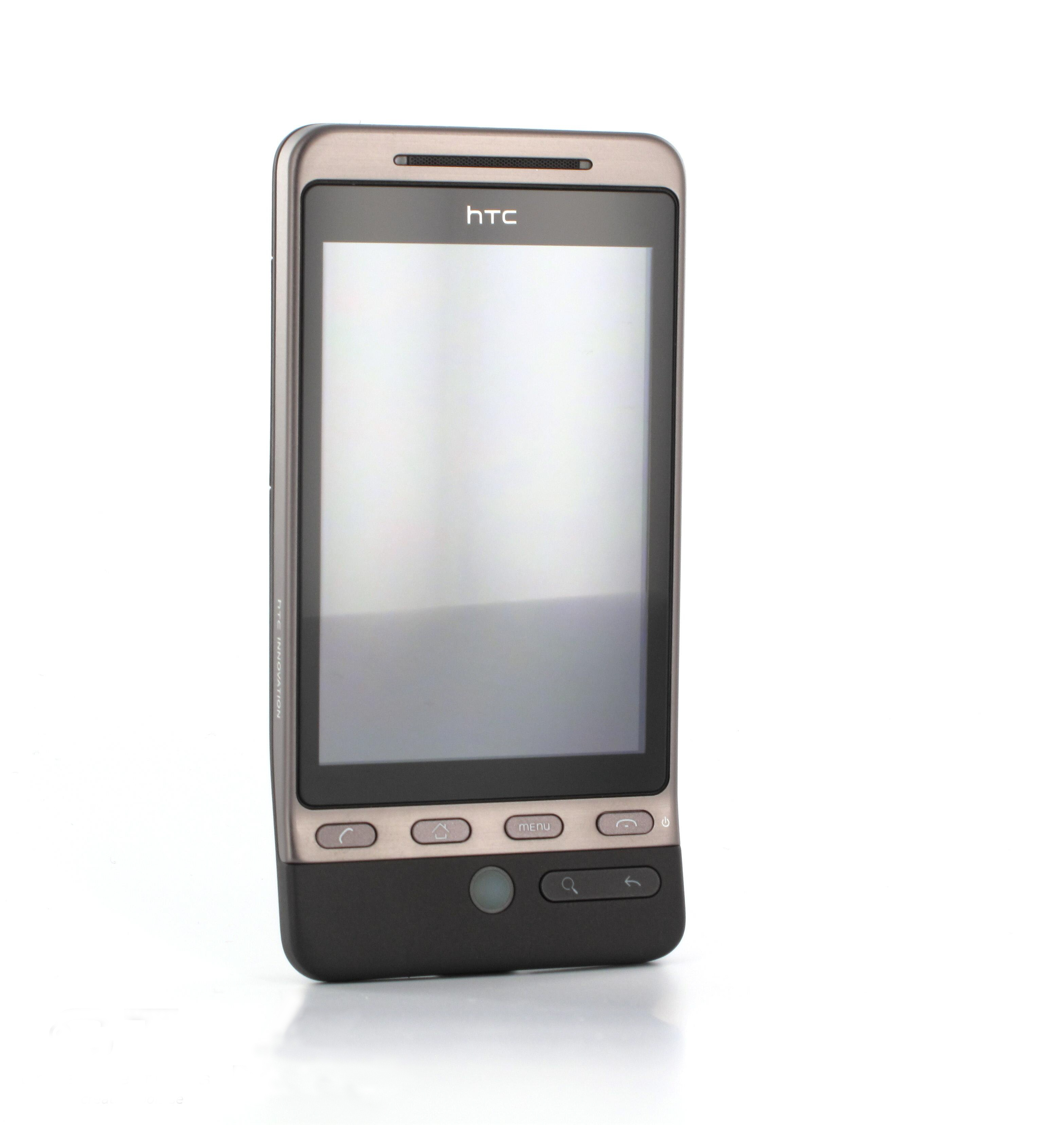
- Manufacturer: HTC
- Type: Smartphone
- First released: Europe July 2009
- Predecessor: HTC Magic
- Successor: HTC Evo Design 4G; HTC Legend; HTC Desire
- Compatible networks: GSM version: quad band GSM 850/900/1800/1900 MHz GPRS/EDGE, and dual band UMTS 900/2100 MHz HSPA (Europe), or dual band UMTS 850/1900 MHz HSPA (North America); CDMA version: dual band CDMA2000/EV-DO Rev. A 800/1900 MHz
- Form factor: Slate
- Dimensions: 112 mm (4.4 in) H 56.2 mm (2.21 in) W 14.35 mm (0.565 in) D
- Weight: 135 g (4.8 oz)
- Operating system: Android 1.5 Cupcake, upgradable to Android 2.1 Eclair with HTC Sense UI
- CPU: 528 MHz Qualcomm MSM7600A or MSM7200A ARM11 processor
- GPU: Adreno 130, OpenGL ES 1.1
- Memory: 288 MB DDR RAM
- Storage: 512 MB, 165 for applications
- Removable storage: microSDHC 2 GB (supports up to 32 GB)
- Battery: GSM version: 3.7 V 1340 mAh; CDMA version: 3.7 V 1500 mAh; Internal rechargeable removable lithium-ion battery
- Rear camera: 5.0 megapixel with autofocus
- Display: 320 × 480 px, 3.2 in (81 mm), HVGA, 65,536 color LCD at 180 pixels per inch (ppi)
- Media: Audio MP3, AAC/AAC+/AAC-LC, AMR-NB, WAV, Ogg Vorbis, MIDI, Windows Media Audio 9 Video MPEG-4, H.263/264, Windows Media Video 9
- Connectivity: Wi-Fi (802.11b/g), Bluetooth 2.0+EDR, ExtUSB
- Data inputs: Multi-touch capacitive touchscreen display, volume controls, ambient light sensors, 3-axis accelerometer, digital compass, A-GPS Specific hardware: Asahi Kasei: AK8973 3-axis magnetic field sensor, AK8973 orientation sensor, Bosch BMA150 3-axis accelerometer; Capella Microsystems: CM3602 proximity sensor, CM3602 light sensor; Google: gravity sensor, linear acceleration sensor, rotation vector sensor
- SAR: Head 1.13 W/kg; Body 0.711 W/kg
- Hearing aid compatibility: Sprint: M3/T3; Droid Eris: M3/T3

HTC Hero (marketed as T-Mobile G2 Touch by T-Mobile in the UK, Austria, Germany, Croatia, the Netherlands, Slovakia, and Hungary; and as Era G2 Touch in Poland) is the third phone manufactured by HTC running the Android platform, announced on June 24, 2009, in London.

It is the second flagship Android phone, and the fourth Android phone after HTC Dream, HTC Magic, and the original Samsung Galaxy. Notably, it is the first phone by HTC to feature a 3.5 mm audio jack, multi-touch ability, the HTC Sense user interface, and a "Lite" version of Adobe Flash.

== Release and availability ==
The device was released in Europe in July 2009; and in the U.S., via Sprint on October 11, 2009, and via Cellular South on November 9, 2009. Hero was the first Android phone released in Russia.

FCC documents surfaced to show that there would be a version of HTC Hero supporting Rogers' and AT&T's 3G bands. One such model version was later released in Canada for Telus's new HSPA+ network. The phone was made available in the UK on Orange, 3, T-Mobile, BT Broadband Anywhere (MVNO), and SIM-free. In Australia, it was available exclusively SIM-free (without a contract) through the Harvey Norman retailer.

== U.S. variants ==
=== U.S. and Canada version (Android 6250) ===
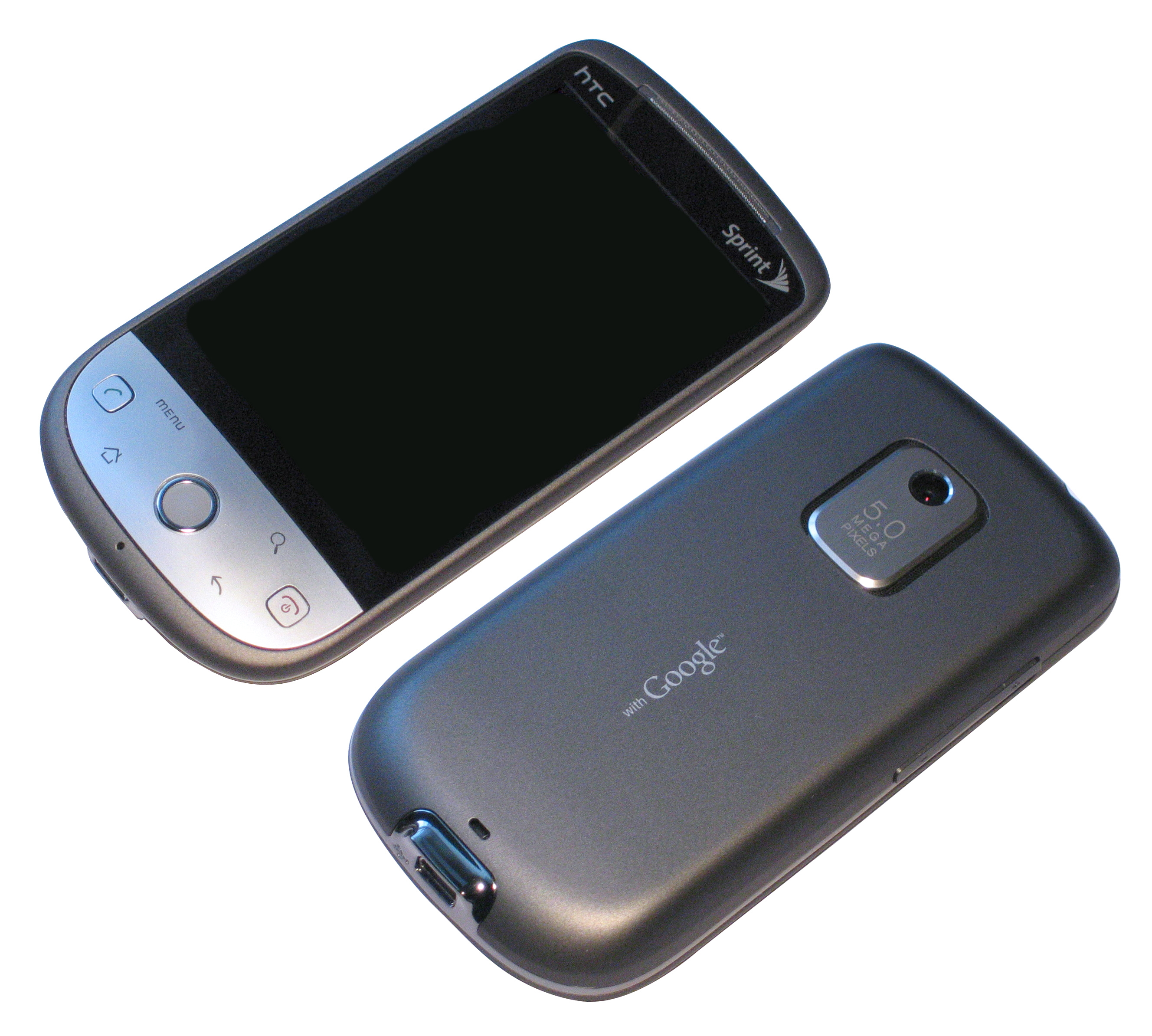
Redesigned HTC Hero for Sprint, available in Canada from Manitoba Telecom Services as the HTC Android 6250 (Hero)

The Sprint, Cellular South, Cellcom, Bluegrass Cellular, Manitoba Telecom Services, NTelos, and Cox Wireless version of the HTC Hero is different from those that are sold in Asia, Canada and Europe. The outer body is significantly altered, with the controversial "chin" that is present on the Asian, Canadian (some providers) and European models being removed in favor of a smooth, beveled surface where all but two of the once raised buttons now lie flat. Also due to performance issues some of the clock animations were removed. Some carriers may market it as the HTC Android 6250.

=== Droid Eris ===
A modified version of the Hero, the HTC Droid Eris, was released on the Verizon Wireless network on November 6, 2009. Pictures of Google's CEO, Eric Schmidt were circulated showing him holding the Droid Eris after a press conference that announced an Android-centric partnership between Verizon and Google. The Verizon Wireless version, unlike the Sprint and GSM versions, features a proximity sensor.

The Eris was succeeded by HTC's Droid Incredible in 2010.

== Updates ==
=== Android 2.1 update development ===
HTC Hero was the first phone to feature HTC's own "Sense" software, which includes a customized user interface. There had been initial issues regarding lag on the device, however a firmware upgrade resolved the problem to some extent.

HTC announced their intent to release an update for the Hero in the first half of 2010 that would upgrade the Android OS to version 2.1 while incorporating Sense. This news was released via Twitter on December 17, 2009. Sprint further clarified on their own Twitter that the 2.1 update would be released early in the second quarter of 2010.

=== Android 2.1 update release and carrier issues ===
By May 14, 2010, Verizon Wireless had made a system update to Android version 2.1 publicly available for their Droid Eris. The Sprint Hero 2.1 update was released on 19 May 2010.

The update to 2.1 was officially released on the HTC website for the Sprint (CDMA) version. On June 4, 2010, the Android 2.1 update for the GSM Hero was made available in Taiwan. On June 17, 2010, the first part of Europe was provided the update, the second part on June 28, 2010. The Worldwide English (WWE) version was released on June 28, 2010. HTC suggested that they would not be updating the device further to version 2.2.

Although the 2.1 update was officially released by HTC, a few networks refused to allow the Hero phones running on their networks to receive the update. Most notably, Orange in Europe did not announce any official update policy or guidance for the phone despite numerous requests from their customer base until late July 2010. This proved to be so frustrating to consumers that a Facebook group was set up to try to gain more information from Orange and their lack of support for the HTC Hero. Nevertheless, on 28 July 2010, part 1 for the 2.1 update was released OTA (over-the-air) to Orange handsets. Three UK released the full 2.1 update OTA on 26 August 2010. The 2.1 update noticeably increased the browser speed and there appears to be an automatic closing of background apps as system resources diminish with increasing multitasking.

Telus had also refused to offer guidance or an update for their HTC Hero. While initially slated for release in May 2010, by mid-August no update had yet been released to Telus customers. Furthermore, customer service at Telus complained that the fault lies with HTC. On the morning of 25 October 2010, Telus officially pushed down the Android 2.1 update to its clients.

=== Android 2.2 Froyo update and beyond ===
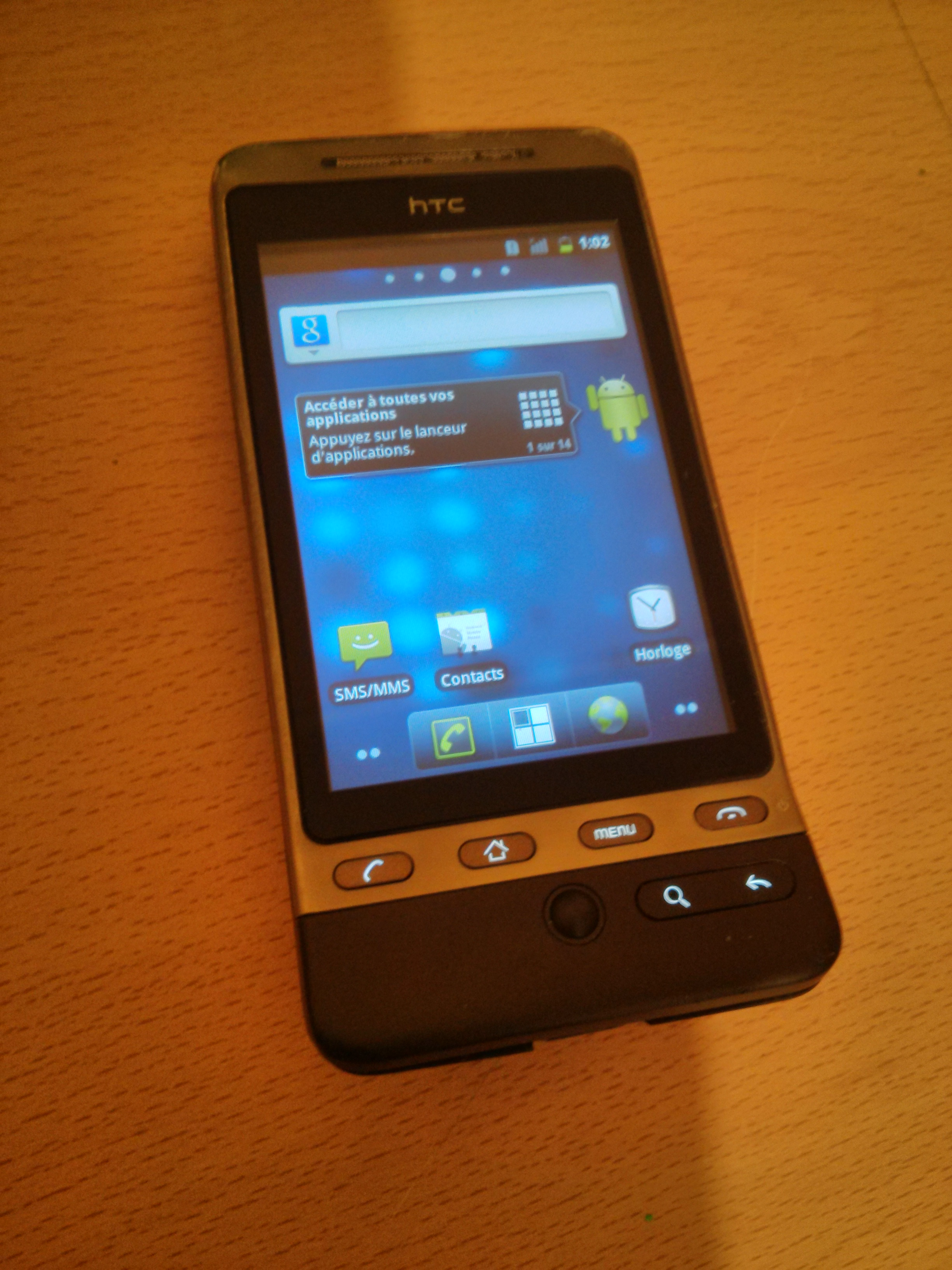
HTC Hero running CyanogenMod 7

Sprint drew the ire of many of its HTC Hero and Samsung Moment customers when it announced in June 2010 that it would be upgrading its Android devices to Android 2.2, but later corrected the statement to say that the upgrade would only be available for the HTC Evo. The criticism had been particularly fierce from those who purchased the Hero on 2-year contracts shortly before and even after Sprint effectively ended the upgrade lifespan of the phone. Widely reported problems with Android 2.1 on the Hero further fueled criticism among customers who felt Sprint had shirked its responsibility to acknowledge and fix confirmed problems with the device.

Separately, numerous groups have created custom ROMs for both the CDMA and GSM versions of the HTC Hero based on various versions of Android 2.1, including the popular VillainROM, CyanogenMod, and others. Although there is not an official version of Android 2.2 for the Hero, several third-party groups have created functioning ROMs which include this. A popular Android 2.2 ROM for the GSM HTC Hero is FroydVillain. Android 2.3 has also been ported to the GSM HTC Hero by the popular aftermarket firmware creation team CyanogenMod. The final stable version 7.2 (based on Android 2.3.7) was released on June 16, 2012, and has been reported as fully operational.

== See also ==
- Galaxy Nexus
