= HTC Desire 600 =

2013 Android-based smartphone by HTC

The HTC Desire 600 is an Android smartphone developed by the Taiwanese manufacturer HTC.

The device is a mid-range dual SIM smartphone carrying traits from the HTC One, such as its use of Sense 5, Beats Audio, and BoomSound front stereo speakers. It uses a 4.5-inch qHD Super LCD 2 display, a 1.2 GHz quad-core Snapdragon 200 processor with 1 GB of RAM, an 8-megapixel camera (lacking the Zoe shooting mode from the One, but still containing the "Highlights" feature), and 64 GB of expandable storage. It was released in Russia, the Middle-East, and Ukraine in June 2013, and is available in India and China. It has replaceable battery and microSD slot with support up to 64 GB.
