= Krait (processor) =

ARM-based CPU

General information
- Launched: 2012
- Designed by: Qualcomm
- Common manufacturer: Qualcomm

Performance
- Max. CPU clock rate: 1 GHz to 2.7 GHz

Physical specifications
- Cores: 2 or 4

Cache
- L1 cache: 16 KiB and 16 KiB
- L2 cache: 1 MiB or 2 MiB

Architecture and classification
- Instruction set: ARMv7-A, Thumb-2

History
- Predecessor: Scorpion
- Successor: Kryo

Qualcomm Krait is an ARM-based central processing unit included in the Snapdragon S4 and earlier models of Snapdragon 400/600/800 series SoCs. It was introduced in 2012 as a successor to the Scorpion CPU and although it has architectural similarities, Krait is not a Cortex-A15 core, but it was designed in-house. In 2015, Krait was superseded by the 64-bit Kryo architecture, introduced in Snapdragon 820 SoC.

== Overview ==
- 11-stage integer pipeline with 3-way decode and 4-way out-of-order speculative issue superscalar execution
- Pipelined VFPv4 and 128-bit wide NEON (SIMD)
- 7 execution ports
- 4 KB + 4 KB direct mapped L0 cache
- 16 KB + 16 KB 4-way set associative L1 cache
- 1 MB (dual-core) or 2 MB (quad-core) 8-way set-associative L2 cache
- Dual- or quad-core configurations
- Performance (DMIPS/MHz):
  - Krait 200: 3.3 (28 nm LP)
  - Krait 300: 3.39 (28 nm LP)
  - Krait 400: 3.39 (28 nm HPm)
  - Krait 450: 3.51 (28 nm HPm)

== See also ==
- Scorpion (CPU)
- Kryo (microarchitecture)
- Comparison of ARMv7-A cores
- List of Qualcomm Snapdragon processors
