= HTC Desire =

2010 smartphone developed by HTC

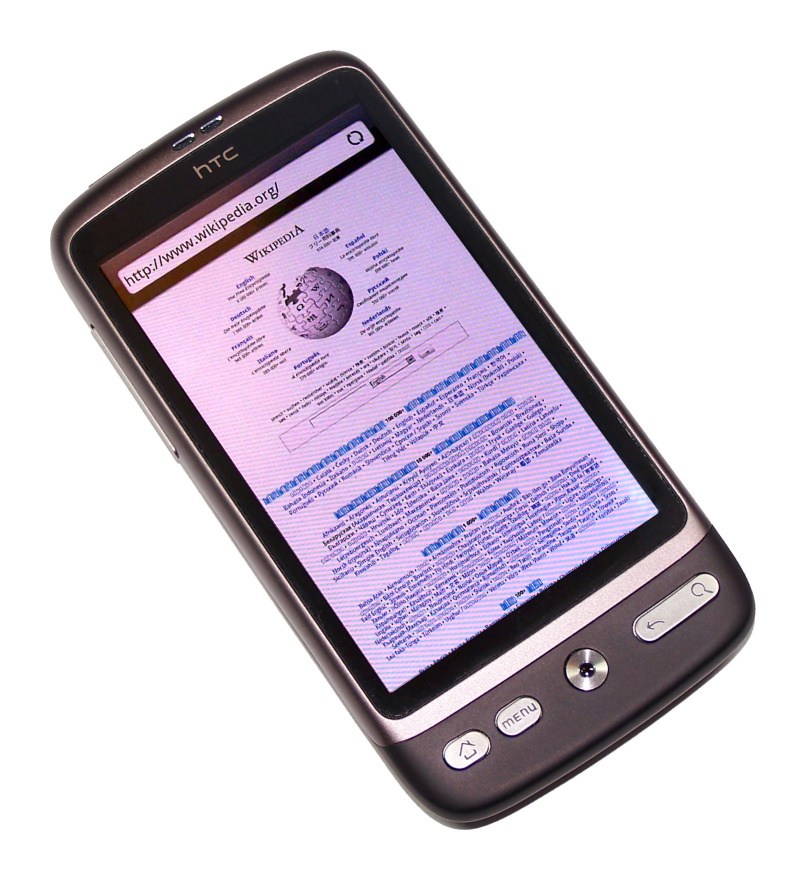
- Manufacturer: HTC Corporation
- Type: Smartphone
- First released: 16 February 2010; 16 years ago
- Availability by region: South Korea May 2010; Australia 2010
- Predecessor: HTC Hero
- Successor: HTC Desire S HTC Desire HD
- Related: HTC Desire Z, HTC Desire HD, HTC Incredible S
- Compatible networks: Europe/Asia Pacific: HSPA/WCDMA; 900/2100 MHz [Model A8181] 850/1900 (Telus Mobility Canada) [Model A8182] 850/2100 MHz (Telstra Australia) [Model A8183] GSM 850/900/1800/1900 MHz
- Form factor: Slate
- Dimensions: 119 mm (4.7 in) H 60 mm (2.4 in) W 11.9 mm (0.47 in) D
- Weight: 135 g (4.8 oz)
- Operating system: Launched with Android 2.1 "Eclair"; Upgradeable to Android 2.3 "Gingerbread" (Though only 2.2 is supported by HTC) or up to Android 6.0 "Marshmallow" via custom ROM
- CPU: 1 GHz Qualcomm QSD8250 Snapdragon
- GPU: Adreno 200
- Memory: 576 MB RAM
- Storage: 512 MB flash (150 MB user accessible)
- Removable storage: microSDHC supports up to 32 GB
- Battery: 1400 mAh; Internal Rechargeable Li-ion; User replaceable
- Rear camera: 5 Megapixel; Autofocus; LED flash face detection, Geotagging
- Display: 3.7-inch 480×800 px (0.38 Megapixels) WVGA AMOLED or Super LCD capacitive touchscreen covered by Gorilla Glass
- Connectivity: Bluetooth 2.1 with EDR; Micro USB; Wi-Fi 802.11b/g
- Data inputs: Dual-Touch screen, 3-axis accelerometer, digital compass, proximity and ambient light sensors, FM Radio, compass, A-GPS
- Codename: Bravo
- Other: HTC Sense 1.9 interface Flash 10.1 enabled (update to Flash 11 available in Android Market)

The HTC Desire (codenamed Bravo) is the first smartphone of the Desire series developed by HTC. It was announced on 16 February 2010 and released in Europe and Australia in the second quarter of the same year. The HTC Desire was HTC's third flagship phone running Android 2.1 Eclair which can be upgraded to 2.2 Froyo or 2.3 Gingerbread. Internally it bears a strong resemblance to the Nexus One, but differs in some features.

== Availability ==
In the United States, the device was available from Alltel, U.S. Cellular, Cellular South, Cox Wireless, nTelos Wireless, Cellcom, and United Wireless in southwest Kansas. In Canada, the device was released by Telus Mobility on 6 August 2010.

In Europe, the carriers were Elisa in Finland, Vodafone UK, Vodafone Ireland, Meteor Irl, BT Broadband Anywhere, T-Mobile UK, O2, Orange UK, 3, and Virgin Mobile UK. In Australia, it was exclusive to Telstra in 2010. In Japan, Softbank Mobile started sales in April. In Turkey, Vodafone started sales in late November 2010.

In South Korea, SK Telecom began sales in May 2010.

In Singapore, the official launch date was 14 May 2010, and the phone was subsequently for sale by all carriers.

In mainland China, HTC launched its four flagship smartphones including the Desire on 27 July 2010. Unlike in other markets, the device was shipped with Android 2.2 ("Froyo").

Many of the UK mobile networks were unable to keep up with demand; Virgin Mobile UK, Vodafone UK, 3, T-Mobile UK and Orange UK experienced very high demand. The disruption caused by the 2010 eruptions of Eyjafjallajökull led to some customers waiting a month getting their HTC Desires due to much of European airspace being closed.

In India, HTC and TATA DOCOMO, the GSM brand of Tata Teleservices Limited, announced a partnership to launch HTC Desire in India on 16 August 2010.

== Hardware ==
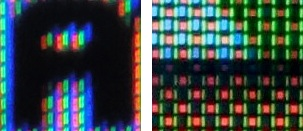
Image of SLCD screen left and AMOLED screen right

The phone uses a 1 GHz ARMv7 "Snapdragon" processor, includes a 5 megapixel auto-focus camera and an optical trackpad, and was among the first consumer devices to feature a large, full-color active-matrix OLED (AMOLED) display.

During late Q2 2010, HTC made the decision to switch the Desire's display to a S-LCD panel, manufactured by the company S-LCD a co-operative between Sony and Samsung. Although this was brought on by a severe AMOLED panel supply shortfall, the new display greatly enhances text readability because of its improved effective resolution, one of the few complaints people had with the original Desire model. Compared to the original AMOLED display, the SLCD display has more accurate colour reproduction, far less susceptibility to burn-in, similar peak brightness and very good viewing angles, but a lower contrast ratio. The new SLCD display was claimed to have similar or better power efficiency compared with the original AMOLED display; however, this has proved to not always be the case because with AMOLED pixels' ability to completely turn off, black or dark pixels use very little power. However, in situations when the screen is predominantly bright (such as when viewing many web pages), the AMOLED display uses more power.

The hardware is capable of high-definition (720p) video recording and playback; the 720p video recording feature has been added to the HTC Desire when updating to the official HTC modified Android Froyo firmware.

== Software ==
The Desire was shipped with Android 2.1. HTC made an update to Android 2.2 (codenamed "Froyo") available on the following dates:

- Europe: 1 August 2010
- SE Asia: 30 August 2010
- India: 1 September 2010
- Japan: 8 October 2010
- US: 8 February 2011

HTC has released a software update to upgrade the Desire to Android 2.3 (Gingerbread). Originally, they planned to do this in June 2011. On 14 June 2011, HTC announced via Facebook that there would be no Gingerbread update for the HTC Desire, citing memory constraints. This is because HTC had been unable to fit both Gingerbread and HTC Sense together in the phone's 250 MB system partition. However, on 15 June, they released a statement saying the Desire would receive the Gingerbread update, with the possibility of some apps being cut. The update was finally released for download from HTC's developer website on 1 August 2011, and is not available as an OTA (over-the-air) update.

== Comparison with Nexus One ==
The Desire internally bears a strong resemblance to the Nexus One. The differences found in the Desire are:

- A different body shell
- An optical trackpad in place of the trackball
- Hardware function buttons instead of touch-sensitive buttons
- FM radio activated (FM radio in Nexus One is disabled by default but can be activated through hacked firmware)
- No second microphone for enhanced noise cancellation
- No dock pin connectors, instead micro-USB is used
- 576 MB DRAM instead of 512 MB DRAM
- Dual band HSPA/WCDMA: 900/2100, 850/2100 or 850/1900 MHz depending on vendor instead of 850/1900/2100 tri-band
- HTC Sense Android skin (not present in the Nexus One)
- All support and updates directly through HTC rather than partially through Google

Because of the strong similarity to the Nexus One "developer phone", the Desire enjoys a highly active third-party developer community. The Desire subforum was one of the most active at xda-developers, and notably CyanogenMod and MIUI are available for the device.

== Reception ==
The HTC Desire received extremely positive reviews. CNET UK reviewed awarded the phone 9.2/10. TechRadar awarded the phone 5 out of 5 stars and stated, "In short, this is a phenomenal phone—one of the best we've ever had."

From TechRadar's "Top 15 best mobile phones in the world", the HTC Desire is simply the best so far: "It's like a Nexus One only better. For this reason, the HTC Desire has entered our top 10 at number 1, and the Google Nexus One has dropped out completely. It's tough at the top." MobileTechWorld found the HTC Desire to be a fairly capable product that "manages to please casual users with HTC’s flashy Sense UI and geeks who love to tweak their handsets on a daily basis thanks to the Google’s Android OS".
