= Scorpion (processor) =

General information
- Launched: 2008
- Designed by: Qualcomm
- Common manufacturer: Qualcomm

Performance
- Max. CPU clock rate: 800 MHz to 1.7 GHz

Cache
- L1 cache: 32 KiB/32 KiB
- L2 cache: 256 KiB or 512 KiB

Architecture and classification
- Instruction set: ARM, Thumb-2

Physical specifications
- Cores: 1 or 2

History
- Successor: Krait

Scorpion is a central processing unit (CPU) core designed by Qualcomm for use in their Snapdragon mobile systems on chips (SoCs). It was released in 2008. It was designed in-house, but has many architectural similarities with the ARM Cortex-A8 and Cortex-A9 CPU cores.

== Overview ==
- 10/12 stage integer pipeline with 2-way decode, 3-way out-of-order speculatively issued superscalar execution
- Pipelined VFPv3 and 128-bit wide NEON (SIMD)
- 3 execution ports
- 32 KB + 32 KB L1 cache
- 256 KB (single-core) or 512 KB (dual-core) L2 cache
- Single or dual-core configuration
- 2.1 DMIPS/MHz
- 65/45/28 nm process

== See also ==
- Krait (CPU)
- List of Qualcomm Snapdragon processors
- Comparison of ARMv7-A cores
- Adreno
