= Comparison of HTC devices =

HTC logo

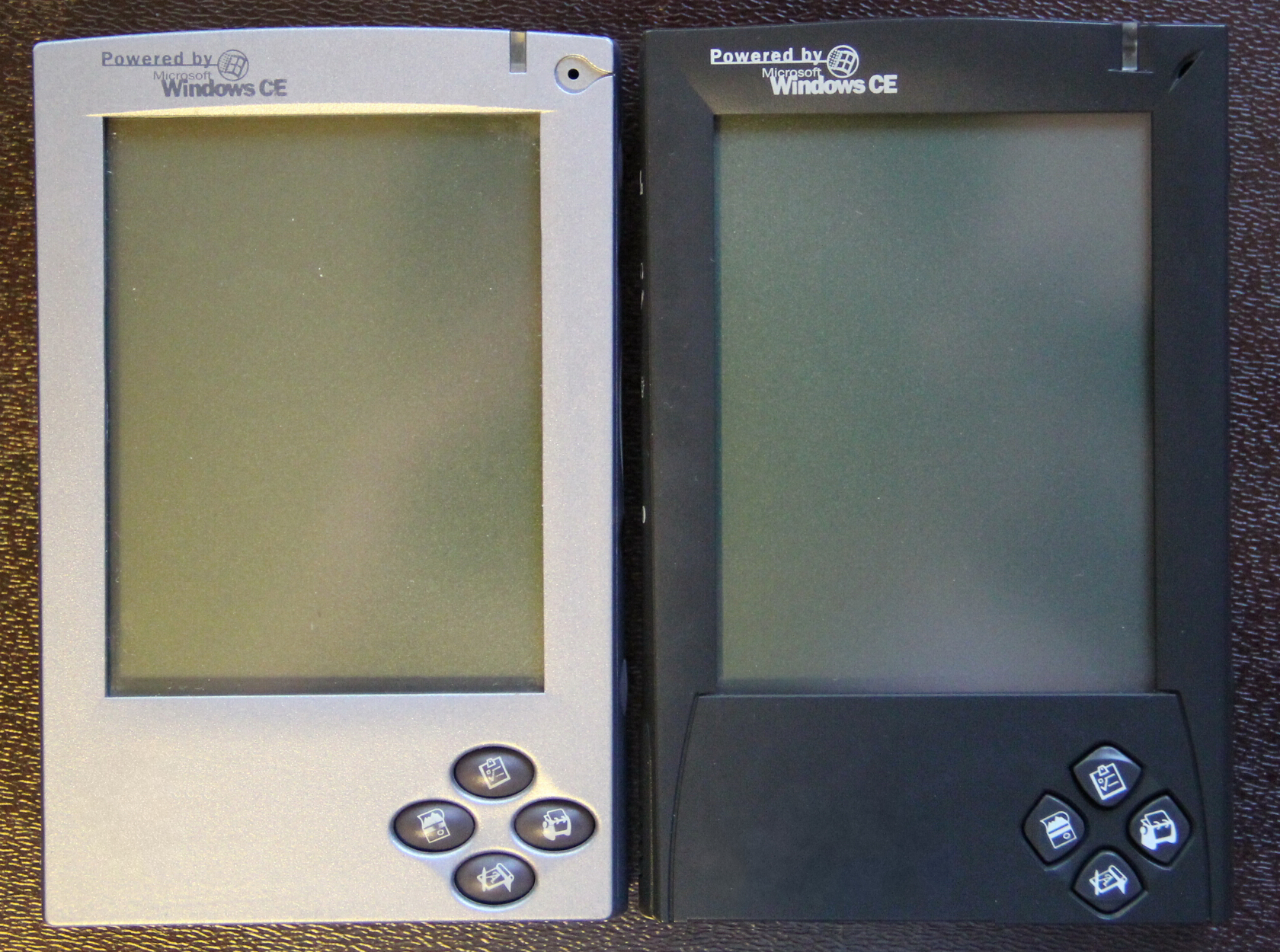
HTC's first product: Kangaroo Palm-size PC

HTC is the original design manufacturer for many Android and Windows Phone-based smartphones and PDAs. Brands that have marketed or previously marketed HTC-manufactured products include Dell, Fujitsu Siemens, HP/Compaq, i-mate, Krome, O_{2}, Palm, Sharp Corporation, and UTStarcom. HTC also manufactures ultra-mobile PCs, and is also the manufacturer of the Nexus One and Nexus 9, a smartphone and tablet designed and branded by Google, respectively.

== Android devices ==
=== Smartphones ===
Code name	Market name	Release	Android version	Sense UI	SoC	Memory (ROM, RAM)	Display	Weight	Battery (mAh)	Thumb keyboard	Wi-Fi	GPS	Camera	Multi–, dual- touch	Network
Dream	A71XX, T-Mobile G1, Era G1	2008-10	1.0, 1.5, 1.6	No	Qualcomm MSM7201A 528 MHz	256 MB, 192 MB	3.2" HVGA	158 g	1150	Yes	Yes	Yes	3.2 MP	dual	GSM
Sapphire	A61XX, HTC Magic, T-Mobile myTouch 3G	2009-02	1.5, 1.6, 2.1	No (Note: Some 32A HTC Sapphires (such as the Rogers HTC Magic in Canada) have been upgraded to Sense UI and more recently to Android 2.1.)	Qualcomm MSM7200A (32A), MSM7201A (32B) 528 MHz	512 MB, 288 MB (32A), 192 MB (32B)	3.2" HVGA	118.5 g	1340	No	Yes	Yes	3.2 MP	dual	GSM
Hero	A62XX, HTC Hero	2009-07	1.5, 2.1	1.0/2.0	Qualcomm MSM7200A 528 MHz	512 MB, 288 MB	3.2" HVGA	135 g	1350	No	Yes	Yes	5 MP	dual	CDMA, GSM
Tattoo	A3232, HTC Tattoo	2009-10	1.6	1.0	Qualcomm MSM7225 528 MHz	512 MB, 256 MB	2.8" QVGA	113 g	1100	No	Yes	Yes	3.2 MP	dual	GSM
DesireC	Droid Eris	2009-11	1.5, 2.1	1.0/2.0	Qualcomm MSM7600 528 MHz	512 MB, 288 MB	3.2" HVGA	120 g	1300	No	Yes	Yes	4.9 MP	dual	CDMA
Bravo	A8181, HTC Desire	2010-04	2.1, 2.2, 2.3	2.0, 3.0	Qualcomm QSD8250 1 GHz	512 MB, 576 MB	3.7" WVGA	135 g	1400	No	Yes	Yes	4.9 MP	dual	GSM
Incredible	Droid Incredible	2010-04	2.1, 2.2, 2.3	2.0, 3.0	Qualcomm QSD8650 1 GHz	512 MB + 7.5 GB, 512 MB	3.7" WVGA	130 g	1300	No	Yes	Yes	8 MP	multi	CDMA
Legend	A6363, HTC Legend	2010-04	2.1, 2.2	2.0	Qualcomm MSM7227 600 MHz	512 MB, 384 MB	3.2" HVGA	126 g	1300	No	Yes	Yes	4.9 MP	dual	GSM
Buzz	A3333, HTC Wildfire	2010-06	2.1, 2.2	2.0	Qualcomm MSM7225 528 MHz	512 MB, 384 MB	3.2" QVGA	118 g	1300	No	Yes	Yes	5 MP	multi	GSM
Espresso	T-Mobile myTouch 3G Slide	2010-06	2.1, 2.2	2.0	Qualcomm MSM7227 600 MHz	512 MB, 512 MB	3.4" HVGA	164.4 g	1300	Yes	Yes	Yes	5 MP	dual	GSM
Liberty	A6366, HTC Aria	2010-06	2.1, 2.2	2.0	Qualcomm MSM7227 600 MHz	512 MB, 384 MB	3.2" HVGA	115 g	1200	No	Yes	Yes	5 MP	multi	GSM
Supersonic	A9292, HTC Evo 4G	2010-06	2.1, 2.2, 2.3	2.0, 3.0	Qualcomm QSD8650 1 GHz	1 GB, 512 MB	4.3" WVGA	170 g	1500	No	Yes	Yes	Rear: 8 MP; Front: 1.3 MP	multi	CDMA, WiMax
Ace	HTC Desire HD	2010-09	2.2, 2.3	2.0, 3.0	Qualcomm QSD8255 1 GHz	1.5 GB, 768 MB	4.3" WVGA	164 g	1230	No	Yes	Yes	8 MP	multi	GSM
Vision	HTC Desire Z, T-Mobile G2	2010-09	2.2, 2.3	2.0, 3.0 (Note: The T-Mobile G2 shipped without HTC's Sense UI.)	Qualcomm MSM7230 800 MHz	1.5 GB, 512 MB	3.7" WVGA	180 g	1300	Yes	Yes	Yes	5 MP	multi	GSM
Glacier	T-Mobile myTouch 4G, HTC Panache	2010-11	2.2, 2.3	2.0, 3.0 (Note: The HTC Glacier shipped with an updated myTouch-themed version of HTC's Sense UI.)	Qualcomm MSM8255 1 GHz	4 GB, 768 MB	3.8" WVGA	153 g	1400	No	Yes	Yes	Rear: 5 MP; Front: 0.3 MP	multi	GSM
Gratia	A6380, HTC Gratia	2010-11	2.2	2.0	Qualcomm MSM7227 600 MHz	512 MB, 384 MB	3.2" HVGA	115 g	1200	No	Yes	Yes	5 MP	multi	GSM
Stallion	HTC Inspire 4G	2010-12	2.2, 2.3	2.0, 3.0	Qualcomm QSD8255 1 GHz	4 GB, 768 MB	4.3" WVGA	164 g	1230	No	Yes	Yes	8 MP	multi	GSM
Mecha	ADR6400, HTC ThunderBolt	2011-01	2.2, 2.3, 4.0	3.6	Qualcomm MSM8655 1 GHz	8 GB, 768 MB	4.3" WVGA	~164 g	1400	No	Yes	Yes	Rear: 8 MP; Front: 1.3 MP	multi	CDMA, LTE
Speedy	HTC Evo Shift 4G	2011-01	2.2, 2.3	2.1, 3.0	Qualcomm MSM7630 800 MHz	2 GB, 512 MB	3.6" WVGA	167 g	1500	Yes	Yes	Yes	5 MP	multi	CDMA, WiMax
Vivo	HTC Incredible S	2011-02	2.2, 2.3, 4.0	2.1, 3.0	Qualcomm QSD8255 1 GHz	1.1 GB, 768 MB	4" WVGA	135 g	1450	No	Yes	Yes	Rear: 8 MP; Front: 1.3 MP	multi	GSM
Marvel	HTC Wildfire S	2011-02	2.3	2.1	Qualcomm MSM7227 600 MHz	512 MB, 512 MB	3.2" HVGA	105 g	1230	No	Yes	Yes	5 MP	multi	GSM
Saga	S510e, HTC Desire S	2011-04	2.3, 4.0	3.0, 3.6	Qualcomm MSM8255 1 GHz	1.1 GB, 768 MB	3.7" WVGA	130 g	1450	No	Yes	Yes	Rear: 5 MP; Front: 0.3 MP	multi	GSM
VivoW	Droid Incredible 2	2011-04	2.2, 2.3	3.0	Qualcomm QSD8655 1 GHz	1.1 GB, 768 MB	4" WVGA	135 g	1450	No	Yes	Yes	Rear: 8 MP; Front: 1.3 MP	multi	CDMA, GSM
Lexikon	ADR6325, HTC Merge	2011-05	2.2, 2.3	1.6/2.1	Qualcomm MSM7630 800 MHz	2 GB, 512 MB	3.8" WVGA	198 g	1400	Yes	Yes	Yes	5 MP	multi	CDMA, GSM
Pyramid	HTC Sensation	2011-05	2.3, 4.0	3.0, 3.6	Qualcomm MSM8260 1.2 GHz, dual-core	1 GB, 768 MB	4.3" qHD	148 g	1520	No	Yes	Yes	Rear: 8 MP; Front: 0.3 MP	multi	GSM
Status	HTC ChaCha	2011-06	2.3	3.0	Qualcomm MSM7227 800 MHz	512 MB, 512 MB	2.6" HVGA	124 g	1250	Yes	Yes	Yes	Rear: 5 MP; Front: 0.3 MP	multi	GSM
Icon	HTC Salsa	2011-06	2.3	3.0	Qualcomm MSM7227 800 MHz	512 MB, 512 MB	3.4" HVGA	120 g	1520	No	Yes	Yes	Rear: 5 MP; Front: 0.3 MP	multi	GSM
Shooter	HTC Evo 3D	2011-06	2.3, 4.0	3.0, 3.6	Qualcomm MSM8660 1.2 GHz, dual-core	4 GB, 1 GB	4.3" qHD (auto- stereoscopic)	170 g	1730	No	Yes	Yes	Rear: dual 5 MP; Front: 1.3 MP	multi	CDMA, WiMax
Doubleshot	T-Mobile myTouch 4G Slide	2011-07	2.3	3.0	Qualcomm MSM8260 1.2 GHz, dual-core	4 GB, 768 MB	3.7" WVGA	184 g	1520	Yes	Yes	Yes	Rear: 8 MP; Front: 0.3 MP	multi	GSM
Rider	HTC Evo 4G+	2011-07	2.3, 4.0	3.0, 3.6	Qualcomm MSM8260 1.2 GHz, dual-core	1 GB, 1 GB	4.3" qHD	160 g	1730	No	Yes	Yes	Rear: 8 MP; Front: 1.3 MP	multi	GSM, WiBro
ShooterU	HTC Evo 3D	2011-07	2.3, 4.0	3.0, 3.6	Qualcomm MSM8260 1.2 GHz, dual-core	1 GB, 1 GB	4.3" qHD (auto- stereoscopic)	170 g	1730	No	Yes	Yes	Rear: dual 5 MP; Front: 1.3 MP	multi	GSM
Holiday	HTC Raider 4G, HTC Vivid 4G, HTC Velocity 4G	2011-09	2.3, 4.0	3.0, 3.6	Qualcomm MSM8660 1.5 GHz, dual-core	16 GB, 1 GB	4.5" qHD	164 g	1620	No	Yes	Yes	Rear: 8 MP; Front: 1.3 MP	multi	GSM
Bliss	HTC Rhyme	2011-09	2.3, 4.0	3.0, 3.6	Qualcomm MSM8255 1 GHz	4 GB, 768 MB	3.7" WVGA	130 g	1600	No	Yes	Yes	Rear: 5 MP; Front: 0.3 MP	multi	GSM
Kingdom	HTC Evo Design 4G, HTC Hero S	2011-10	2.3, 4.0	3.0, 3.6	Qualcomm MSM8655 1.2 GHz	4 GB, 768 MB	4.0" qHD	147 g	1520	No	Yes	Yes	Rear: 5.0 MP; Front: 1.3 MP	multi	CDMA, WiMax, GSM
Ruby	HTC Amaze 4G	2011-10	2.3, 4.0	3.0, 3.6	Qualcomm APQ8060 1.5 GHz, dual-core	16 GB, 1 GB	4.3" qHD	170 g	1730	No	Yes	Yes	Rear: 8 MP; Front: 2 MP	multi	GSM
Pico	HTC Explorer	2011-10	2.3	3.5	Qualcomm MSM7225A 600 MHz	512 MB, 512 MB	3.2" HVGA	108 g	1230	No	Yes	Yes	3 MP	multi	GSM
Pyramid LE	HTC Sensation XE	2011-11	2.3, 4.0	3.0, 3.6	Qualcomm MSM8260 1.5 GHz, dual-core	1 GB, 768 MB	4.3" qHD	151 g	1730	No	Yes	Yes	Rear: 8 MP; Front:0.3 MP	multi	GSM
Runnymede	HTC Sensation XL	2011-11	2.3, 4.0	3.5	Qualcomm MSM8255T 1.5 GHz	16 GB, 768 MB	4.7" WVGA	163 g	1600	No	Yes	Yes	Rear: 8 MP; Front: 1.3 MP	multi	GSM
Vigor	ADR6425, HTC Rezound	2011-11	2.3, 4.0	3.5, 3.6	Qualcomm MSM8660 1.5 GHz	16 GB, 1 GB	4.3" HD	170 g	1620	No	Yes	Yes	Rear: 8 MP; Front: 2 MP	multi	CDMA, LTE, GSM
Endeavor	HTC One X	2012-04	4.0, 4.1	4.0	Nvidia AP33 1.5 GHz, quad-core	16 GB or 32 GB, 1 GB	4.7" HD	130 g	1800	No	Yes	Yes	Rear: 8 MP; Front: 1.3 MP	multi	GSM
Evita	HTC One XL	2012-04	4.0, 4.1	4.0	Qualcomm MSM8960 1.5 GHz, dual-core	16 GB or 32 GB, 1 GB	4.7" HD	129 g	1800	No	Yes	Yes	Rear: 8 MP; Front: 1.3 MP	multi	GSM, LTE
Ville	HTC One S	2012-04	4.0, 4.1	4.0, 4.1	Qualcomm MSM8260A 1.5 GHz, dual-core	16 GB, 1 GB	4.3" qHD	120 g	1650	No	Yes	Yes	Rear: 8 MP; Front: 0.3 MP	multi	GSM
Primo	HTC One V	2012-04	4.0	4.0	Qualcomm MSM8255 1 GHz	4 GB, 512 MB	3.7" WVGA	115 g	1500	No	Yes	Yes	5 MP	multi	GSM
Jewel	HTC Evo 4G LTE	2012-05	4.0, 4.1	4+	Qualcomm MSM8960 1.5 GHz, dual-core	16 GB, 1 GB	4.7" HD	134 g	2000	No	Yes	Yes	Rear: 8 MP; Front: 1.3 MP	multi	CDMA, LTE
ValenteWX	HTC J, ISW13HT	2012-05	4.0	4.0	Qualcomm MSM8260A 1.5 GHz, dual-core	16 GB, 1 GB	4.3" qHD	137 g	1810	No	Yes	Yes	Rear: 8 MP; Front: 1.3 MP	multi	GSM, CDMA, WiMax
Golf	HTC Desire C	2012-06	4.0	4.0a LITE	Qualcomm MSM7225A 600 MHz	4 GB, 512 MB	3.5" HVGA	98 g	1230	No	Yes	Yes	5 MP	multi	GSM
Fireball	Droid Incredible 4G LTE	2012-07	4.0	4.0	Qualcomm MSM8960 1.2 GHz, dual-core	8 GB, 1 GB	4.0" qHD	132 g	1700	No	Yes	Yes	Rear: 8 MP; Front: 1.3 MP	multi	CDMA, LTE
PrimoDS	HTC Desire V	2012-06	4.0	4.0	Qualcomm MSM7227A 1 GHz	4 GB, 512 MB	4.0" HVGA	114 g	1650	No	Yes	Yes	5 MP	multi	GSM
Proto	HTC Desire X	2012-06	4.0, 4.1	4.1	Qualcomm MSM8225 1 GHz, dual-core	4 GB, 768 MB	4.0" WVGA	114 g	1650	No	Yes	Yes	5 MP	multi	GSM
DLXJ	HTC J Butterfly, HTC Droid DNA	2012-12	4.1	4+	Qualcomm APQ8064 1.5 GHz, quad-core	16 GB, 2 GB	5.0" FHD	140 g	2020	No	Yes	Yes	Rear: 8 MP; Front: 2.1 MP (1080p)	multi	GSM, CDMA, LTE
	HTC Desire U	2013-06	4.0	4.0	Qualcomm MSM8225 1.0 GHz, dual-core	4 GB, 512 MB	4.0" WVGA	114 g	1650	No	Yes	No	5 MP	multi	GSM, HSPA
Myst	HTC First	2013-04	4.1	No	Qualcomm MSM8960AA 1.4 GHz, dual-core	16 GB, 1 GB	4.3" HD	123.9 g	2000	No	Yes	Yes	Rear: 5 MP; Front: 1.6 MP	multi	GSM, WCDMA, LTE
M7	HTC One	2013-04	4.1, 4.2, 4.3, 4.4, 5.0.2, 5.1 (Note: The HTC One was also sold as a Google Play edition running stock Android without Sense, which received an update to Android 5.1.)	5.0, 5.5, 6.0	Qualcomm APQ8064T 1.7 GHz, quad-core	32 or 64 GB, 2 GB LPDDR2	4.7" FHD (468 ppi)	143 g	2300 LiPo	No	Yes	Yes	Rear: 4 MP UltraPixel 2.0 μm Front: 2.1 MP (1080p)	multi	GSM, WCDMA, LTE
	HTC First	2013-04	4.1		Qualcomm MSM8930 Snapdragon 400, Dual-core 1.4 GHz	16 GB, 1 GB	4.3" HD (342 ppi)	123.9	2000 LiPo	No	Yes	Yes	Rear: 5 MP Front: 1.6 MP (1080p@30 fps)	multi	GSM, HSPA, LTE
M4	HTC One Mini	2013-08	4.2, 4.3, 4.4	5.0, 5.5	Qualcomm MSM8930AA 1.4 GHz, dual-core	16 GB, 1 GB LPDDR2	4.3" HD (342 ppi)	122 g	1800 LiPo	No	Yes	Yes	Rear: 4 MP UltraPixel 2.0 μm Front: 1.6 MP (720p)	multi	GSM, WCDMA, LTE
T6	HTC One Max	2013-10	4.3, 4.4	5.5, 6.0	Qualcomm APQ8064 1.7 GHz, quad-core	16 or 32 GB, 2 GB LPDDR2	5.9" FHD (367 ppi)	217 g	3300 LiPo	No	Yes	Yes	Rear: 4 MP UltraPixel 2.0 μm Front: 2.1 MP (1080p)	multi	GSM, WCDMA, LTE
M8	HTC One M8	2014-03	4.4, 5.0.1, 5.1, 6.0 (Note: Like the HTC One, the HTC One M8 was also sold as a Google Play edition running stock Android without Sense, which received an update to Android 5.1 and Android 6.0.)	6.0	Qualcomm MSM8974AB 2.26 GHz, quad-core	16 or 32 GB, 2 GB LPDDR3	5.0" FHD (441 ppi)	160 g	2600 LiPo	No	Yes	Yes	Rear: 4 MP UltraPixel 2.0 μm Front: 5.0 MP 2.0 μm	multi	GSM, WCDMA, LTE
M5	HTC One mini 2	2014-05	4.4	6.0	Qualcomm Snapdragon 400 1.2 GHz, quad-core	16 GB, 1 GB LPDDR3	4.5" HD (326 ppi)	137 g	2100 LiPo	No	Yes	Yes	Rear: 13 MP 5.0 μm Front: 5.0 MP	multi	GSM, WCDMA, LTE
htc_a31ul	HTC Desire 620	2014-12	4.4.4	6.0	Qualcomm Snapdragon 410 1.2 GHz, quad-core	8 GB, 1 GB RAM	5.0" HD (294 ppi)	145 g	2100 LiPo	No	Yes	Yes	Rear: 8 MP; Front: 5.0 MP	multi	GSM, WCDMA, LTE
M9	HTC One M9	2015-04	5.0.2, 5.1, 6.0, 7.0	7.0	Qualcomm Snapdragon 810 MSM8994 4x2.0 GHz + 4x1.5 GHz, octa-core	32 GB, 3 GB LPDDR3	5.0" FHD (441 ppi)	157 g	2840 LiPo	No	Yes	Yes	Rear: 20 MP 2.2 μm Front: 5.0 MP 2.0 μm	multi	GSM, WCDMA, LTE
M8s	HTC One M8s	2015-04	5.0	6.0	Qualcomm Snapdragon 615 MSM8939; 4x1.7 GHz + 4x1.0 GHz, octa-core	16 GB, 2 GB	5.0" FHD (441 ppi)	160 g	2900 LiPo	No	Yes	Yes	Rear: 5 MP; Front: 13 MP + 2 MP Duo	multi	GSM, WCDMA, LTE
Aero	HTC One A9	2015-10	6.0, 7.0	7.0	Qualcomm Snapdragon 617 MSM8952; 4x1.5 GHz + 4x1.2 GHz, octa-core	16 GB, 2 GB LPDDR4; 32 GB, 3 GB LPDDR4	5.0" FHD Super AMOLED (441 ppi)	143 g	2150 LiPo	No	Yes	Yes	Rear: 13 MP; Front: 4 MP UltraPixel	multi	GSM, WCDMA, LTE
M10	HTC 10	2016-05	6.0.1, 7.0, 8.0	8.0	Qualcomm Snapdragon 820 MSM8996; 2x2.15 GHz + 2x1.6 GHz, quad-core	32 GB, 4 GB LPDDR4	5.2" QHD Super LCD5	161 g	3000 Li-Ion	No	Yes	Yes	Rear: 12 MP; Front: 5 MP	multi	GSM, CDMA, HSPA, LTE
U-1u	HTC U Ultra	2017-02	7.0, 8.0	8.0	Qualcomm Snapdragon 821 MSM8996; 2x2.15 GHz + 2x1.6 GHz, quad-core	64 GB, 4 GB LPDDR4; 128 GB, 4 GB LPDDR4	5.7" inch, Quad HD (2560 × 1440 pixels) with Dual Display (513 ppi)	170 g	3000 Li-Ion	No	Yes	Yes	Rear: 12 MP (UltraPixel 2 1.55 μm); Front: 16 MP, UltraPixel	multi	GSM, CDMA, HSPA, LTE
Alpine	HTC U Play	2017-01	6.0	8.0	Mediatek MT6755 Helio P10 (4x2.0 GHz Cortex-A53 & 4x1.1 GHz Cortex-A53), Octa-core	32 GB, 3 GB LPDDR4; 64 GB, 4 GB LPDDR4	5.2 inch, FHD 1080p (1080 × 1920 pixels) (428 ppi)	145 g	2500 Li-Ion	No	Yes	Yes	Rear: 16 MP 1 μm Front: 16 MP, UltraPixel 1 μm	multi	GSM, CDMA, HSPA, LTE
U11	HTC U11	2017-06	7.1, 8.0, 9.0	9.0	Qualcomm Snapdragon 835 MSM8998, Octa-core (4 x 2,45 GHz & 4 x 1,9 GHz)	64 or 128 GB, 4 or 6 GB LPDDR4X RAM	5.5" Super LCD5 (1440 x 2560) (534 ppi)	168 g	3000 Li-Ion	No	Yes	Yes	Rear: 12 MP (f/1,7, 4K, 1.4 μm pixel) Front: 16 MP (f/2.0)	multi	GSM, CDMA, HSPA, LTE
U11+	HTC U11+	2017-11	8.0, 9.0	9.0	Qualcomm Snapdragon 835 MSM8998, Octa-core (4 x 2,45 GHz & 4 x 1,9 GHz)	64 or 128 GB, 4 or 6 GB LPDDR4X RAM	6.0" Super LCD6 (1440 x 2880) (538 ppi)	188 g	3930 Li-Ion	No	Yes	Yes	Rear: 12 MP (f/1,7, 4K, 1.4 μm pixel) Front: 8 MP (f/2.0)	multi	GSM, CDMA, HSPA, LTE
U12+	HTC U12+	2018-06	8.0, 9.0	10.0	Qualcomm Snapdragon 845 SDM845, Octa-core (4 x 2,8 GHz & 4 x 1,8 GHz)	64 GB or 128 GB, 6 GB LPDDR4X RAM	6.0" Super LCD6 (1440 x 2880) (538 ppi)	188 g	3500 Li-Ion	No	Yes	Yes	Rear :12 MP UltraPixel 4 (ƒ/1.75, 4K, 1.4 μm) + 16 MP (ƒ/2.6) Front : 8 MP (1.12 μm, ƒ/2.0) + 8 MP (1.12 μm, ƒ/2.0)	multi	GSM, GPRS, EDGE, UMTS, LTE
U12 Life	HTC U12 Life	2018-10	8.1	10.0	Qualcomm Snapdragon 636 SDM636, Octa-core Kryo 260 (up to 1,8 GHz)	64 GB or 128 GB, 4 GB LPDDR4X RAM	6.0" Super LCD (1080 x 2160) (402 ppi)	175 g	3600 Li-Ion	No	Yes	Yes	Rear : 16 MP (ƒ/2.0, 4K) + 5 MP Front : 13 MP (ƒ/2.0, FHD)	multi	GSM, GPRS, EDGE, UMTS, LTE
2Q7A100	HTC U19e	2019-06	9	10.10	Qualcomm Snapdragon 710 SDM710, Octa-core (2 x 2,2 GHz & 6 x 1,7 GHz)	128 GB, 6 GB LPDDR4X RAM	6.0" OLED (1080 x 2160) (402 ppi)	180 g	3930 Li-Ion	No	Yes	Yes	Rear :12 MP (ƒ/1.8, 4K) + 20 MP (ƒ/2.6) Front : 24 MP (ƒ/2.0) + 2 MP (ƒ/2.2)	multi	GSM, GPRS, EDGE, UMTS, LTE
	HTC Desire 20 Pro	2020-07	10		Qualcomm Snapdragon 665 SM6125, Octa-core (4 x 2,0 GHz & 4 x 1,8 GHz)	128 GB, 6 GB LPDDR4X RAM	6.5" IPS LCD (1080 x 2340) (396 ppi)	201 g	5000 Li-Po	No	Yes	Yes	Rear :48 MP (ƒ/1.8, 4K, 0.8 μm) + 8 MP (ƒ/2.2, 1.12 μm) + 2 MP (ƒ/2.4) + 2 MP (ƒ/2.4) Front : 25 MP (ƒ/2.0)	multi	GSM, GPRS, EDGE, UMTS, LTE
	HTC U20 5G	2020-10	10		Qualcomm Snapdragon 765G SM7250, Octa-core (1 x 2,4 GHz & 1 x 2,2 GHz & 6 x 1,8 GHz)	128 GB, 6 GB or 8 GB LPDDR4X RAM	6.8" IPS LCD (1080 x 2400) (387 ppi)	215,5 g	5000 Li-Po	No	Yes	Yes	Rear :48 MP (ƒ/1.8, 4K, 0.8 μm) + 8 MP (ƒ/2.2, 1.12 μm) + 2 MP (ƒ/2.4) + 2 MP (ƒ/2.4) Front : 32 MP (0.8 μm, ƒ/2.0)	multi	GSM, GPRS, EDGE, UMTS, LTE, 5G
	HTC Desire 20+	2020-10	10		Qualcomm Snapdragon 720G SM7125, Octa-core (2 x 2,3 GHz & 6 x 1,8 GHz)	128 GB, 6 GB LPDDR4X RAM	6.5" IPS LCD (720 x 1600) (270 ppi)	203 g	5000 Li-Po	No	Yes	Yes	Rear :48 MP (ƒ/1.8, 4K, 0.8 μm) + 5 MP (ƒ/2.2) + 2 MP (ƒ/2.4) + 5 MP (ƒ/2.4) Front : 16 MP (ƒ/2.0)	multi	GSM, GPRS, EDGE, UMTS, LTE
	HTC Desire 21 Pro 5G	2021-01	10		Qualcomm Snapdragon 690 SM6350, Octa-core (2 x 2,0 GHz & 6 x 1,7 GHz)	128 GB, 8 GB LPDDR4X RAM	6.7" IPS LCD (1080 x 2400) (393 ppi)	205 g	5000 Li-Po	No	Yes	Yes	Rear :48 MP (ƒ/1.8, 4K, 0.8 μm) + 8 MP (ƒ/2.2) + 2 MP (ƒ/2.4) + 5 MP (ƒ/2.4) Front : 16 MP	multi	GSM, GPRS, EDGE, UMTS, LTE, 5G

HTC 10 evo (also known as bolt) needs to be added to the above figure reference is here: https://www.htc.com/us/smartphones/htc-bolt/buy/

=== Tablets ===
Code name	Market name	Release	Android version	Sense UI	SoC	Memory (ROM, RAM)	Display	Weight	Battery (mAh)	Thumb keyboard	Wi-Fi	GPS	Camera	Multi–, dual- touch	Network
Flyer	HTC Flyer; HTC Evo View 4G	2011-05	2.3.3, 3.2.1	3.0	Qualcomm MSM8255 1.5 GHz	32 GB, 1 GB	7" WSVGA	410 g	4000	No	Yes	Yes	Rear: 5 MP; Front: 2 MP	multi	GSM, WCDMA

== 7 Series (Windows Phone 7) ==
Code name	Market name	Release	Operating system	Microprocessor	Memory (ROM, RAM)	Display	Weight	Battery (mAh)	Thumb keyboard	Wi-Fi	GPS	Camera	Multi–, dual-touch	Network	Image
Mozart	HTC 7 Mozart	2010-10	Windows Phone 7	Qualcomm QSD8250 1024 MHz	512 MB, 576 MB	94-millimetre (3.7 in) SLCD	130 g	1300	No	Yes	Yes	8 MP	multi	GSM, WCDMA	
Schubert	HTC HD7	2010-10	Windows Phone 7	Qualcomm QSD8250 1024 MHz	512 MB, 576 MB	109.2-millimetre (4.30 in) SLCD	162 g	1230	No	Yes	Yes	5 MP	multi	GSM, WCDMA	
Gold	HTC 7 Pro; HTC Arrive	2010-10	Windows Phone 7	Qualcomm QSD8250 1024 MHz	512 MB, 576 MB	91.4-millimetre (3.60 in) SLCD	185 g	1500	Yes	Yes	Yes	5 MP	multi	GSM, WCDMA, CDMA	
Spark	HTC 7 Trophy	2010-10	Windows Phone 7	Qualcomm QSD8250 1024 MHz	512 MB, 576 MB	96.5-millimetre (3.80 in) SLCD	140 g	1300	No	Yes	Yes	5 MP	multi	GSM, WCDMA, CDMA	
Mondrian	HTC 7 Surround	2010-10	Windows Phone 7	Qualcomm QSD8250 1024 MHz	512 MB, 576 MB	96.5-millimetre (3.80 in) SLCD	165 g	1230	No	Yes	Yes	5 MP	multi	GSM, WCDMA	
Radar	HTC Radar	2011-09	Windows Phone 7.5	Qualcomm MSM8255 1024 MHz	512 MB, 576 MB	96.5-millimetre (3.80 in) SLCD	160 g	1520	No	Yes	Yes	5 MP	multi	GSM, WCDMA, CDMA	
Eternity	HTC Titan	2011-09	Windows Phone 7.5	Qualcomm MSM8255T 1536 MHz	512 MB, 576 MB	119.4-millimetre (4.70 in) SLCD	160 g	1600	No	Yes	Yes	8 MP	multi	GSM, WCDMA, CDMA	
Radiant	HTC Titan II; HTC Titan 4G	2012-01	Windows Phone 7.8	Qualcomm MSM8255T 1536 MHz	512 MB, 16 GB	119.4-millimetre (4.70 in) SLCD	173 g	1730	No	Yes	Yes	16 MP	multi	GSM, WCDMA, LTE	

== 8 Series (Windows Phone 8) ==
Code name	Market name	Release	Operating system	Microprocessor	Memory (ROM, RAM)	Display	Weight	Battery (mAh)	Thumb keyboard	Wi-Fi	GPS	Camera	Multi–, dual-touch	Network	Image
Accord	HTC Windows Phone 8X	2012-11	Windows Phone 8	Qualcomm MSM8960 1.5 GHz	16 GB, 1 GB	109.2-millimetre (4.30 in) SLCD2	130 g	1800	No	Yes	Yes	8 MP	multi	GSM, CDMA, LTE	
Rio	HTC Windows Phone 8S	2012-11	Windows Phone 8	Qualcomm MSM8227 1 GHz	4 GB, 512 MB	101.6-millimetre (4.00 in) SLCD	113 g	1700	No	Yes	Yes	5 MP	multi	GSM	

== Brew MP phones ==
Code name	Market name	Release date	Operating system	Sense UI	Microprocessor	Memory (ROM, RAM)	Display	Weight	Battery (mAh)	Thumb keyboard	Wi-Fi	GPS	Camera	Image
Rome	Smart	2010-03	Brew MP	Yes	Qualcomm 300 MHz	256 MB, 256 MB	2.8" QVGA	108 g	1100	No	No	No	3.1 MP	
Freestyle	Freestyle	2011-02	Brew MP 1.0.2	Yes	Qualcomm MSM7225 528 MHz	256 MB, 256 MB	3.2" HVGA	128 g	1300	No	No	Yes	3.15 MP	

== S Series (Windows Mobile) ==
Code name	Market name	Release date	Operating system	Microprocessor	Memory (ROM, RAM)	Display	Weight	Battery (mAh)	Keypad	Thumb keyboard	Wi-Fi	GPS	Camera	Image
Canary	SPV 100	2002-10	SmartPhone 2002	TI OMAP710 133 MHz	24 MB, 16 MB	2.2" QCIF	120 g	1000	Yes	No	No	No	Detachable 0.3 MP	
Tanager	–	2003-04	SmartPhone 2002	TI OMAP5910 120 MHz	32 MB, 16 MB	2.2" QCIF	127 g	1000	Yes	No	No	No	Detachable 0.3 MP	
Voyager	–	2004-01	Windows Mobile 2003	TI OMAP710 133 MHz	64 MB, 32 MB	2.2" QCIF	130 g	1100	Yes	No	No	No	0.3 MP	
Typhoon	SPV C500	2004-08	Windows Mobile 2003SE	TI OMAP730 200 MHz	64 MB, 32 MB	2.2" QCIF	103 g	1050	Yes	No	No	No	0.3 MP	
Feeler	8020, SP3i, SDA, Xphone II	2004-11	Windows Mobile 2003SE	TI OMAP730 200 MHz	64 MB, 32 MB	2.2" QCIF	102 g	1050	Yes	No	No	No	0.3 MP	
Sonata	–	2004-11	Windows Mobile 2003SE	TI OMAP730 200 MHz	64 MB, 32 MB	2.2" QCIF	102 g	1050	Yes	No	No	No	0.3 MP	
HTC Amadeus	–	2004-12	Windows Mobile 2003SE	TI OMAP730 200 MHz	64 MB, 32 MB	2.2" QCIF	107 g	1050	Yes	No	No	No	0.3 MP	
Hurricane	–	2005-07	Windows Mobile 2003SE	TI OMAP750 200 MHz	64 MB, 64 MB	2.2" QVGA	107 g	1150	Yes	No	No	No	1.3 MP	
Tornado	–	2005-10	Windows Mobile 5	TI OMAP850 195 MHz	64 MB, 64 MB	2.2" QVGA	106 g	1150	Yes	No	Yes	No	1.3 MP	
Faraday	–	2005-11	Windows Mobile 5	TI OMAP850 195 MHz	64 MB, 64 MB	2.2" QVGA	105 g	1100	Yes	No	No	No	1.3 MP	
Douton	–	2005-12	Windows Mobile 2003SE	TI OMAP730 220 MHz	64 MB, 64 MB	2.2" QVGA	107 g	1150	Yes	No	No	No	1.3 MP	
Startrek	S410, S411	2006-05	Windows Mobile 5	TI OMAP850 195 MHz	128 MB, 64 MB	2.2" QVGA	99 g	750	Yes	No	No	No	1.3 MP	
Breeze	S350, MTeoR	2006-07	Windows Mobile 5	Samsung SC32442 300 MHz	128 MB, 64 MB	2.2" QVGA	115 g	1200	Yes	No	No	No	1.3 MP	
Oxygen	S310	2006-09	Windows Mobile 5	TI OMAP850 201 MHz	64 MB, 64 MB	2.0" QCIF	105 g	1150	Yes	No	No	No	1.3 MP	
Monet	S320	2006-10	Windows Mobile 5	TI OMAP750 201 MHz	128 MB, 64 MB	2.2" QVGA	140 g	1150	Yes	No	No	No	1.3 MP	
Excalibur	S620, S621	2006-10	Windows Mobile 5 (S620) / 6 (S621)	TI OMAP850 201 MHz	128 MB, 64 MB	2.4" QVGA	130 g	960	No	Yes	Yes	No	1.3 MP	
Vox	S710, S711	2007-04	Windows Mobile 6	TI OMAP850 201 MHz	128 MB, 64 MB	2.4" QVGA	140 g	1050	Yes	Yes	Yes	No	2.0 MP	
Libra	S720	2007-06	Windows Mobile 6	Qualcomm MSM7500 400 MHz	128 MB, 64 MB	2.4" QVGA	133 g	1050	Yes	Yes	No	No	2.0 MP	
Cavalier	S630, S631	2007-07	Windows Mobile 6	Samsung SC32442 400 MHz	128 MB, 64 MB	2.4" QVGA	120 g	1050	No	Yes	Yes	No	2.0 MP	
Iris	S640	2007-11	Windows Mobile 6	Qualcomm MSM7500 400 MHz	256 MB, 128 MB	2.8" QVGA	112 g	1200	No	Yes	Yes	No	2.0 MP	
Phoebus	–	2007-11	Windows Mobile 6	TI OMAP850 201 MHz	256 MB, 128 MB	2.6" QVGA	150 g	920	Yes	No	Yes	No	2.0 MP	
Wings	S730	2007-12	Windows Mobile 6	Qualcomm MSM7200 400 MHz	256 MB, 64 MB	2.4" QVGA	150 g	1050	Yes	Yes	Yes	No	2.0 MP	
Rose	S740	2008-09	Windows Mobile 6.1	Qualcomm MSM7225, 528 MHz	256 MB, 256 MB	2.4" QVGA	140 g	1000	Yes	Yes	Yes	Yes	3.2 MP	
Converse	–	2008-03	Windows Mobile 6.1	TI OMAPV1030 260 MHz	256 MB, 128 MB	2.6" QVGA	150 g	1100	Yes	No	Yes	No	2.0 MP	
Willow	S510, S511, Snap	2009-06	Windows Mobile 6.1	Qualcomm MSM7625 528 MHz	256 MB, 192 MB	2.4" QVGA	120 g	1500	No	Yes	Yes	Yes	2.0 MP	
Maple	S521, S522, Snap	2009-06	Windows Mobile 6.1	Qualcomm MSM7225 528 MHz	256 MB, 192 MB	2.4" QVGA	120 g	1500	No	Yes	Yes	Yes	2.0 MP	
Cedar	Ozone	2009-06	Windows Mobile 6.1	Qualcomm MSM7625 528 MHz	256 MB, 192 MB	2.4" QVGA	115 g	1500	No	Yes	Yes	Yes	1.9 MP	

== T Series (Windows Mobile with Touch) ==
Code name	Market name	Release	Operating system	HTC UI	Microprocessor	Memory (ROM, RAM)	Display	Weight	Battery (mAh)	Thumb keyboard	Wi-Fi	GPS	Camera	Image
Raphael	T727X, Touch Pro	2008-07	Windows Mobile 6.1	TouchFLO 3D	Qualcomm MSM7201A 528 MHz	512 MB, 288 MB	2.8" VGA	165 g	1340	Yes	Yes	Yes	3.2 MP	
Opal	T222X, Touch Viva	2008-10	Windows Mobile 6.1	TouchFLO 2D	TI OMAP850 201 MHz	256 MB, 128 MB	2.8" QVGA	110 g	1100	No	Yes	No	2.0 MP	
Jade	T323X, Touch 3G	2008-10	Windows Mobile 6.1	TouchFLO 2D	Qualcomm MSM7225 528 MHz	256 MB, 192 MB	2.8" QVGA	96 g	1100	No	Yes	Yes	3.2 MP	
Herman	T727X, Touch Pro	2008-11	Windows Mobile 6.1	TouchFLO 3D	Qualcomm MSM7200A/MSM7501A 528 MHz	512 MB, 192/288 MB	2.8" VGA	150 g	1340	Yes	Yes	Yes	3.1 MP	
Blackstone	T828X, Touch HD	2008-11	Windows Mobile 6.1	TouchFLO 3D	Qualcomm MSM7201A 528 MHz	512 MB, 288 MB	3.8" WVGA	146 g	1350	No	Yes	Yes	5.0 MP	
Quartz	T829X, Max 4G	2008-11	Windows Mobile 6.1	TouchFLO 3D	Qualcomm ESM7206A 528 MHz	256 MB, 288 MB	3.8" WVGA	151 g	1500	No	Yes	Yes	3.2 MP	
Iolite	T424X, Touch Cruise	2009-01	Windows Mobile 6.1	TouchFLO 2D	Qualcomm MSM7225 528 MHz	512 MB, 256 MB	2.8" QVGA	103 g	1100	No	Yes	Yes	3.2 MP	
Topaz	T5353, Touch Diamond2	2009-04	Windows Mobile 6.5	TouchFLO 3D 2.0	Qualcomm MSM7200A 528 MHz	512 MB, 288 MB	3.2" WVGA	117.5 g	1100	No	Yes	Yes	5.0 MP	
Rhodium	T737X, Touch Pro2	2009-05	Windows Mobile 6.5	TouchFLO 3D 2.0	Qualcomm MSM7200A 528 MHz	512 MB, 288 MB	3.6" WVGA	179 g	1500	Yes	Yes	Yes	3.2 MP	
Tungsten	T738X, Touch Pro2	2009-08	Windows Mobile 6.5	TouchFLO 3D 2.0, HTC Sense	Qualcomm MSM7600 528 MHz	512 MB, 288 MB	3.6" WVGA	188 g	1500	Yes	Yes	Yes	3.2 MP	
Citrine	Pure	2009-08	Windows Mobile 6.5	TouchFLO 3D 2.0	Qualcomm MSM7201A 528 MHz	512 MB, 288 MB	3.2" WVGA	117.5 g	1100	No	Yes	Yes	5.0 MP	
Barium	T7377, Tilt 2	2009-10	Windows Mobile 6.5	TouchFLO 3D 2.0, HTC Sense	Qualcomm MSM7201A 528 MHz	512 MB, 288 MB	3.6" WVGA	178 g	1500	Yes	Yes	Yes	3.2 MP	
Leo	T8585, HD2	2009-10	Windows Mobile 6.5	HTC Sense	Qualcomm QSD8250 1024 MHz	512 MB, 448 MB	4.3" WVGA	157 g	1230	No	Yes	Yes	5.0 MP	
Mega	T3333, Touch2	2009-10	Windows Mobile 6.5	TouchFLO 2D 2.0	Qualcomm MSM7225 528 MHz	512 MB, 256 MB	2.8" QVGA	110 g	1100	No	Yes	Yes	3.2 MP	
Whitestone	Imagio	2009-10	Windows Mobile 6.5	TouchFLO 3D 2.0, HTC Sense	Qualcomm MSM7600 528 MHz	512 MB, 288 MB	3.6" WVGA	150 g	1500	No	Yes	Yes	4.9 MP	
Qilin	T8388	2009-12	Windows Mobile 6.5	TouchFLO 3D 2.0	TI OMAP3430 600 MHz	512 MB, 384 MB	3.6" WVGA	145 g	1500	No	Yes	Yes	4.9 MP	
Tachi	T5399	2009-12	Windows Mobile 6.5	TouchFLO 3D 2.0	Qualcomm MSM7501A 528 MHz	512 MB, 288 MB	2.8" VGA	162 g	1350	No	Yes	Yes	3.1 MP	
Photon	T555X, HD Mini	2010-04	Windows Mobile 6.5.3	HTC Sense	Qualcomm MSM7227 600 MHz	512 MB, 256 MB	3.2" HVGA		1300	No	Yes	Yes	4.9 MP	

== P Series (PDA phones) ==
Code name	Market name	Release	Operating system	HTC UI	Microprocessor	Memory (ROM, RAM)	Display	Weight	Battery	Thumb keyboard	Wi-Fi	GPS	Camera	Image
Wallaby	–	2002-04	Pocket PC 2002	No	Intel StrongARM 206 MHz	32 MB, 32 MB	3.5" QVGA	201 g	1500	No	No	No	No	
Falcon	–	2003-11	Windows Mobile 2003	No	Intel PXA255 400 MHz	32 MB, 64 MB	3.5" QVGA	176 g	1500	No	No	No	No	
Himalaya	–	2004-01	Windows Mobile 2003	No	Intel PXA263 400 MHz	64 MB, 128 MB	3.5" QVGA	185 g	1200	No	No	No	0.3 MP	
Blue Angel	9090	2004-10	Windows Mobile 2003SE	No	Intel PXA263 400 MHz	96 MB, 128 MB	3.5" QVGA	210 g	1490	Yes	Yes	No	0.3 MP	
Harrier	–	2004-11	Windows Mobile 2003SE	No	Intel PXA263 400 MHz	64 MB, 128 MB	3.5" QVGA	208 g	1490	Yes	No	No	0.3 MP	
Magician	–	2004-12	Windows Mobile 2003SE	No	Intel PXA270 416 MHz	128 MB, 64 MB	2.8" QVGA	155 g	1200	No	No	No	1.2 MP	
Alpine	–	2005-05	Windows Mobile 2003SE	No	Intel PXA272 520 MHz	128 MB, 128 MB	3.5" QVGA	190 g	1300	No	Yes	No	1.2 MP	
Gemini	–	2005-05	Windows Mobile 2003SE	No	Intel PXA263 400 MHz	64 MB, 128 MB	3.5" QVGA	212 g	1490	Yes	Yes	No	0.3 MP	
Apache	–	2005-10	Windows Mobile 5	No	Intel PXA270 416 MHz	128 MB, 64 MB	2.8" QVGA	186 g	1350	Yes	Yes	No	1.3 MP	
Galaxy	–	2005-12	Windows Mobile 5	No	Samsung SC32442 300 MHz	128 MB, 64 MB	2.8" QVGA	126 g	1100	No	Yes	Yes	No	
Wizard	P4300	2005-10	Windows Mobile 5	No	TI OMAP850 195 MHz	128 MB, 64 MB	2.8" QVGA	168 g	1250	Yes	Yes	No	1.3 MP	
Prophet	–	2006-02	Windows Mobile 5	No	TI OMAP850 195 MHz	128 MB, 64 MB	2.8" QVGA	148 g	1200	No	Yes	No	2.0 MP	
Charmer	–	2006-03	Windows Mobile 5	No	TI OMAP850 195 MHz	128 MB, 64 MB	2.8" QVGA	150 g	1200	No	No	No	1.3 MP	
Hermes	P4500, TyTN	2006-06	Windows Mobile 5	No	Samsung SC32442 400 MHz	128 MB, 64 MB	2.8" QVGA	176 g	1350	Yes	Yes	No	2.0 MP	
Trinity	P3600, P3600i	2006-09	Windows Mobile 5	No	Samsung SC32442 400 MHz	128 MB, 64 MB	2.8" QVGA	150 g	1500	No	Yes	Yes	2.1 MP	
Artemis	P3300, P3301	2006-10	Windows Mobile 5	No	TI OMAP850 201 MHz	128 MB, 64 MB	2.8" QVGA	130 g	1250	No	Yes	Yes	2.0 MP	
Herald	P4350	2006-12	Windows Mobile 5	No	TI OMAP850 201 MHz	128 MB, 64 MB	2.8" QVGA	168 g	1130	Yes	Yes	No	2.0 MP	
Census	P6000	2007-01	Windows Mobile 5	No	Marvell PXA270 416 MHz	256 MB, 128 MB	3.5" QVGA	350 g	3000	No	Yes	No	2.0 MP	
Love	P3340, P3350	2007-03	Windows Mobile 5	No	TI OMAP850 201 MHz	128 MB, 64 MB	2.8" QVGA	127 g	1200	No	Yes	No	2.0 MP	
Gene	P3400, P3400i	2007-03	Windows Mobile 5	No	TI OMAP850 201 MHz	128 MB, 64 MB	2.8" QVGA	126 g	1250	No	No	No	2.0 MP	
Panda	P6300	2007-05	Windows Mobile 5	No	Samsung SC32442 400 MHz	256 MB, 128 MB	3.5" QVGA	200 g	1500	No	Yes	No	2.0 MP	
Atlas	P4351	2007-05	Windows Mobile 6	No	TI OMAP850 201 MHz	128 MB, 64 MB	2.8" QVGA	168 g	1130	Yes	Yes	No	2.0 MP	
Elf	P3450, Touch	2007-06	Windows Mobile 6	TouchFLO	TI OMAP850 201 MHz	128 MB, 64 MB	2.6" QVGA	112 g	1100	No	Yes	No	2.0 MP	
Titan	P4000	2007-06	Windows Mobile 5/6	No	Qualcomm MSM7500 400 MHz	256 MB, 64 MB	2.8" QVGA	150 g	1500	Yes	Yes	Yes	2.0 MP	
Vogue	P3050, Touch	2007-07	Windows Mobile 6	TouchFLO	Qualcomm MSM7500 400 MHz	128 MB, 64 MB	2.8" QVGA	112 g	1100	No	Yes	Yes	2.0 MP	
Wave	P3000	2007-08	Windows Mobile 6	No	Samsung SC32442 300 MHz	128 MB, 64 MB	2.8" QVGA	130 g	1250	No	No	No	2.0 MP	
Kaiser	P4550, TyTN II	2007-09	Windows Mobile 6	HTC Home	Qualcomm MSM7200 400 MHz	256 MB, 128 MB	2.8" QVGA	190 g	1350	Yes	Yes	Yes	3.0 MP	
Nike	P5500, P5520, Touch Dual	2007-10	Windows Mobile 6	TouchFLO	Qualcomm MSM7200 400 MHz	256 MB, 128 MB	2.6" QVGA	120 g	1120	Keypad	No	No	2.0 MP	
Elfin	P3452, Touch	2007-11	Windows Mobile 6	TouchFLO	TI OMAP850 201 MHz	256 MB, 128 MB	2.6" QVGA	112 g	1100	No	Yes	No	2.0 MP	
Sedna	P6500	2007-11	Windows Mobile 6	HTC Home	Qualcomm MSM7200 400 MHz	256 MB, 128 MB	3.5" QVGA	220 g	1500	No	Yes	Yes	3.0 MP	
Polaris	P3650, P3651, Touch Cruise	2008-01	Windows Mobile 6	TouchFLO	Qualcomm MSM7200 400 MHz	256 MB, 128 MB	2.8" QVGA	130 g	1350	No	Yes	Yes	3.0 MP	
Neon	P5510, P5530, Touch Dual	2008-01	Windows Mobile 6	TouchFLO	Qualcomm MSM7200 400 MHz	256 MB, 128 MB	2.6" QVGA	120 g	1120	Keypad	Yes	No	2.0 MP	
Pharos	P3470	2008-02	Windows Mobile 6.1	HTC Home	TI OMAP850 201 MHz	256 MB, 128 MB	2.8" QVGA	122 g	1100	No	No	Yes	2.0 MP	
Diamond	P3490, P3700, P3701, Touch Diamond	2008-05	Windows Mobile 6.1	TouchFLO 3D	Qualcomm MSM7201A/MSM7500A 528 MHz	256 MB, 192 MB	2.8" VGA	110 g	900	No	Yes	Yes	3.2 MP	
Fuwa	P3100	2008-06	Windows Mobile 6.1	TouchFLO	Samsung SC32442 500 MHz	256 MB, 128 MB	2.8" QVGA	137 g		No	No	Yes	1.9 MP	
Victor	P3051, P3702, Touch Diamond	2008-06	Windows Mobile 6.1	TouchFLO 3D	Qualcomm MSM7201A/MSM7501A 528 MHz	256 MB, 192-288 MB	2.8" VGA	110 g	900	No	Yes	Yes	3.2 MP	
Imagio	P3051, P3702, Touch Diamond	2009-10	Windows Mobile 6.5	TouchFLO 3D	Qualcomm MSM7600 528 MHz	512 MB, 192-288 MB	3.6" VGA	150 g	1500	No	Yes	Yes	5.0 MP	

== X Series (Mobile computer, Subnote) ==
Code name	Market name	Release	Operating system	Microprocessor	Memory (ROM, RAM)	Display	Weight	Battery	Thumb keyboard	Wi-Fi	GPS	Camera	Image
Universal	–	2005-09	Windows Mobile 5	Intel PXA270 520 MHz	128 MB, 64 MB	3.6" VGA	285 g	1620	Yes	Yes	No	1.3 MP	
Athena	X7500, X7501, X7510, Advantage	2007-03	Windows Mobile 5 (X7500)/6 (X7501)/6.1 (X7510)	Marvell PXA270 624 MHz	256 MB, 128 MB	5" VGA	360 g	2100	Yes, detachable	Yes	Yes	3.0 MP, 0.3 MP	
Clio	X9500, Shift	2007-10	Windows Vista Business, SnapVUE	Intel A110 800 MHz	128 MB, 1 GB+64 MB	7" WVGA	800 g	2700	Yes	Yes	Yes	3.0 MP	

== Contracted devices ==
These devices were created under contract for a single non-carrier manufacturer and not branded by HTC, any carriers, or any other manufacturer. For this reason, none of them feature any custom HTC UI.

Code name	Market name	Release	Operating system	Microprocessor	Memory (ROM, RAM)	Display	Weight	Battery	Thumb keyboard	Wi-Fi	GPS	Camera	Image
Rosella	Compaq iPAQ H38xx	2002-02	Pocket PC 2002 Premium	Intel SA-1110 206 MHz	32 MB, 64 MB	3.8" QVGA	190 g	1400	No	No	No	No	
Kiwi	HP iPAQ H19xx	2002-12	Pocket PC 2002 Professional / Windows Mobile 2003	Intel PXA250 200 MHz / Samsung S3C2410 203/266 MHz	16/32 MB, 64 MB	3.5" QVGA	124 g	900	No	No	No	No	
Great Wall	HP iPAQ H221x	2003-06	Windows Mobile 2003	Intel PXA255 400 MHz	32 MB, 64 MB	3.5" QVGA	144.2 g	900	No	No	No	No	
Dextrous	HP iPAQ H435x	2003-10	Windows Mobile 2003	Intel PXA255 400 MHz	32 MB, 64 MB	3.5" QVGA	165 g	1560	Yes	Yes	No	No	
Roadster	HP iPAQ hx470x	2004-07	Windows Mobile 2003SE	Intel PXA270 624 MHz	128 MB, 64 MB	4" VGA	186.7 g	1800	No	Yes	No	No	
Bali	Fujitsu-Siemens Pocket LOOX 7xx	2004-09	Windows Mobile 2003SE	Intel PXA272 416/520 MHz	64 MB, 64/128 MB	3.5" QVGA	175 g	1640	No	Yes	No	1.3 MP	
Beetles	HP iPAQ hw651x	2005-10	Windows Mobile 2003SE	Intel PXA272 312 MHz	64 MB, 64 MB	3" 240×240	165 g	1200	Yes	No	Yes	No	
Sable	HP iPAQ hw69xx	2006-04	Windows Mobile 5	Intel PXA270 416 MHz	128 MB, 64 MB	3" 240×240	179 g	1200	Yes	Yes	Yes	1.3 MP	
Eden	Fujitsu-Siemens Pocket LOOX N100	2006-08	Windows CE 5.0	Samsung SC32442 300 MHz	128 MB, 64 MB	2.8" QVGA	110 g	1150	No	No	Yes	No	
Cheetah	Palm Treo 750, 750v	2006-09	Windows Mobile 5	Samsung SC32442 300 MHz	128 MB, 64 MB	2.6" 240×240	154 g	1200	Yes	No	No	1.3 MP	
Panther	Palm Treo Pro	2008-09	Windows Mobile 6.1	Qualcomm MSM7201 400 MHz / MSM7501 528 MHz	256/512 MB, 128 MB	2.5" 320×320	133 g	1500	Yes	Yes	Yes	1.3 MP	
Kovsky	Sony Ericsson Xperia X1	2008-10	Windows Mobile 6.1	Qualcomm MSM7200A 528 MHz, ARM9 256 MHz	512 MB, 256 MB	3" WVGA	158 g	1500	Yes	Yes	Yes	3.2 MP, 0.3 MP	
Passion	Google Nexus One	2010-01	Android 2.1, 2.2 (2.3 via update)	Qualcomm QSD8250 1000 MHz	512 MB, 512 MB	3.7" WVGA	130 g	1400	No	Yes	Yes	4.9 MP	
Volantis	Google Nexus 9	2014-11	Android 5.0 (7.1.1 via update)	Nvidia Tegra K1 2300 MHz	16 GB/32 GB, 2 GB	8.9" QXGA	436 g	6700	No	Yes	Yes	8 MP	
Sailfish	Google Pixel	2016-10	Android 7.1 (10.0 via update)	Qualcomm Snapdragon 821 (MSM8996 Pro)	32 GB/128 GB, 4 GB	5" FHD	143 g	2770	No	Yes	Yes	12.3 MP	
Marlin	Google Pixel XL	2016-10	Android 7.1 (10.0 via update)	Qualcomm Snapdragon 821 (MSM8996 Pro)	32 GB/128 GB, 4 GB	5.5" QHD	168 g	3450	No	Yes	Yes	12.3 MP	
Walleye	Google Pixel 2	2017-10	Android 8.0 (10.0 via update)	Qualcomm Snapdragon 835	64 GB/128 GB, 4 GB	5" FHD	143 g	2700	No	Yes	Yes	12.2 MP	

== See also ==
- HTC Vive
- O2 Xda
