= List of mobile phones with WVGA display =

Mobile phones with WVGA native display resolution have become common. This is a list of phones that have such displays.

Wide VGA or WVGA an abbreviation for Wide Video Graphics Array is any display resolution with the same 480 pixel height as VGA but wider than 640 pixels, such as 800 × 480, 848 × 480, or 854 × 480.

The following mobile phones have WVGA displays:

- Acer Liquid A1
- Casio G'zOne Commando
- Dell Streak
- Dell Venue
- Dell Venue Pro
- Dell XCD35
- HP Pre 3
- HTC 7 Mozart
- HTC 7 Pro
- HTC 7 Surround
- HTC 7 Trophy
- HTC Desire
- HTC Desire HD
- HTC Desire S
- HTC Desire Z
- HTC Droid Incredible
- HTC EVO 4G
- HTC HD2
- HTC HD7
- HTC Inspire 4G
- HTC ThunderBolt
- HTC Titan
- HTC Touch Diamond2
- HTC Touch HD
- HTC Touch Pro2
- HTC One V
- HTC One ST/SU
- HTC Windows Phone 8S
- HTC Desire V
- HTC Desire X
- Huawei Ascend G300
- Intermec CN51
- Karbonn A15
- Kyocera Zio
- LG GD880 Mini
- LG GD900 Crystal
- LG KM900 (Arena)
- LG Optimus 2X
- LG Optimus 3D
- LG Optimus 7
- LG Optimus Black
- LG Optimus L7
- LG Optimus Q
- LG Quantum
- LG Viewty Smart
- LG VS740 (Ally)
- Mito T300
- Motorola Bravo
- Motorola Defy
- Motorola Droid | Sholes | Tao | A855 | Milestone A853
- Motorola Droid 2
- Motorola Droid X
- Motorola Milestone XT701 (China, Taiwan and Hong Kong)
- Motorola Triumph
- Motorola XT720 (North America and Korea)
- Nexus One
- Nexus S
- Nokia Lumia 520
- Nokia Lumia 525
- Nokia Lumia 610
- Nokia Lumia 625
- Nokia Lumia 710
- Nokia Lumia 720
- Nokia Lumia 800
- Nokia Lumia 820
- Nokia Lumia 900
- Nokia N900
- Nokia X2 Dual Sim
- OlivePad VT 100
- Panasonic T11
- Panasonic T31
- Pantech Vega Racer
- Pantech Burst
- Pantech Laser
- Samsung Focus
- Samsung Galaxy Ace 2
- Samsung Galaxy Core Prime
- Samsung Galaxy J1 (2015)
- Samsung Galaxy J1 Ace
- Samsung Galaxy J1 (2016)
- Samsung Galaxy S | i9000
- Samsung Galaxy S Advance
- Samsung Galaxy S Duos
- Samsung Galaxy S Duos 2
- Samsung Galaxy S Duos 3
- Samsung Galaxy S II | i9100 | i777
- Samsung Galaxy S III Mini
- Samsung Galaxy S Plus | i9001
- Samsung Galaxy SL | i9003
- Samsung Galaxy W
- Samsung Galaxy Xcover 2
- Samsung Galaxy Xcover 3
- Samsung Infuse 4G
- Samsung Omnia 7
- Samsung Omnia II GT-I8000(H/L/U)
- Samsung Omnia Pro B7610
- Samsung Wave S8500
- Samsung Wave II S8530
- Samsung Wave 3 S8600
- Sony Ericsson Xperia X1
- Sony Ericsson Xperia X2
- Sony Ericsson Xperia X10
- Sony Ericsson Xperia arc
- Sony Ericsson Xperia arc S
- Sony Ericsson Xperia ray
- Sony Xperia sola
- Sunberry SunTab
- T-Mobile myTouch 4G
- Toshiba Portégé G900
- ZTE Blade (Orange San Francisco)

== See also ==
- Graphic display resolutions
- List of mobile phones with FWVGA display; FWVGA (854x480) is a subset of WVGA. Phones with FWVGA displays may be found on both lists.
