= HTC Sonata =

Smartphone model

- Manufacturer: High Tech Computer Corporation
- Type: Smartphone
- Media: MiniSD
- Operating system: Windows Mobile 2003 SE
- CPU: TI OMAP 730 200 MHz
- Display: 64k Color 2.2" 176x220px TFT
- Input: Keyboard
- Camera: 0.3-megapixel
- Connectivity: GSM/GPRS class 10, Bluetooth, USB, IR
- Power: Battery

The HTC Sonata is a smartphone model designed by HTC and powered by the Windows Mobile 2003 SE Smartphone Edition operating system. It has 2.2" 176x220px screen resolution. This phone was released in September 2004.

It is also known as Dopod 577W, QTek 8310, O2 Xda IQ, i-mate SP5 & SP5m, Vodafone V1240.

The HTC Sonata is also known as T-Mobile SDA released in Europe. It differs from the T-Mobile SDA II released by the T-Mobile USA which is a HTC Tornado.
