= HTC Gratia =

2010 smartphone by HTC

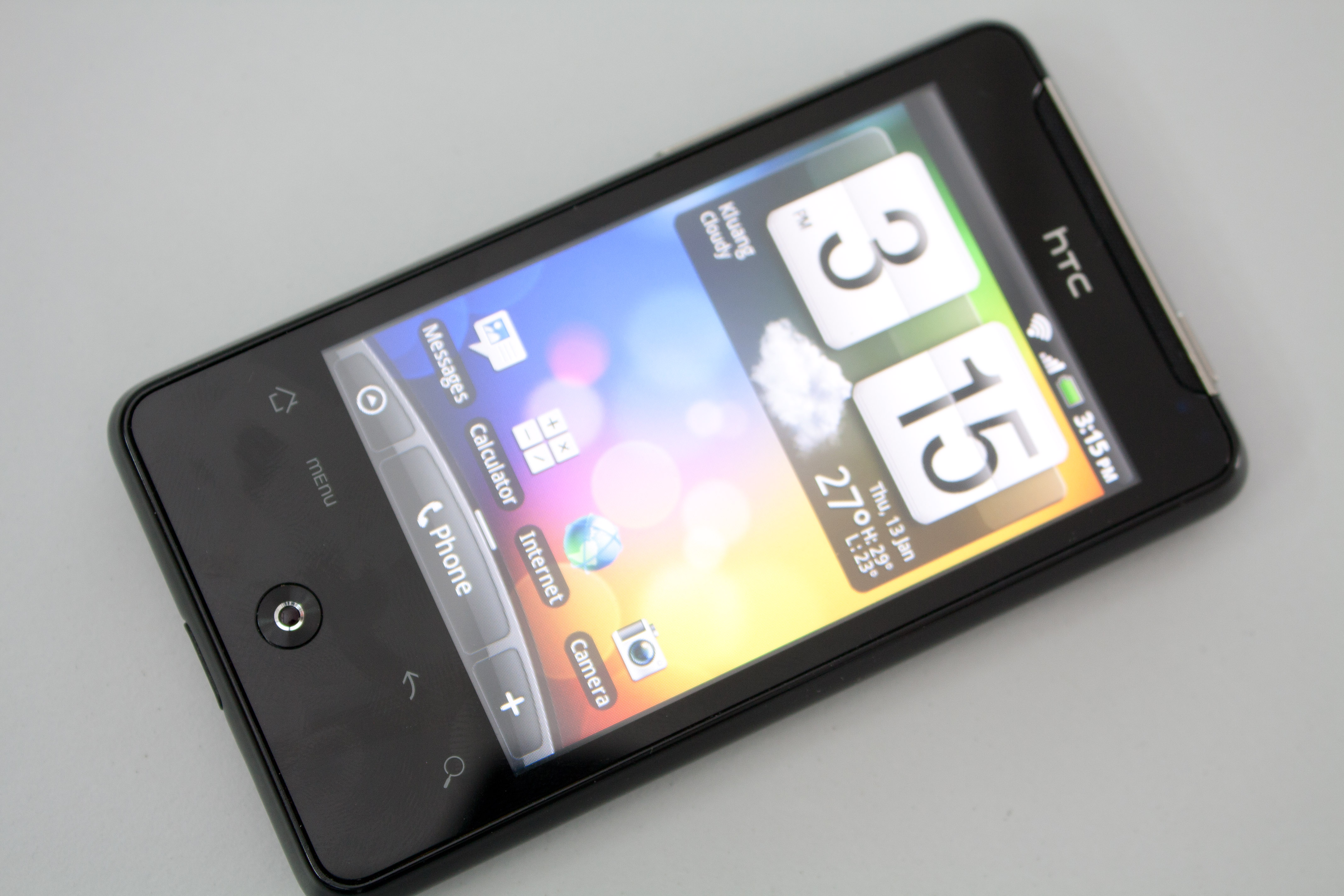
- Manufacturer: HTC
- First released: October 18, 2010
- Compatible networks: AT&T
- Form factor: Slate smartphone
- Dimensions: 104.14 mm (4.100 in) (h); 58.42 mm (2.300 in) (w); 11.68 mm (0.460 in) (d)
- Weight: 115g (4.05 oz)
- Operating system: Android 2.2 (Eclair)
- CPU: 600 MHz Qualcomm MSM7227
- Memory: 384 MB DDR RAM
- Storage: Flash memory: 512 MB microSD memory card (SD 2.0 compatible), microSD slot supports up to 32 GB
- Battery: 1200 mAh, Li-ion; 6 hrs talk time, 372 hrs standby time
- Rear camera: 5.0 megapixel with auto focus
- Display: 320 × 480px; 3.2 inch; HVGA capacitive touchscreen
- Connectivity: GSM 850/900/1800/1900MHz, HSDPA, EDGE, GPRS; Wi-Fi (802.11b/g); Bluetooth 2.1 with A2DP Stereo and EDR; A-GPS; FM tuner, 3.5 mm stereo audio jack, micro-USB
- Data inputs: Multi-touch capacitive touchscreen display, optical joystick, volume controls, ambient light sensors, 3-axis accelerometer, digital compass, proximity sensor

The HTC Gratia is a smartphone manufactured by HTC Corporation that runs the Android operating system with HTC Sense.

== Release ==
The Gratia was released on October 18, 2010. It appears to be a European version of the HTC Aria. Compared to HTC Aria, Gratia runs the more recent Android 2.2 rather than 2.1, which offers speed improvements running apps, and a mobile Wi-Fi hotspot feature for hopping online with the laptop wherever the phone has a 3G signal. However, the 600 MHz processor inside the HTC Gratia doesn't support Adobe Flash streaming video.

== See also ==
- Galaxy Nexus
- Comparison of HTC devices
