= HTC Radar =

Smartphone model

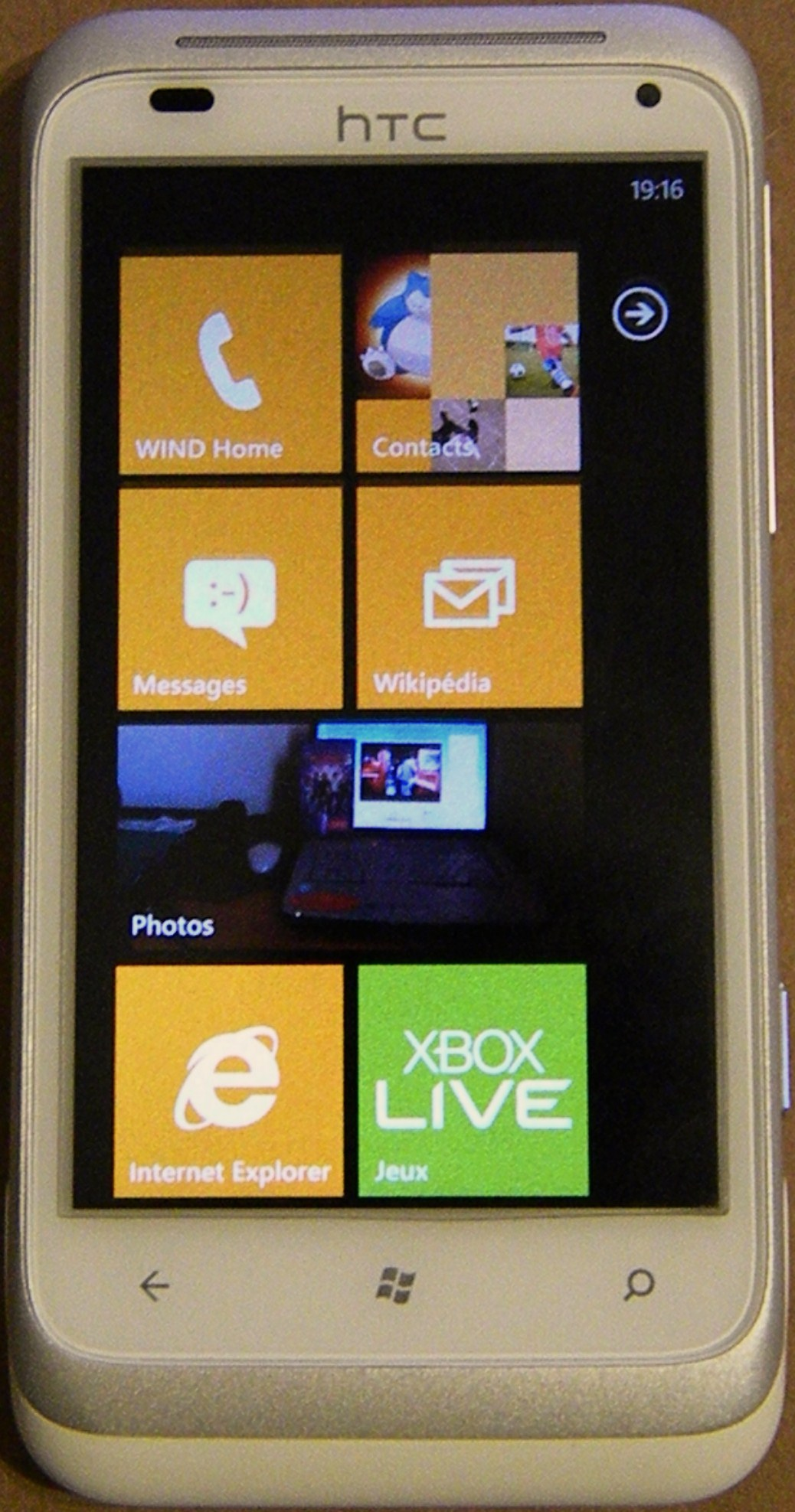
- A white HTC Radar.
- Manufacturer: HTC Corporation
- Availability by region: October 2011
- Related: HTC Trophy; HTC Titan; HTC HD7
- Compatible networks: GSM, HSDPA, Wi-Fi
- Operating system: Windows Phone 7.5
- CPU: Qualcomm MSM8255 1 GHz Scorpion (Snapdragon)
- Memory: 8 GB internal flash 512 MB ROM; 512 MB RAM
- Battery: Rechargeable 1520mAh Li-ion battery (up to 535 hrs standby, 8.0 hrs talk time)
- Rear camera: 5-megapixel autofocus CMOS sensor with dual-flash, video up to 720p resolution
- Front camera: VGA resolution, front-facing
- Display: 3.8 in. S-LCD capacitive touchscreen 480x800 px (~246 ppi pixel density) 16m-color WVGA, backlit TFT LCD
- Connectivity: Bluetooth 2.1, 802.11b/g/n, G-Sensor, A-GPS, micro-USB, 3.5mm audio jack
- Data inputs: Multi-touch capacitive touchscreen, proximity sensor, ambient light sensor, 3-axis accelerometer
- Development status: Released (No longer manufactured)
- Other: Dolby Mobile Sound

The HTC Radar (also known as HTC Radar 4G) is a smartphone running the Windows Phone OS. The phone was designed and manufactured by HTC Corporation. It was announced 1 September 2011, and launched on 12 October 2011.

== Description ==
HTC announced the HTC Radar on 1 September 2011 in London, along with the higher end HTC Titan. The devices were HTC's first smartphones to ship natively with Windows Phone Mango (7.5).

== Launch ==
Microsoft launched HTC Radar, powered by Windows Phone 7.5 Operating system (Codenamed Mango), on 12 October 2011 in India. HTC Radar is the first Mango powered Smart phone in India.

== Reception ==
Ross Miller of The Verge in his review wrote: "Finally, for the platform agnostic – for those who aren’t committed to purchasing Windows Phone hardware – I’m still not quite sure I can recommend this over an Android phone of similar value."

== See also ==
- Windows Phone
