= HTC Startrek =

- Manufacturer: HTC
- Compatible networks: Quad band GSM / GPRS / EDGE: GSM 850 / 900 / 1800 / 1900
- Dimensions: 98×51×16 mm (3.86×2.01×0.63 in)
- Weight: 99 g (3 oz) or 108.5g w/ battery
- Operating system: Windows Mobile 5.0 for Smartphones
- CPU: TI OMAP 850 @ 195 MHz (overclockable to 252/263 MHz)
- Memory: 64 MB SDRAM 128 MB ROM
- Removable storage: microSD
- Battery: 750 or 1100 mA·h
- Rear camera: 1.3 megapixel CMOS
- Display: 2.2 in (56 mm) QVGA (240x320)
- External display: 1.2 in (30 mm) (128x128)
- Connectivity: Bluetooth 1.2, USB 1.1

The HTC Startrek is HTC's first clamshell smartphone. It is sold as the Qtek 8500, the Orange SPV F600, Dopod S300, the i-mate Smartflip, Cingular 3100, Cingular 3125, and the HTC S411 in Brazil.

The Cingular 3100 and 3125 have more ROM and an extended battery. The difference between the two Cingular models is the 3100 does not have a camera while the 3125 does.

The Startrek runs Windows Mobile 5.0 for Smartphones. The Startrek has successfully been upgraded to Windows Mobile 6/6.1 and 6.5 using various non-stock ROMs - however the 6.5 ROMs available are a varying mixture of Chinese and English languages. It has also been overclocked to a stable maximum of 263 MHz without system problems on certain ROMs (most will support 252 MHz overclock).

There are numerous reports across the internet that the external display on this device will stop functioning with no apparent physical damage. HTC and Cingular will not acknowledge the problem, leaving customers stuck with a defective phone or a repair bill costing more than the purchase price.

Also some models allegedly suffer from a case of bad microphone settings, making it near impossible to hear; in that case the phone may need a ROM update.

== Specifications (for Cingular 3125) ==
Size: 98 mm (l) x 51 mm (w) x 16 mm (d)
Weight: 108.5 g with battery
Operating System: Windows Mobile 5.0 for Smartphones
Processor: TI OMAP 850 195 MHz
Memory: 128 MB ROM, 64 MB RAM
Extra storage: MicroSD
Operating Frequency: GSM 850/900/1800/1900 MHz
Cellular data: EDGE Class 10
Camera: 1.3-megapixel CMOS
Screens: 2.2 inch internal LCD, 1.2 inch external
Data transfer: Bluetooth 1.2, USB 1.1
Battery: 1100 mA·h

== Specifications (for Dopod S300) ==
Size: 98.5 mm (l) x 51.4 mm (w) x 15.8 mm (d)
Weight: 99 g with battery
Operating System: Windows Mobile 5.0 for Smartphones
Processor: TI OMAP 850 195 MHz
Memory: 64 MB ROM, 64 MB RAM
Extra storage: MicroSD
Operating Frequency: GSM 850/900/1800/1900 MHz
Cellular data: EDGE Class 10
Camera: 1.3-megapixel CMOS
Screens: 2.2 inch internal LCD, 1.2 inch external
Data transfer: Bluetooth 1.2, USB 1.1
Battery: 750 mA·h

== See also ==
- HTC Excalibur
- HTC TyTN
- Feature phone
