= I-mate 810-F =

Smartphone model

i-mate 810-F
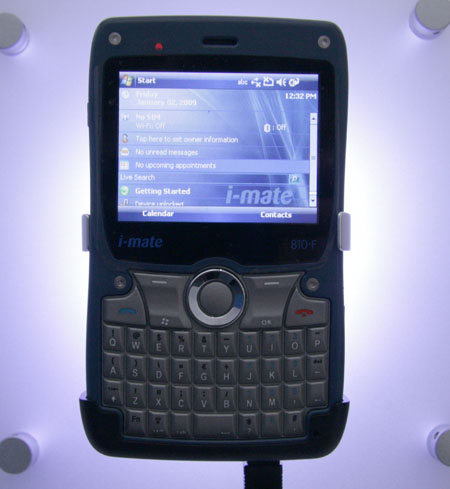
- Manufacturer: i-mate
- Availability by region: Release date 1 July 2009
- Compatible networks: Quad band GSM 850 900 1800 1900, GPRS, EDGE
- Form factor: ruggedised PDA, Smartphone
- Dimensions: 111 mm (4.4 in) (h); 66 mm (2.6 in) (w); 15.5 mm (0.61 in) (d)
- Weight: 150 g (5 oz)
- Operating system: Windows Mobile 6.1
- CPU: Marvell PXA310 at 624 MHz
- Memory: 128 MB RAM; 256 MB ROM; 2 GB NAND Flash
- Battery: 1200 mAh Lithium-ion battery
- Rear camera: 2.0 megapixel rear
- Display: 320 × 240 px, 2.8 in (71 mm), LCD, 4:3 aspect ratio
- Connectivity: Bluetooth 2.0; Wi-Fi (802.11b/g)
- Data inputs: QWERTY Keyboard and Touchscreen

The i-mate 810-F is quad-band Internet-enabled Windows Mobile smartphone. Its name comes from the US military standards for environment tests, MIL-STD-810. I-mate claims the 810-F can withstand temperature extremes of up to 60 degrees and -20 degrees Celsius. It is also waterproofed to 1 metre, and shockproof.

It has a rubber exterior, with a filter over the earpiece to maintain waterproofing. Metal screws are exposed so you can check the factory seals have been maintained, and there is a small plastic stylus located in a slot at the back of the phone. The 810-F features a QWERTY-keyboard, a 2.45-inch 320×240 pixel touchscreen and a five-way clickable navigation pad.

It runs the Windows Mobile 6.1 Professional operating system, with Internet Explorer 6. It offers a digital compass, A-GPS features and a three-axis accelerometer. There is also a 2MP fixed focus camera and 2 GB of storage space. There's no microSD slot to maintain its environmental coherence. Connectivity includes GSM, GPRS, EDGE, UMTS and HSDPA, plus Wi-Fi and Bluetooth 2.0.

I-mate provides a lifetime guarantee for the 810-F (subject to warranty terms and conditions, registration and annual service plan).
