= HTC Amaze 4G =

Smartphone manufactured by HTC

HTC Ruby
- Brand: HTC
- Manufacturer: HTC Corporation
- Type: Smartphone
- First released: October 10, 2011; 14 years ago
- Predecessor: HTC Sensation
- Successor: HTC One S
- Compatible networks: GSM 850/900/1800/1900 MHz, UMTS 850/1700/1900/2100 MHz
- Form factor: Slate
- Dimensions: 130 mm (5.1 in) H 65.6 mm (2.58 in) W 11.8 mm (0.46 in) D
- Weight: 173 g (6.1 oz)
- Operating system: HTC Sense 3.0 with Android 2.3.4 Gingerbread and HTC Sense 3.6 with Android 4.0.3 Ice Cream Sandwich
- CPU: 1.5 GHz dual core Qualcomm Snapdragon S3 (APQ8060)
- GPU: Adreno 220
- Memory: 1 GB RAM, 2.5 GB ROM, 16 GB phone memory (9 GB usable)
- Storage: 16 GB flash
- Removable storage: microSDHC supports up to 32 GB
- Battery: 1730 mAh; Internal Rechargeable Li-ion; User replaceable
- Rear camera: 8 Megapixel with f/2.2 aperture 1080p video Autofocus dual LED flash Geotagging
- Front camera: 2 Megapixel fixed focus
- Display: qHD S-LCD; 4.3 in (109 mm) diagonal 540×960 px at 256 ppi 16:9 aspect ratio
- Connectivity: Bluetooth 3.0 with EDR; Micro USB(ExtMicro); Wi-Fi 802.11a/b/g/n 42 Mbps DC-HSPA+
- Data inputs: Multi-touch, capacitive touchscreen Dual microphones Accelerometer, compass, A-GPS

The HTC Ruby (known as the HTC Amaze 4G in the United States and Canada) is a smartphone developed by the HTC Corporation. It was released by T-Mobile in the United States on 10 October 2011. It was first released in Canada by Telus on 4 November 2011. Subsequently, other Canadian carriers such as Mobilicity and Wind Mobile released this phone on December 1, 2011 and December 2 ,2011, respectively. Marketed at the time as being equipped “with the most advanced camera of any smartphone”, the device has an 8-megapixel camera, a 1080p HD video recorder, a backside illuminated sensor, and a dual LED flash. The Amaze 4G features a Qualcomm Snapdragon S3 1.5 Gdual-corporate processor, a 4.3-inch QHD LCD multi-touch display, and 1 GB of RAM. It was released with version 2.3.4 of the Android operating system. Starting from 21 May 2012, some HTC Amaze devices were upgradeable to Android 4.0.3 Ice Cream Sandwich.

== See also ==
- List of Android smartphones
- Comparison of HTC devices
- Galaxy Nexus
