= HTC Excalibur =

Mobile phone model

HTC Excalibur (HTC S620)
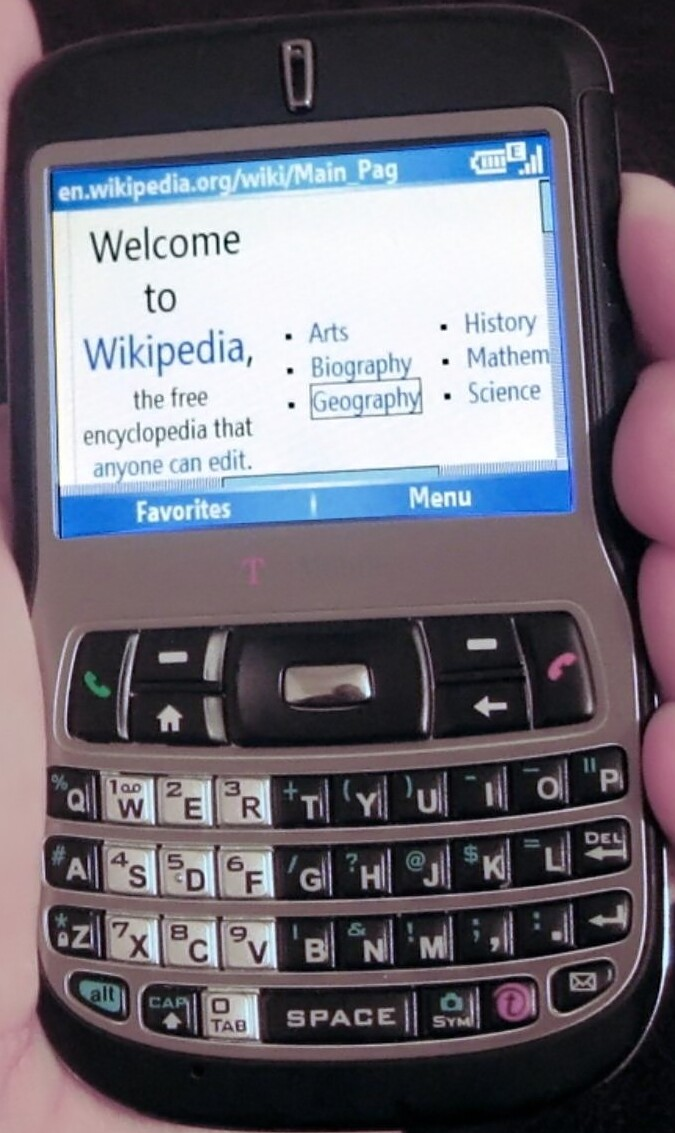
- Manufacturer: High Tech Computer
- Type: Smartphone
- Lifespan: since 2006; 19 years ago
- Media: microSD
- Operating system: Windows Mobile 5.0 / 6.0
- CPU: TI OMAP850 200MHz
- Display: 16-bit color 320x240 TFT
- Input: Illuminated QWERTY keypad, Side touch-bar
- Camera: 1.3-megapixel (1280x1024)
- Touchpad: "JOGGR" side touch-bar
- Connectivity: GSM with EDGE; GPRS 802.11g WiFi; Bluetooth
- Power: Battery

The HTC Excalibur (HTC S620) is a smartphone model manufactured by High Tech Computer beginning in 2006. It is rebranded and sold as the O_{2} Xda Cosmo, the T-Mobile Dash, the HTC S621 for Rogers Wireless in Canada, the HTC S621 for Suncom Wireless in the lower-eastern United States, the BT ToGo (as part of the BT Total Broadband Anywhere package), and the Dopod C720W. The model has been discontinued.

== Features ==
The device runs the Windows Mobile 5 and 6 Smartphone Edition operating systems (AKU 3.0). It uses a 200 MHz Texas Instruments OMAP850 (ARM architecture) processor, with 64 MB of RAM and 128 MB of flash ROM. A microSD slot is also available for additional expansion capability.

It includes a quad band (850 MHz, 900 MHz, 1800 MHz, 1900 MHz) GSM radio with EDGE, 802.11g WiFi support, and Bluetooth communications. The device syncs with ActiveSync or Windows Mobile Device Center (Windows Vista and Windows 7) over Bluetooth or USB. It also has GPRS/EDGE and Wi-Fi connections.

Its successor, the HTC S630 (codenamed Cavalier) was released August 2007.

T-Mobile initially shipped Windows Mobile 5 on all Dash devices but began offering existing Dash owners the ability to update to Windows Mobile 6 on May 4, 2007.

Version of Windows Mobile 6.1 such as Kavanna's and Ricky's are available but not supported by T-Mobile. It also supports Windows Mobile 6.5. This phone has also been ported to android by xda-developers.http://forum.xda-developers.com/showthread.php?t=560495

== Bluetooth ==
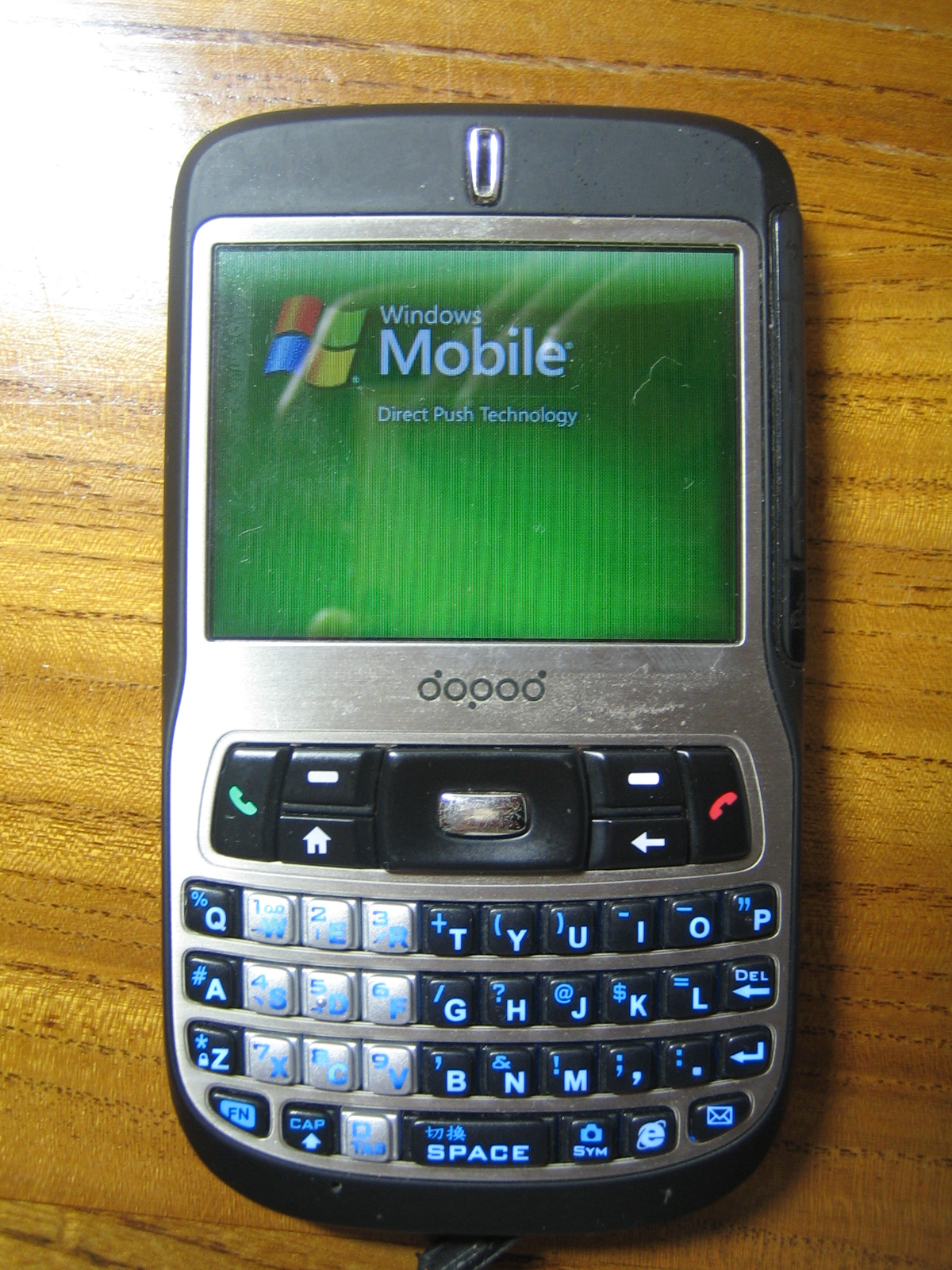
Dopod C720W

The phone supports Bluetooth 2.0 without EDR and could support these profiles:

- A2DP-Source
- AVCTP
- AVDTP
- AVRCP-Target
- BNEP
- FT-Client
- FT-Server
- GAP
- GAVDP
- Generic Object Exchange
- HandsFree-AG (1.0)
- Headset-AG
- HID-Host
- OPP-Client
- OPP-Server
- PAN-AP
- SAP-Server
- SDAP
- Serial-DevA
- Serial-DevB

New firmware versions disable nearly a half of these profiles, including FTP according to the pre-commercial review.

== See also ==
- Samsung Blackjack, a competing smartphone with similar specifications.
- Motorola Q, a competing smartphone with similar specifications.
