= HTC Phoebus =

HTC S520, HTC Phoebus, HTC Juno, T-Mobile Shadow, Dopod C750
- Compatible networks: GPRS/EDGE, GSM Quad Band
- Dimensions: 103mm (L) x 53mm (W) x 15mm (D)
- Weight: 150 g (5 oz)
- Memory: 256 MB ROM, 128 MB RAM
- Display: 2.8" QVGA TFT LCD, 320X240 64K-color screen
- Connectivity: Bluetooth 2.0, Wi-Fi: IEEE 802.11b/g, HTC ExtUSB (11-pin mini-USB and audio jack in one)

The HTC S520 (A.K.A. HTC Phoebus, HTC Juno) is a Windows Mobile-based smartphone manufactured by High Tech Computer Corporation. It is available in the US market as the T-Mobile Shadow and in Taiwan as the Dopod C750. The T-Mobile version supports MyFaves.

== Neo interface ==
T-Mobile, HTC, and Microsoft collaborated on the Neo interface introduced on the T-Mobile version. The interface was designed to allow a more familiar cell phone user interface on a smartphone.

== Shadow 2009 ==
T-Mobile replaced the original Shadow model with a newer one in early 2009. In addition to a design facelift and new colors, it supports Unlicensed Mobile Access through the T-Mobile @Home service. It will also have Windows Mobile 6.1 Standard installed.
