= HTC Smart =

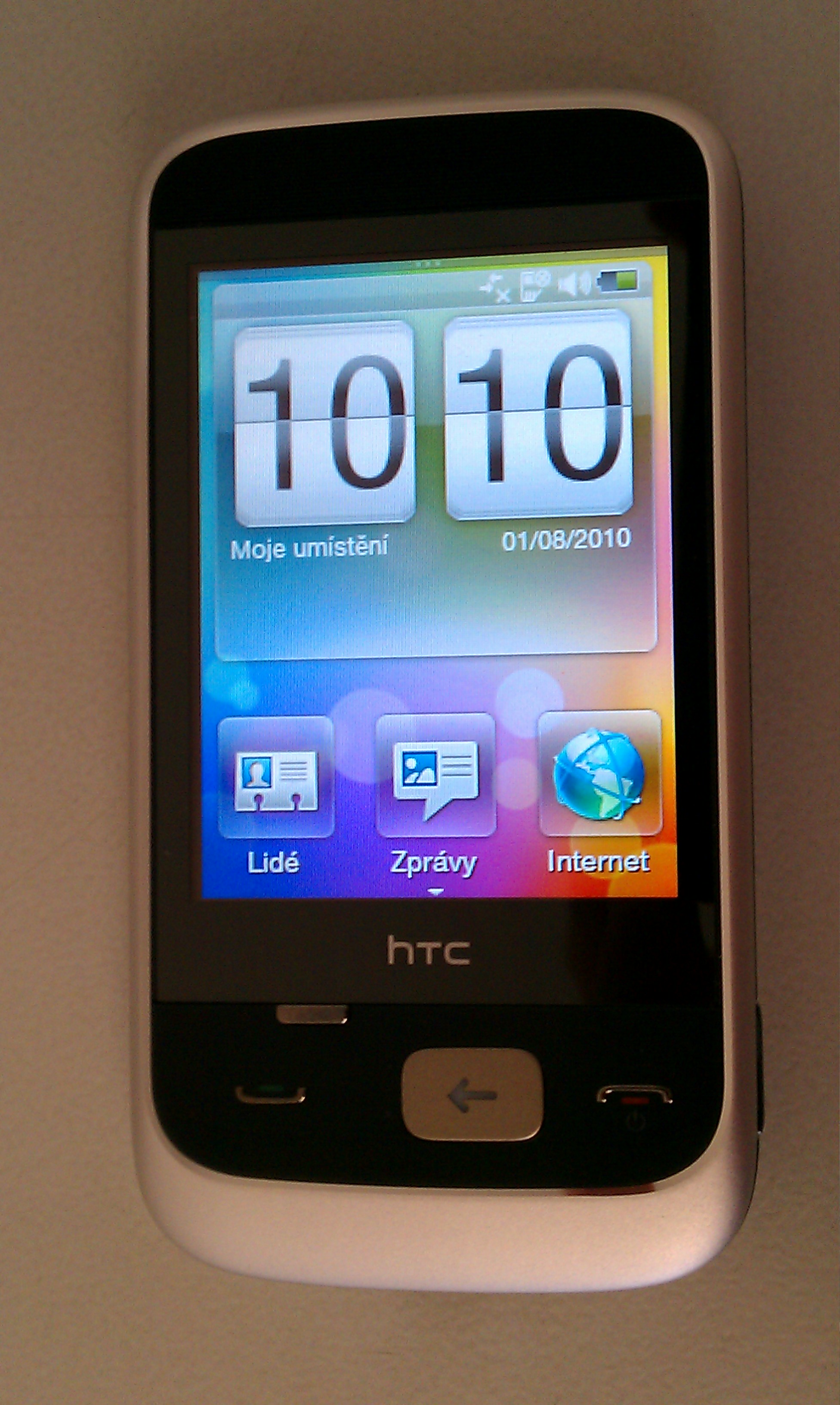
- HTC Smart (white model, O2)
- Brand: HTC
- Manufacturer: HTC Corporation
- Type: Smartphone Feature phone
- Series: BREW
- First released: March 2010; 16 years ago, discontinued
- Related: HTC Freestyle
- Compatible networks: Europe/Asia: HSPA/WCDMA:2100 MHz; Quad-band GSM/GPRS/EDGE: 850/900/1800/1900 MHz
- Dimensions: 104 mm (4.1 in) H 55 mm (2.2 in) W 12.8 mm (0.50 in) D
- Weight: 108 g (3.8 oz)
- Operating system: BREW Mobile Platform
- CPU: 300 MHz
- Memory: 256 MB RAM
- Storage: 256 MB ROM
- Removable storage: microSDHC supports up to 32 GB
- Rear camera: 3 MP with LED flash
- Display: 3.0-inch 240×320 QVGA TFT LCD touch-sensitive screen
- Connectivity: Bluetooth 2.0 with EDR; HTC ExtUSB™ (11-pin mini-USB 2.0)
- Data inputs: Resistive touch screen

HTC Smart (F3188 aka HTC Rome 100) is a budget smartphone, commonly referred to by critics as a feature phone produced by HTC Corporation. It is based on Qualcomm's BREW mobile operating system. HTC Smart was officially announced on January 7, 2010. O2 was announced as the exclusive mobile carrier for the UK (O2 (UK)), Germany (Telefónica Germany) and Ireland (O2 (Ireland)) and was released on March 15, 2010 in Europe and Asia.
