= HTC Iris =

Smartphone

HTC S640, HTC Iris
- Compatible networks: CDMA 1X/EVDO
- Dimensions: 101mm (L) x 59.6mm (W) x 13.9mm (D)
- Weight: 112 g (4 oz)
- CPU: Qualcomm MSM7500, 400MHz
- Memory: 256 MB ROM, 64 MB RAM, expandable microSD slot
- Display: 2.8" QVGA TFT LCD, 320X240 64K-color screen
- Connectivity: Bluetooth 2.0, Wi-Fi: IEEE 802.11b/g, HTC ExtUSB (11-pin mini-USB and audio jack in one)

The HTC S640 (a.k.a. The HTC Iris) is a smartphone manufactured by High Tech Computer Corporation exclusively for Telus clients.

== Availability ==
As of October 2007, the phone has been offered exclusively from Telus.

== See also ==
- High Tech Computer Corporation, a Taiwan-based manufacturer of handheld devices
