= Motorola Triumph =

Android smartphone

- Brand: Motorola
- Type: Smartphone
- First released: July 20, 2011
- Availability by region: United States - July 20, 2011 (Virgin Mobile)
- Discontinued: March 29, 2013
- Compatible networks: 1900 MHz PCS CDMA EV-DO Rev. A
- Form factor: Slate
- Dimensions: 4.80 in (122 mm) H 2.60 in (66 mm) W 0.39 in (9.9 mm) D
- Weight: 143 g (5.0 oz)
- Operating system: Android 2.2 Froyo
- CPU: 1 GHz Qualcomm MSM8655 Snapdragon
- Memory: 512 MB RAM
- Storage: 1 GB ROM
- Removable storage: microSD (supports up to 32 GB)
- Battery: Motorola FB-02 3.7V, 1380 mAh; Internal Rechargeable Li-ion; User replaceable
- Rear camera: 5.0 MP with LED flash
- Front camera: 0.3 MP VGA 640x400
- Display: LCD, 4.1 in (100 mm) diagonal 800×480 WVGA
- Connectivity: 3.5 mm TRRS; Bluetooth 2.1 + EDR with A2DP; HDMI; Micro USB 2.0; Wi-Fi 802.11b/g/n
- Data inputs: Multi-touch capacitive touchscreen A-GPS; S-GPS; Accelerometer; Microphone; Proximity sensor Push buttons
- SAR: Head - 1.09 W/kg; Body - 1.19 W/kg

The Motorola Triumph is an Android powered smartphone available in the United States exclusively through Virgin Mobile USA. The device is similar to Huawei's U9000 Ideos X6 model sold internationally. The Triumph is the first Motorola-branded device sold by Virgin Mobile USA. Sprint Nextel and Motorola announced the Triumph at a joint press event held in New York City on June 9, 2011.

The Triumph features a 4.1-inch capacitive touch screen, a 1 GHz Qualcomm MSM8655 Snapdragon processor, a rear-facing 5-megapixel camera with auto-focus, LED flash, and 720p HD video recording, a front-facing VGA camera, and Android 2.2 Froyo.

The Triumph does not include the MOTOBLUR interface commonly found on other Android-powered Motorola devices. The Triumph is the first device to come preloaded with Virgin Mobile USA's new Virgin Mobile Live 2.0 app, a social networking music application. The Triumph is the third Android device to come to Virgin Mobile. The Samsung Intercept was Virgin Mobile's first Android device followed by the LG Optimus V.

== See also ==
- List of Android devices
- Galaxy Nexus
