= HTC 7 Pro =

Smartphone manufactured by HTC

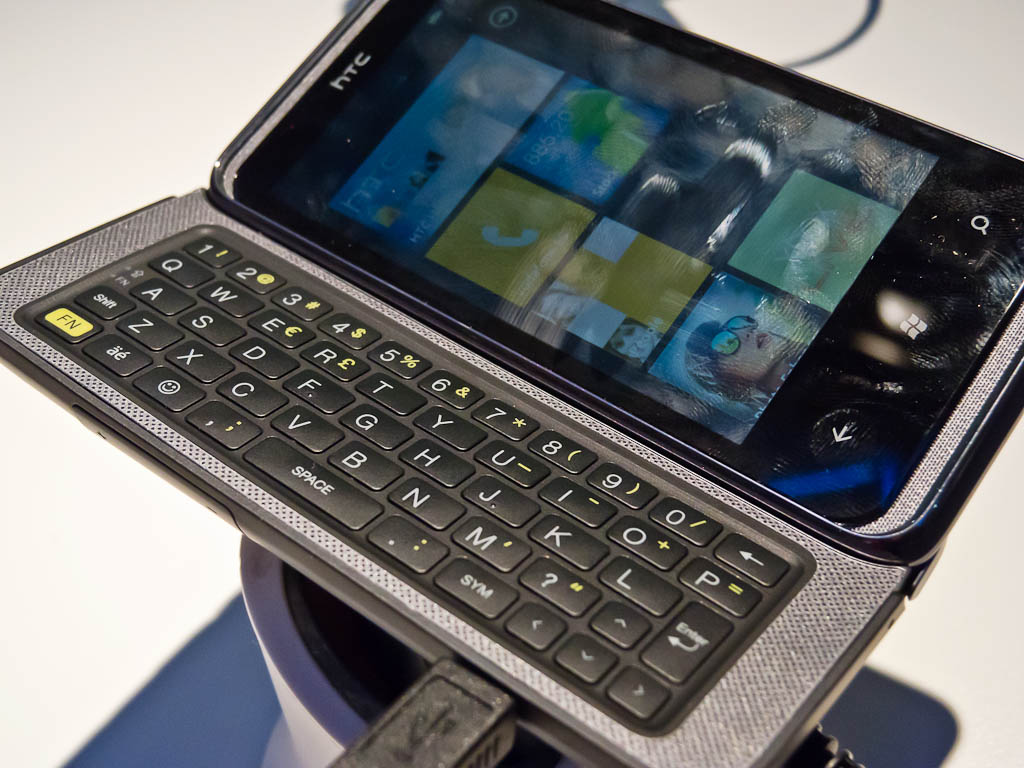
- Manufacturer: HTC Corporation
- Series: HTC 7 Series (Windows Phone)
- Predecessor: HTC Touch Pro2
- Related: HTC 7 Trophy, HTC HD7, HTC 7 Mozart, HTC 7 Surround
- Compatible networks: GSM, HSDPA, WiFi, CDMA
- Dimensions: 117.5 x 59 x 15.5 mm (4.63 x 2.32 x 0.61 in)
- Weight: 185 g / 6.53 oz (with battery)
- Operating system: Windows Phone; 7.0.7389.0 (USA)
- CPU: Qualcomm QSD8250 1 GHz Scorpion (Snapdragon); Qualcomm QSD8650 1 GHz Scorpion (Snapdragon) on CDMA carriers
- Memory: Internal flash: 8 GB(GSM)/16 GB(CDMA); 512 MB ROM; 576 MB RAM
- Battery: Rechargeable 1500mAh Li-ion battery (up to 360 hrs standby) Optional Extended battery available 3600mAh
- Rear camera: 5-megapixel autofocus CMOS sensor, video up to 720p resolution
- Display: 3.6 in. Super-LCD capacitive touchscreen 480x800 px (259 ppi) 16m-color WVGA
- Connectivity: Bluetooth 2.1, 802.11b/g/n, G-Sensor, Digital Compass, A-GPS, micro-USB, 3.5mm audio jack
- Data inputs: Multi-touch capacitive touchscreen QWERTY slide-out keyboard Proximity sensor Ambient light sensor Digital compass

The HTC 7 Pro (also known as the HTC Arrive) is a business class smartphone, part of the HTC 7 series of Internet-enabled, Windows Phone smartphones designed and marketed by HTC Corporation. It is the successor of the HTC Touch Pro2 with a left-side slide-out QWERTY keyboard, with tilting screen.

The CDMA variation of the HTC 7 Pro, known on Sprint Nextel as the HTC Arrive, became available on the Sprint Nextel CDMA network on 20 March 2011. It is also available on US Cellular and Alltel Wireless under its original name of the HTC 7 Pro.

The phone initially comes with the 7.0.7389.0 firmware version, which includes "NoDo" update (March Update) that has features and fixes, which include improvements to functions like copy & paste, faster apps and games, better Marketplace search, Wi-Fi, Outlook, Facebook integration, camera, audio, and other performance improvements.

== See also ==
- Windows Phone
