= HTC Touch Pro2 =

2009 Windows Mobile smartphone

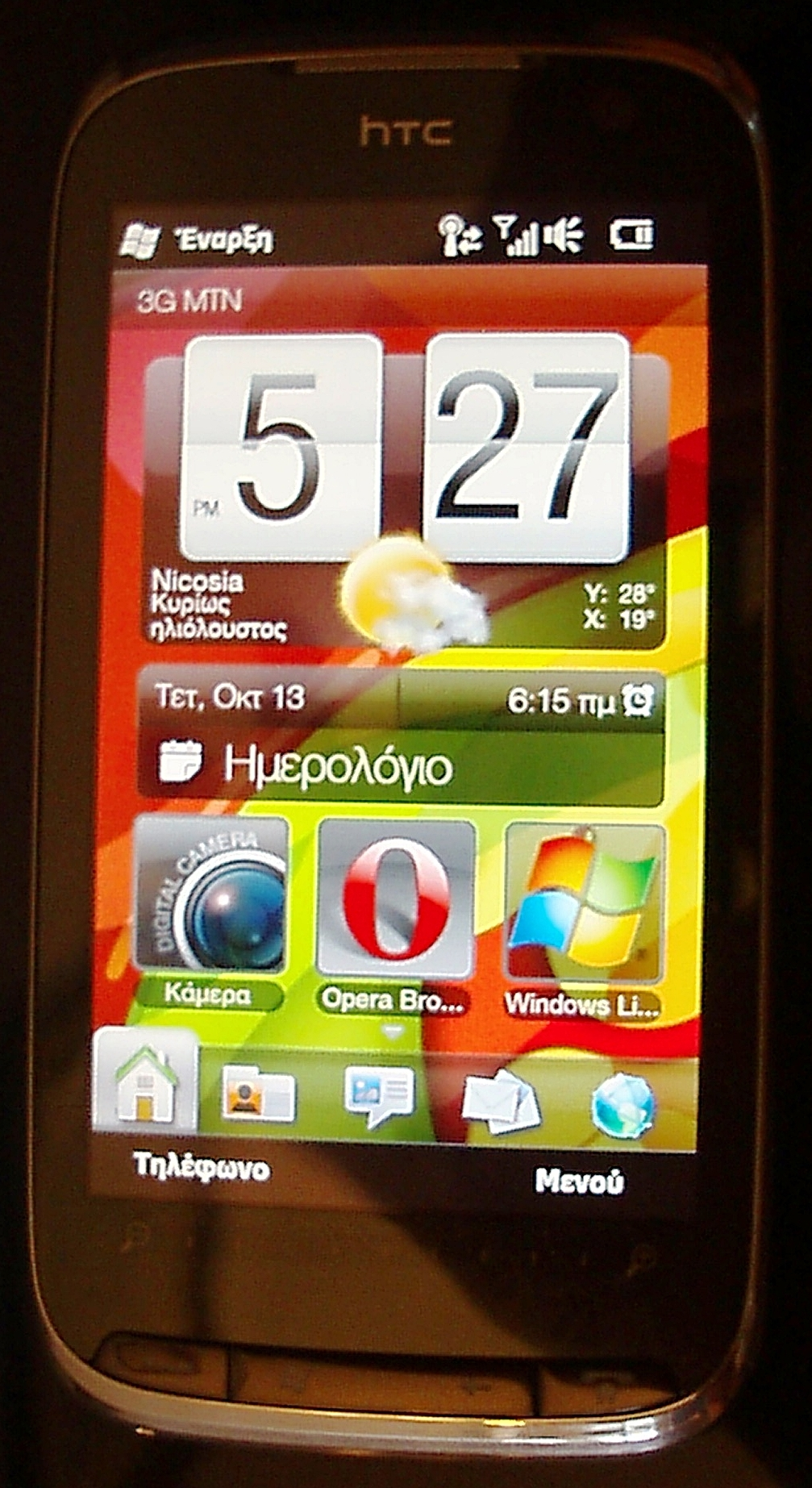
- Manufacturer: HTC Corporation
- Series: HTC Touch family
- Predecessor: HTC Touch Pro
- Successor: HTC 7 Pro
- Related: HTC Touch Diamond2
- Compatible networks: AT&T Mobility, Sprint Nextel, T-Mobile USA, US Cellular, Verizon Wireless, Unlocked GSM
- Form factor: Slide
- Dimensions: 116.8 × 58.4 × 17.8 mm (4.6 × 2.3 × 0.7 inches)
- Weight: 175.8 g (6.2 oz) w/ battery
- Operating system: Windows Mobile 6.5 Professional, Android
- CPU: Qualcomm MSM7200A ARM11 @ 528 MHz
- Memory: 288 MB RAM
- Removable storage: microSDHC, up to 32 GB
- Battery: 1500 mAh
- Rear camera: 3.2 megapixel AF back
- Display: 480×800 px (WVGA), 3.6 in (91 mm),
- Media: Windows Media Player Mobile
- Connectivity: HTC ExtUSB, Bluetooth 2.1 + EDR, A2DP
- Data inputs: QWERTY Keyboard and resistive touchscreen
- Hearing aid compatibility: M3
- Other: Official website

The HTC Touch Pro2 (also known as the AT&T Tilt 2, HTC Tytn III; codename: HTC Rhodium, HTC Barium, HTC Tungsten, HTC Fortress) is a slate smartphone, part of the Touch series of Internet-enabled, Windows Mobile, Pocket PC smartphones designed and marketed by HTC Corporation of Taiwan. It is an enhanced version of the HTC Touch Pro with a left-side slide-out QWERTY keyboard, with tilting screen. The Touch Pro2 smartphone's functions include those of a camera phone and a portable media player in addition to text messaging and multimedia messaging. It also offers Internet services including e-mail, instant messaging, web browsing, and local Wi-Fi connectivity. Visual voicemail is not a standard feature for the Touch Pro2, unlike its predecessor the Touch Pro. The Verizon Wireless version does include a visual voicemail application, however. All versions feature TouchFLO 3D — a new enhanced version of the TouchFLO interface, unique only to the latest Touch series. The latest update renamed TouchFLO 3D to SenseUI, to match HTC's Android offering. The Touch Pro2 — along with its sister model, the Touch Diamond2 — were unveiled on February 16, 2009 in Barcelona, Spain at the Mobile World Congress 2009. Specific enhancements over the original Touch Pro include:

- Larger 3.6-inch WVGA display (0.2" smaller than the Touch HD)
- Improved battery life
- Conference calls with up to five other people using HTC Straight Talk, a new speaker phone system that includes two speakers and two microphones (for increased volume and noise cancellation, respectively)
- Tiltable screen

The Touch Pro2 was released in May 2009.

On August 6, 2009 Telus Mobility in Canada became the first North American carrier to launch the HTC Touch Pro2. The T-Mobile USA–branded Touch Pro2 was released on August 12, 2009. Sprint's version became available on September 8, 2009 and Verizon's version of the Touch Pro2 became available on September 11, 2009. The AT&T version branded Tilt 2 was released October 18, 2009 with Windows Mobile 6.5

As of November 2009, unofficial firmware for GSM and CDMA versions have been released by third parties. The XDAndroid project makes it possible to run Android on HTC Windows Mobile phones, including the Touch Pro2.

With a third party SIM card adaptor, the Pro2 is dual-SIM capable.

HTC manufactures Windows Mobile and Android-based Communicators which have a proprietary connector called HTC ExtUSB (Ext[ended] USB) which is present on the Touch Pro2. ExtUSB combines mini-USB (with which it is backwards-compatible) with audio/video input and output in an 11-pin connector.
