= HTC Aria =

Smartphone model

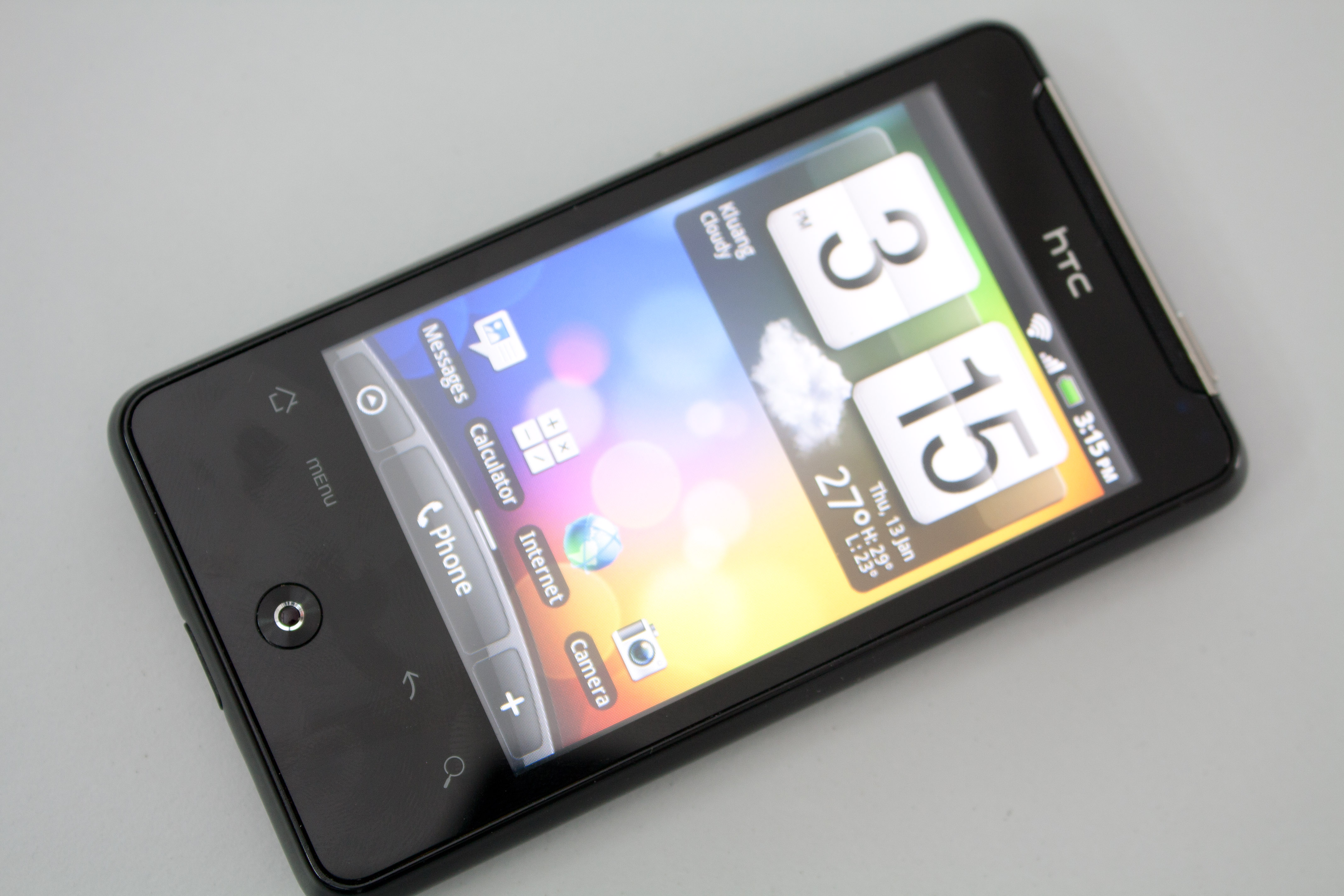
- Manufacturer: HTC
- First released: June 20, 2010
- Form factor: Slate smartphone
- Dimensions: 104.14 mm (4.100 in) (h); 58.42 mm (2.300 in) (w); 11.68 mm (0.460 in) (d)
- Weight: 115g (4.05 oz)
- Operating system: Android 2.1 (Eclair) and HTC Sense (with Friend Stream), upgradable to 2.2 via HTC, or 2.3 via CyanogenMod 7
- CPU: 600 MHz Qualcomm MSM7227
- Memory: 384 MB DDR RAM
- Storage: Flash memory: 512 MB microSD memory card (SD 2.0 compatible), microSD slot supports up to 32 GB
- Battery: 1200 mAh, Li-ion; 6 hrs talk time, 372 hrs standby time
- Rear camera: 5.0 megapixel with auto focus
- Display: 320 × 480px; 3.2 inch; HVGA capacitive touchscreen
- Connectivity: GSM 850/900/1800/1900MHz, HSDPA, EDGE, GPRS; Wi-Fi (802.11b/g); Bluetooth 2.1 with A2DP Stereo and EDR; A-GPS; FM tuner, 3.5 mm stereo audio jack, micro-USB
- Data inputs: Multi-touch capacitive touchscreen display, optical joystick, volume controls, ambient light sensors, 3-axis accelerometer, digital compass, proximity sensor
- Codename: Liberty

The HTC Aria (A6366; or Liberty, or Intruder) is a smartphone manufactured by HTC Corporation that runs the Android operating system with HTC Sense.

== Release ==
The Aria was released on June 20, 2010, and is available through AT&T. In Japan, eMobile offered the phone from the end of 2010. It is a combination of similar design and hardware from HTC, incorporating the same physical design as the HTC HD Mini, the same capacitive buttons and optical joystick as the Droid Incredible, and the same software introduced on the HTC Desire and HTC Legend. After the Motorola Backflip, it is the second Android device for AT&T Wireless, and it was better received by critics than its predecessor. The HTC Aria was also introduced in Asia Pacific and it retails at RM1799 (about US$562) in Malaysia. On September 28, 2010, HTC Australia announced that the HTC Aria would go on sale in Australia in mid-October.

In September 2010, an update was released, adding Firmware Over The Air, an update to Bluetooth, and a Calendar fix.

On February 26, 2011, the Android 2.2 update for the HTC Aria was made available to AT&T customers.

== Sideloading ==
AT&T Wireless faced criticism for its inability to download .apk files—Android applications outside of the Android Market. AT&T cited security issues as a reason. On July 9, 2010, HTC released an update for their HTC Sync program that is used to sync their phones to a PC. The update (version 3.0.5372) gave the ability to side-load non-market applications to the device. Sideloading was only possible by syncing the phone, and installing the app to the Aria through the computer. However, the update which included this side-loading feature was taken down a few days later. HTC Sync version 3.0.5372 can still be downloaded through third-party websites not affiliated with AT&T or HTC. It is still possible to side-load .apk files through the Android Debug Bridge. This requires the use of the Android SDK and must be done through the command line. This restriction can also be removed by way of third-party ROMs.

The official Android 2.2 update prevents rooting the device, disallowing loading of custom ROMs. Root access can be restored through a multi-step process that requires the device to be connected to a computer.

== Reception ==
Reception for the HTC Aria is generally mixed. It was praised for its speed and its interior yellow design. Others criticized the lack of a camera flash. It was also criticized for its low resolution screen. The Aria was heavily criticized for not being able to sideload apps.
