= HTC Cavalier =

Mobile phone model

HTC Cavalier (HTC S630)
- Manufacturer: High Tech Computer
- Type: Smartphone
- Availability by region: 2006
- Operating system: Windows Mobile 6.0
- CPU: Samsung Samsung SC32442 400MHz
- Rear camera: 2-megapixel
- Display: 16-bit color 320x240 TFT
- Media: microSD
- Connectivity: GSM with EDGE, GPRS, 802.11g WiFi, Bluetooth
- Data inputs: Illuminated QWERTY keypad, Side touch-bar

The HTC Cavalier (HTC S630) is a smartphone model manufactured by High Tech Computer beginning in 2006.

The Cavalier supported 3G.
