= HTC HD7 =

Smartphone manufactured by HTC

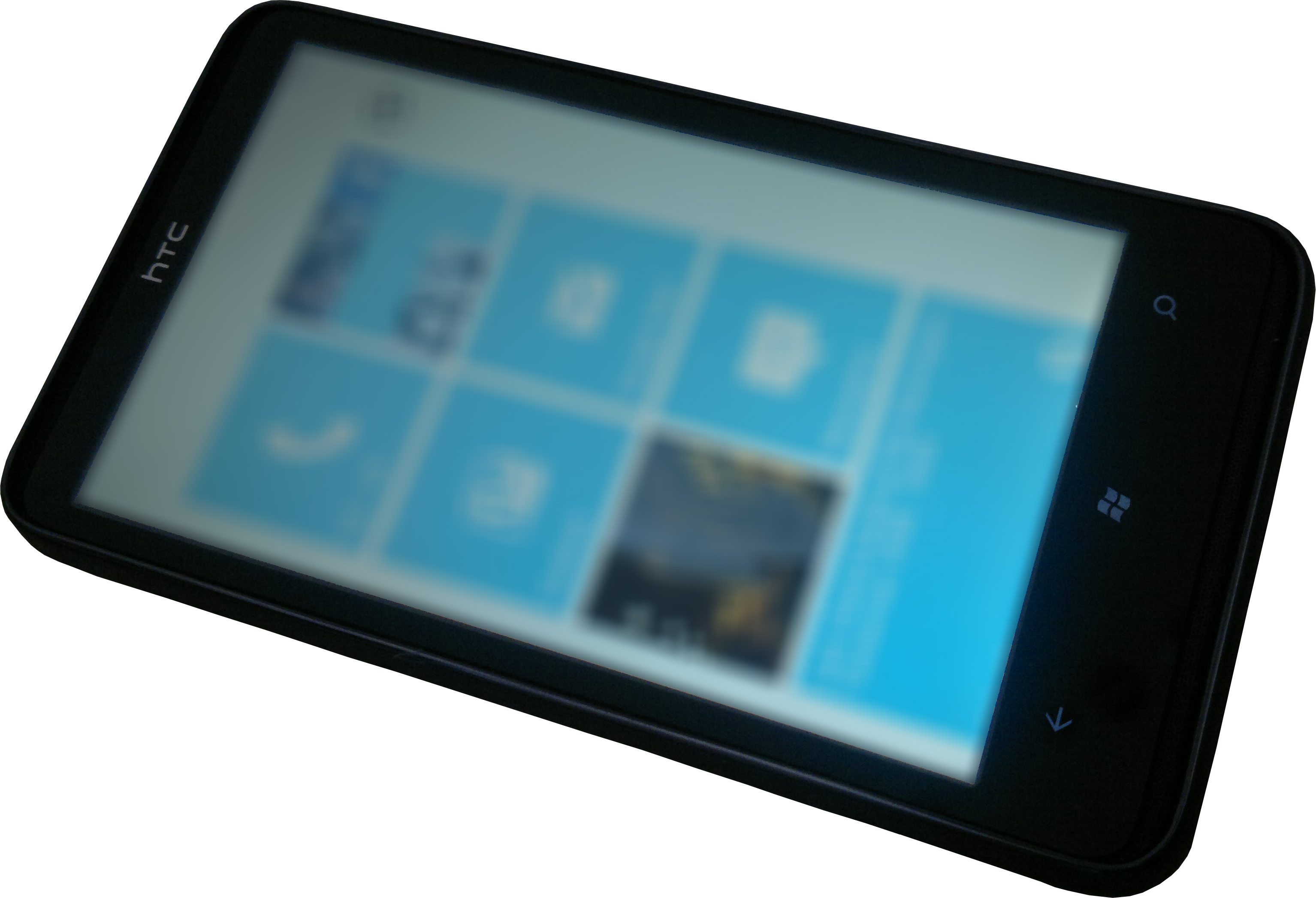
- Manufacturer: HTC Corporation
- Series: HTC Touch family
- Availability by region: 21 October 2010: Europe and Asia-Pacific, 8 November 2010: North America
- Predecessor: HTC HD2
- Successor: HTC TITAN
- Related: HTC 7 Trophy, HTC 7 Pro, HTC 7 Mozart, HTC 7 Surround
- Compatible networks: Europe: HSPA/WCDMA 900/2100, GSM 850/900/1800/1900; Asia Pacific: HSPA/WCDMA 900/2100, GSM 850/900/1800/1900
- Dimensions: 122 x 68 x 11.2 mm (4.8 x 2.68 x 0.44 in)
- Weight: 162 g / 5.7 oz (with battery)
- Operating system: Windows Phone 7.5
- CPU: (Qualcomm Snapdragon QSD8250); 1 GHz Scorpion processor / Adreno 200 graphics
- Memory: Flash Memory microSD (hidden) (European Union) 8 GB, (United States) 8 GB and 16 GB, (United Kingdom) 16 GB Asia Pacific: 16 GB, 512 MB ROM, 576 MB RAM
- Battery: Rechargeable 1230mAh Li-ion battery (Extended Battery Available)(up to 320 hrs standby, 6.3 hrs talk time)
- Rear camera: 5-megapixel autofocus with dual LED flash, CMOS sensor, HD video recording up to 720p of resolution.
- Display: 109 mm (4.3") LCD capacitive touchscreen 480x800 px 216 PPI 16m-color WVGA
- Connectivity: Bluetooth 2.1 + EDR, Wi-Fi 802.11b/g/n, A-GPS, micro-USB, 3.5mm audio jack
- Data inputs: Multi-touch Capacitive Touchscreen, Proximity Sensor, Ambient Light Sensor, 3-axis Accelerometer, Magnetometer
- Development status: General availability (GA)
- Test mode: ##3282#
- Other: Dolby Mobile and SRS surround sound, Kickstand
- Website: http://www.htc.com/www/smartphones/htc-hd7/

The HTC HD7 (also known as the HTC Schubert, HTC HD3), is a smartphone running the Windows Phone OS operating system. The phone was designed and manufactured by HTC. It is the successor to the HTC HD2, and it has a special variant which is the HTC HD7S.

== Description ==
The HTC HD7 was announced at the Windows Phone event in New York City on 11 October 2010.

Leaked photographs prior to the launch of the HD7 indicated that the HD7 was originally named the HD3. It is possible that HTC changed the name of the product before launch so as to tie in with the Windows Phone brand.

Also announced March 2011, was the HD7S, which is largely identical, but with a Super LCD screen.

The HD7 shares nearly all its specifications with its older Windows Mobile 6.5-running brother, the HD2, including the screen resolution and size (109 mm diagonal and WVGA 800x480 resolution).

== HTC HD7S ==
The HTC HD7S is a special variation of the HTC HD7 available exclusively to AT&T. Unlike the original HTC HD7 which has a TFT-LCD, the HTC HD7S has Super-LCD screen. The HTC HD7S's Super LCD screen is brighter and more vivid than the original TFT-LCD screen on the HD7.

== See also ==
- Windows Phone
- HTC HD2 – The predecessor of the HD7, with mostly similar specifications.
- HTC Touch HD – The predecessor of the HD2.
- HTC HD Mini – A miniature of the HD2.
- HTC Touch
- HTC Touch family
- HTC Titan – the successor of the HD7.
