= HTC Titan =

Smartphone running Windows Phone OS 7.5

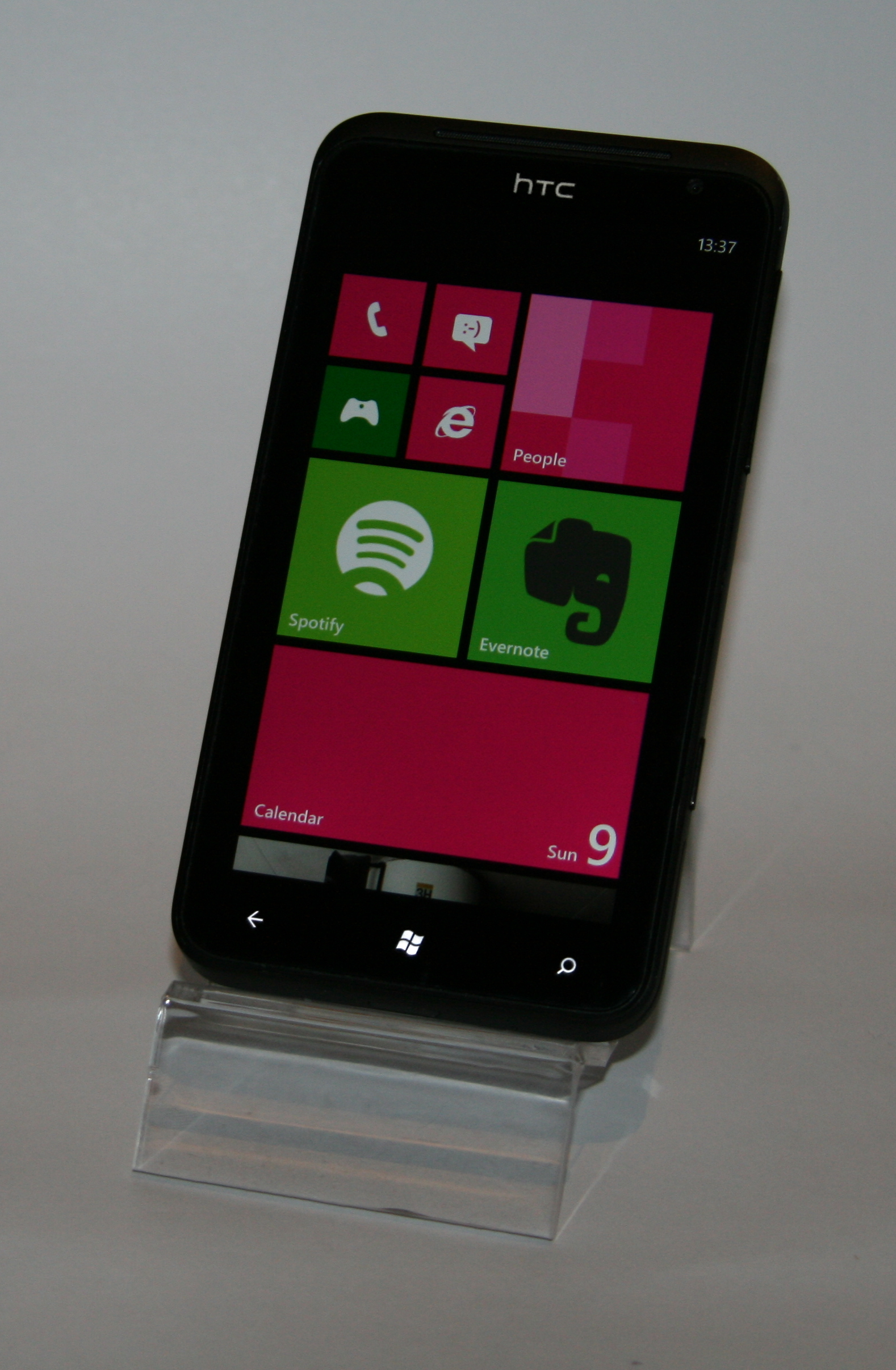
- An HTC Titan running Windows Phone 7
- Manufacturer: HTC Corporation
- Availability by region: October 7, 2011 (United Kingdom)
- Successor: HTC Titan II
- Related: HTC Radar; HTC HD7
- Dimensions: 131.5 mm (5.18 in) (h); 70.7 mm (2.78 in) (w); 9.9 mm (0.39 in) (d)
- Weight: 160 g (6 oz)
- Operating system: Windows Phone 7.5
- CPU: 1.5 GHz Scorpion SoC processor; Qualcomm Snapdragon S2 MSM8255T
- GPU: Adreno 205; 41 MPolygon/s, 245 Mpixel/s fill rate
- Memory: 512 MB RAM
- Storage: 16 GB flash memory
- Battery: Rechargeable / Removable 1600mAh Li-ion battery (up to 460 hrs standby, 6.7 hrs talk time)
- Rear camera: 8 MP with F2.2 lens, autofocus, dual LED flash, back side illumination, CMOS sensor, HD video recording up to 720p resolution
- Front camera: 1.3 MP for video calls
- Display: 4.7 in. 480 × 800 px WVGA; S-LCD capacitive touchscreen 198 PPI, 16.7 million colors (24 bits)
- Connectivity: Bluetooth 2.1 + EDR, Wi-Fi (802.11 b/g/n), DLNA, A-GPS, micro-USB, 3.5mm audio jack
- Data inputs: Multi-touch touch screen, proximity and ambient light sensors, 6-axis gyroscope and accelerometer, magnetometer, microphone
- Other: SRS surround sound, HTC Watch
- Website: www.htc.com/www/smartphones/htc-titan

The HTC Titan (stylized and marketed as uppercase HTC TITAN; also known as the HTC Eternity in China, and HTC Ultimate in Brazil), is a smartphone running the Windows Phone OS 7.5 (codename Mango) operating system. The phone was designed and manufactured by HTC Corporation. It is the successor to the HTC HD7.

== Description ==
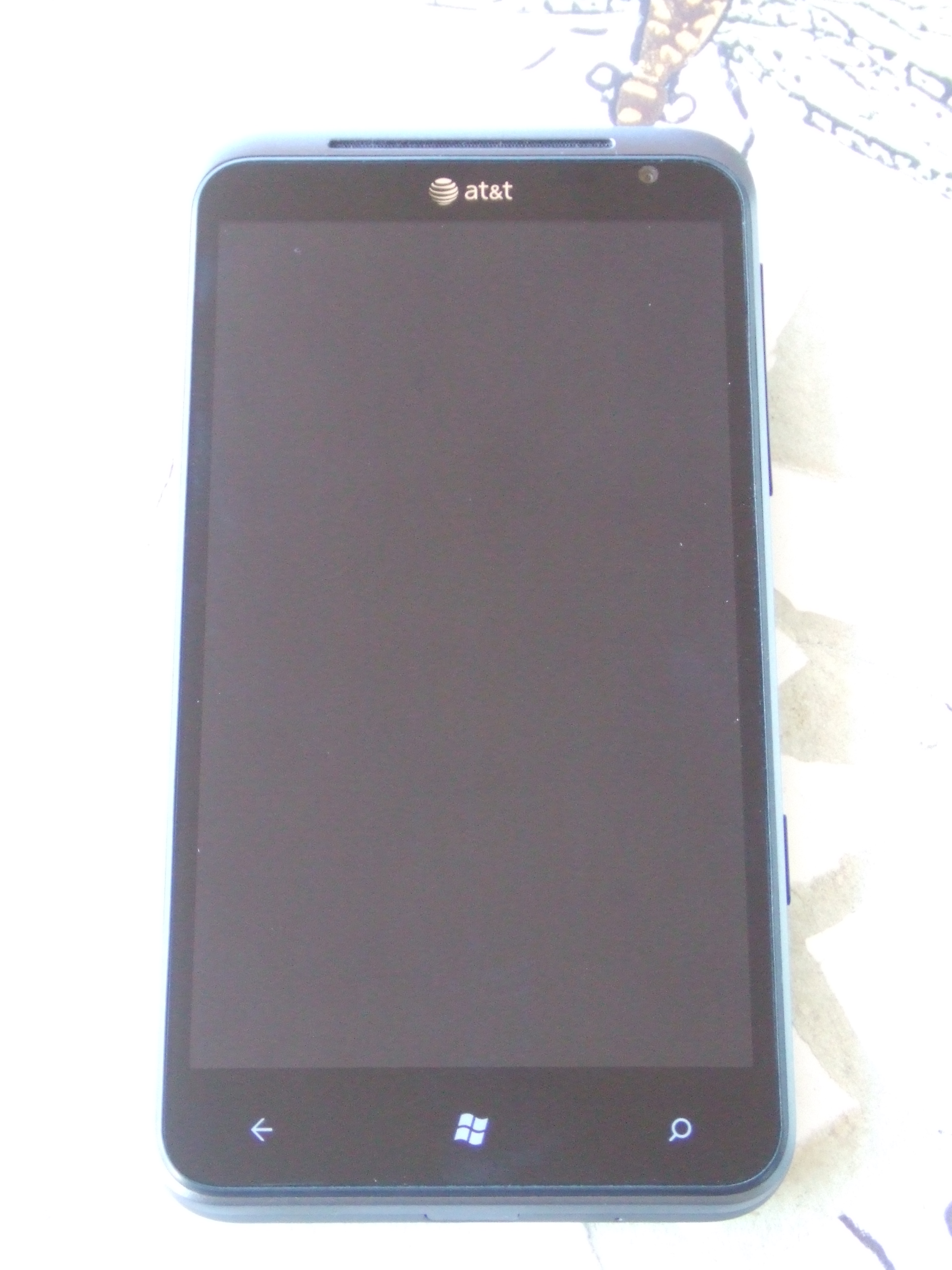
A blue AT&T-branded HTC Titan

HTC announced the HTC Titan on September 1, 2011, in London. It has a 4.7-inch S-LCD screen which was the largest available on any Windows Phone at the time of its release. The HTC Titan also has a 1.5 GHz processor with 512 MB RAM and 16 GB internal memory.

On 9 January 2012, the successor to the Titan, the Titan II, was announced as the first Windows Phone handset with LTE. The Titan II is similar to the Titan, with the major changes being LTE enabled and improving the camera to 16 megapixels.

== Reception ==
The phone has been well received by reviewers. It has been called the flagship Windows phone by multiple reviewers.

== See also ==
- Windows Phone
