= HTC Tornado =

Mobile phone model

- Manufacturer: High Tech Computer Corporation
- Type: Smartphone
- Media: MiniSD
- Operating system: Windows Mobile
- CPU: TI OMAP 850
- Display: 64k-color QVGA TFT
- Input: Keyboard
- Camera: 1.3-megapixel
- Connectivity: GSM/GPRS, Bluetooth, WiFi, USB, IR
- Power: Battery

The HTC Tornado is a smartphone model designed by High Tech Computer Corporation and powered by the Windows Mobile 5 operating system. It has QVGA display resolution.

The Tornado is rebranded as at least 9 different models: the Dopod 586W, Qtek 8300, T-Mobile USA SDA (AKA SDA II), Cingular 2125, i-mate SP5 and Orange SPV C600. These individual companies customize the operating system and sell it as a consumer package.

== Features ==
- 240 x 320 pixels TFT display (65k colors)
- 1.3-megapixel camera
- 64 MB SDRAM, 64 MB Flash ROM, miniSD card slot
- TI OMAP 850, 200 MHz processor
- EDGE, Wi-Fi, Bluetooth, Infrared
