= I-mate =

Scottish telecommunications and computer software company

i-mate
- Industry: Telecommunications; Computer software
- Founded: Glasgow, Scotland in 2001
- Founder: James Morrison
- Headquarters: Dubai Internet City, Dubai, United Arab Emirates
- Area served: Worldwide
- Key people: James Morrison, CEO
- Products: Mobile phones Smartphones; Multimedia computers
- Services: Services and Software; Online services

i-mate is a company selling Windows Mobile-powered devices. The Group was launched by James Morrison, who began his telecoms career at sea designing and installing fiber optic cable systems with Cable & Wireless and was head of the team at O_{2} that designed the first O2 Xda Pocket PC phone and started Microsoft in the mobile software industry. He also selected HTC to be the OEM for the O2 XDA and started them in the mobile handset manufacturing business. He set up i-mate in Glasgow, Scotland in 2001 to deliver into the corporate market place. imate used HTC as their manufacturing partner for 22 handsets, It was based in Dubai, United Arab Emirates, and operated in the UK, Italy, Armenia, Australia, India, the U.S. and South Africa. Imate went on the London AIM Stock Market in November 2005 with a valuation of $350 million at flotation a climbed to a value of $989 Million in 2006, The company closed most of its business in September 2009.

James Morrison and i-mate were recognized as the innovators in the mobile handset industry but their demise in 2009 was brought on by the failure of Microsoft to develop their mobile operating system to keep up with Apple iOS and Android OS. HTC stopping being an OEM and becoming a competing brand. The company returned in 2013 with an announcement about a new mobile device that runs on Windows 8. The i-mate Intelligent which was supposed to be a 4.7-inch handset running the desktop OS on a Clover Trail CPU with 2 GB RAM and 64 GB storage, an alleged functioning prototype has never been shown to the public as of November 2017 and after MWC 2013 the device didn't make any further appearance one way or another.

In June 2011 it was found that James Morrison had permanently moved to the US and was now cleaning wheelie bins for a living.

== Products ==
From the beginning of its existence in 2001 until fall of 2006, imate sold branded versions of Pocket PCs, PPC phones, and smartphones manufactured by Taiwanese HTC. In September 2006, HTC ended this relationship with i-mate (at the same time it cut ties with O_{2}). This was announced soon after HTC started selling devices under its own brand name in Europe and purchased the PPC/smartphone distributor Dopod which serves Asia and Australia. Since the end of its relationship with HTC, i-mate carried devices from other manufacturers, including Inventec and TechFaith.
