= HTC 7 Trophy =

Smartphone manufactured by HTC

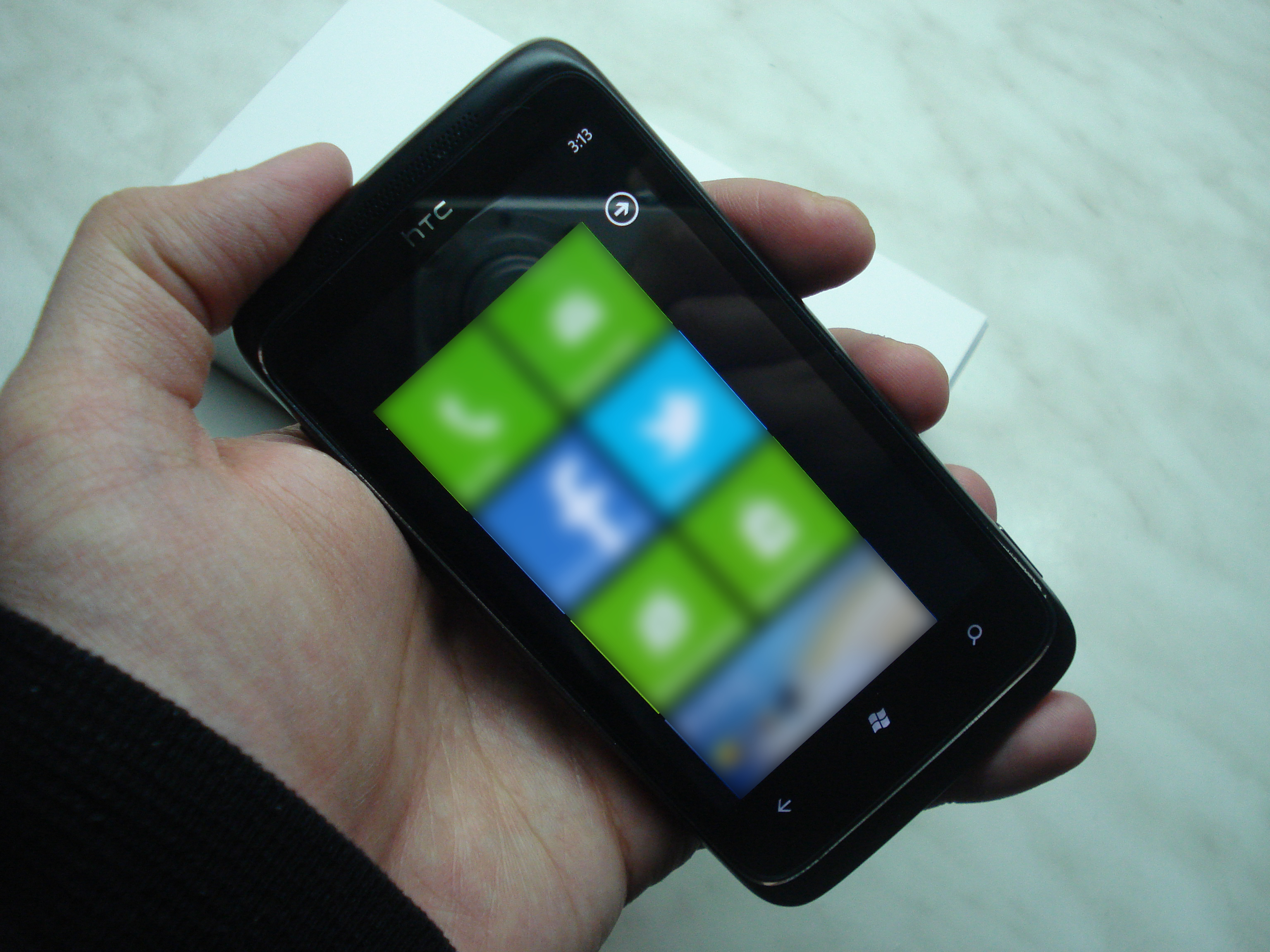
- A HTC Trophy running Windows Phone 7.
- Manufacturer: HTC Corporation
- Type: Smartphone
- Availability by region: May 26, 2011 - United States
- Discontinued: January 31, 2013
- Form factor: Slate smartphone
- Dimensions: 118.5 mm (4.67 in) (h); 65.5 mm (2.42 in) (w); 11.96 mm (0.47 in) (d)
- Weight: 140 g (4.94 oz)
- Operating system: Windows Phone 7
- CPU: Qualcomm QSD8250 1GHz Scorpion (Snapdragon); Qualcomm QSD8650 1GHz Scorpion (Snapdragon) on Verizon
- Memory: 576 MB RAM
- Storage: 512 MB ROM
- Removable storage: 16 GB internal micro SD Card on Verizon; 8 GB on other carriers
- Battery: 1300 mAh Lithium-ion or Lithium-ion polymer
- Rear camera: 5 megapixel autofocus with flash, rear-facing, with 720p video capture
- Front camera: None
- Display: 3.8-inch (diagonal) widescreen 480-by-800 WVGA
- Connectivity: CDMA EV-DO 800/1900, 2100 HSPA, WCDMA; 850/900/1800/1900 GSM, EDGE on Verizon Wireless; 900/2100 HSPA, WCDMA; 850/900/1800/1900 GSM, EDGE on all other carriers
- Data inputs: Multi-touch touchscreen display Dual microphone 3-axis accelerometer Digital compass Proximity sensor Ambient light sensor
- Development status: Available
- Hearing aid compatibility: M4/T4
- Other: Wi-Fi, FM-Radio, GPS

The HTC Trophy (referred to as the 7 Trophy in all countries except the US) is one of several Windows Phone handsets produced by HTC Corporation.

== History ==
In late 2008, a HTC roadmap leaked to the technology press featuring future HTC devices. One of these was labeled the HTC Trophy. A BlackBerry reminiscent phone, the device sported a 3-inch touchscreen with a portrait Qwerty keyboard and a trackball. For several years, this phone was not heard of again, largely due to the internal shakeups going on at Microsoft involving the move from Windows Mobile 7.0 to Windows Phone 7 Series (Later renamed Windows Phone 7), as well as problems with development of the KIN devices. When Microsoft announced its new mobile OS at Mobile World Congress 2010, most journalists assumed that the HTC Trophy had been abandoned. But a new model (codenamed HTC Spark) began to appear in leaked spy shots, and the phone was released as the HTC 7 Trophy to international markets on October 21, 2010. In January 2011, a leaked internal document to Microsoft employees appeared on Engadget's website. It offered the phone for $199.99 to Microsoft employees. Many took this to mean that the phone would soon be launching on Verizon's network. After several more leaks, Verizon announced the phone on May 19, 2011 to be available in early June.

It was discontinued by the end of January 2013.

== Product ==
=== Specifications ===
The Trophy features a 3.8" capacitive touchscreen display that is a WVGA LCD panel on international versions, and a WVGA SLCD panel on the US Verizon version. The phone has a 1 GHz Qualcomm Snapdragon processor (QSD8250) with 512 Mb of ROM and 576 Mb of RAM. International versions have 8 GB of built-in storage on a (non-user accessible) microSD card, while US versions have 16. Verizon has updated the Trophy smartphone with a new update to the HTC Trophy 8107. The updated will fixes a Gmail syncing issue, a location access issue, an email issue involving Microsoft Exchange Server 2003 and disappearing virtual keyboards.

=== International vs. US ===
In addition to having specification differences, the Trophy and 7 Trophy have slight design differences as well. The 7 Trophy features a bright yellow battery compartment (typical of HTC Windows Mobile devices in the past), whereas the Trophy has a bright red battery compartment (to acknowledge the phone's Verizon ties). Press images of the Verizon device also appear to show a small circular cutout beneath the battery door, and above the Windows Phone logo. This circle is an external antenna port cover.

== Reported problems from 1st release ==
- Slow memory
- Low quality screens
- Bubbles under the screen
- Backwards screen
- Low audio quality

== See also ==
- Windows Phone
