= HTC Desire series =

Series of Android smartphones

HTC Desire is a series of Android smartphones designed and manufactured by HTC. All products in the Desire series were designed to be affordable, touchscreen-based and slate-sized, and run the Android mobile operating system (Android 2.1 Eclair or subsequent Android releases) with the HTC Sense graphical user interface except for the HTC Desire 616, HTC Desire 516. HTC Desire 310 and HTC Desire 210, all of which feature a mixed user interface of HTC Sense and the Android Open Source Project.

== 2010 ==
- HTC Desire, the first ever phone in the Desire lineup
- HTC Desire HD, which included a larger and higher resolution screen
- HTC Desire Z, Released in November 2010, features a slide-out QWERTY keyboard

== 2011 ==
- HTC Desire S, the follow-up to the original HTC Desire

== 2012 ==
- HTC Desire C, a low-end device
- HTC Desire V, a larger screen, higher clock speed variant of the HTC Desire C
  - HTC Desire VC, a CDMA variant of the HTC Desire V
  - HTC Desire VT, another HTC Desire V variant for China
- HTC Desire X, similar to the HTC Desire V but with a faster, dual-core processor
- HTC Desire SV, has the same specs as the HTC Desire X but with a larger, 4.3 Inch screen
- HTC Desire 400, similar to the HTC Desire SV but with a 5 MP Camera and two SIM card slots
  - HTC Desire SU, a Chinese variant of the HTC Desire 400

== 2013 ==
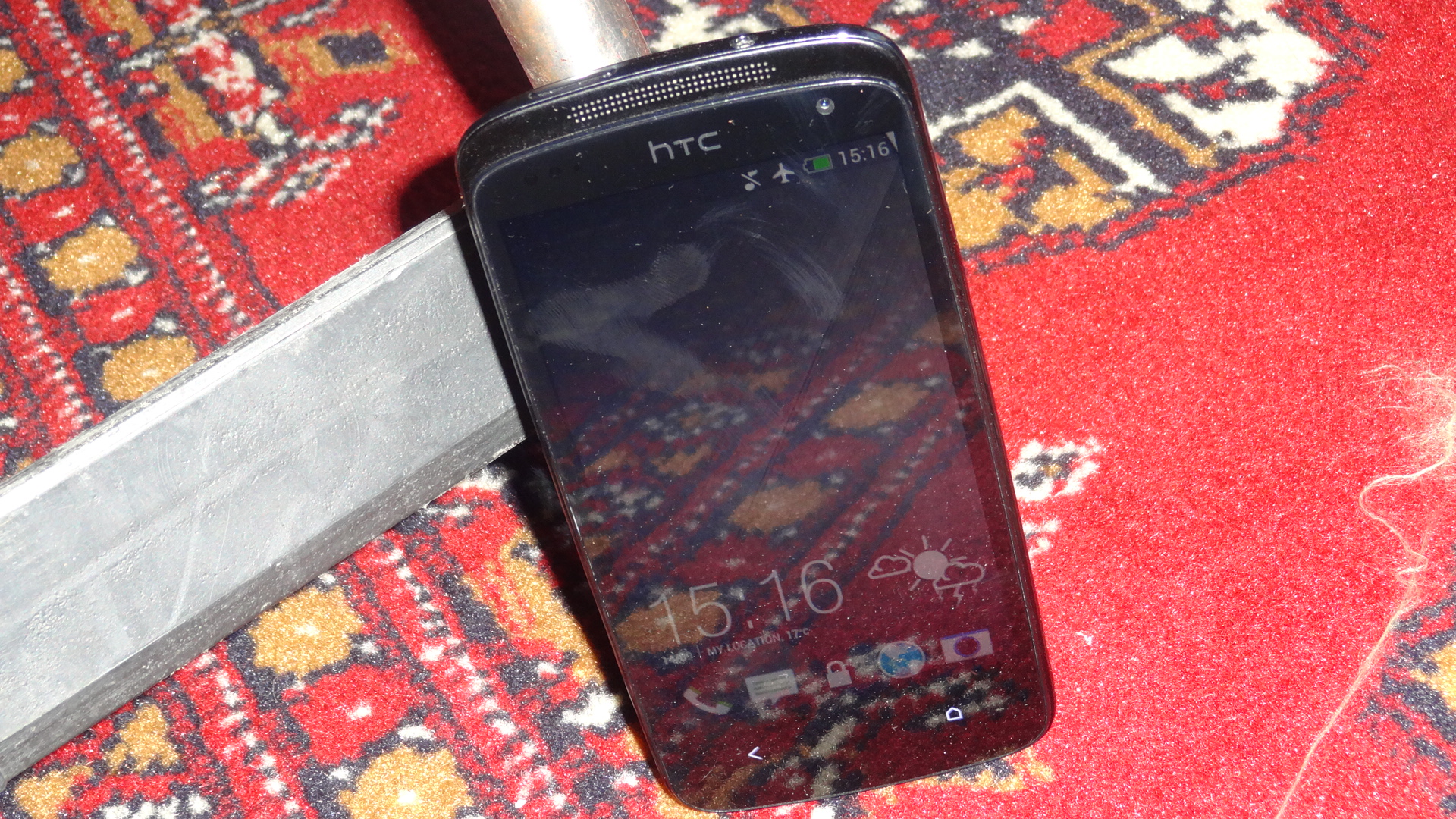
A black HTC Desire 500

- HTC Desire U, a low-end device released in China
- HTC Desire Q, another low-end device for China
- HTC Desire L, a lower mid-range device with a dual-core processor. Released in China
  - HTC Desire P, with the same specs as the HTC Desire L but with an 8 MP camera
- HTC Desire 600, a mid-range offering with a quad-core processor and two SIM card slots
- HTC Desire 200, a low-end phone available worldwide
- HTC Desire 500, similar to the HTC Desire 600 but with a smaller, 4.3 Inch screen
- HTC Desire 601, a higher mid-range device with LTE capabilities
- HTC Desire 300, a smaller variant of the HTC Desire 601 with a 4.3 Inch screen
- HTC Desire 700, a large 5 Inch mid-range phone with two SIM card slots
- HTC Desire 501, a lower mid-range device

== 2014 ==
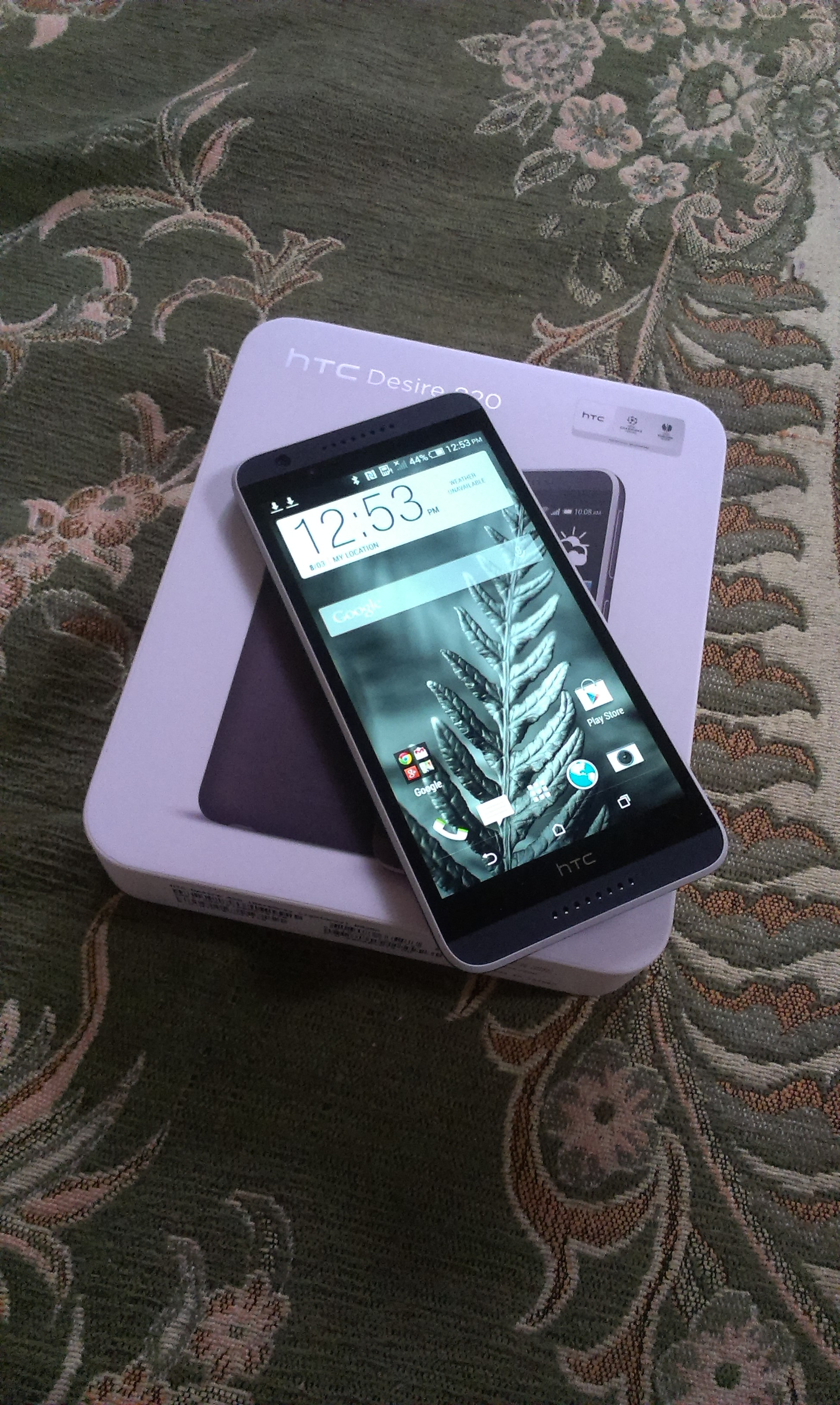
HTC Desire 820

- HTC Desire Eye, first Desire series phone with high-end flagship specs and a 13-megapixel front camera with a host of new camera features
- HTC Desire 828
- HTC Desire 820, improvement to the Desire 816
- HTC Desire 816, the first Phablet in the Desire line with higher mid-range specs
- HTC Desire 620, improvement to Desire 616
- HTC Desire 616, the first HTC device with an octa-core processor
- HTC Desire 610, a mid-ranger with a smaller 4.7 Inch screen
- HTC Desire 516, a similar phone to the Desire 610 but with the AOSP UI instead of HTC Sense
- HTC Desire 310, a budget device with a quad-core processor
- HTC Desire 210, a low-end device

== 2016 ==
- HTC Desire 10 Pro
- HTC Desire 10 Lifestyle
- HTC Desire 830
- HTC Desire 825
- HTC Desire 728 Ultra
- HTC Desire 650
- HTC Desire 628
- HTC Desire 625
- HTC Desire 530

== 2017 ==
- HTC Desire 10 Compact

== 2018 ==
- HTC Desire 12 comes with an affordable price tag.
- HTC Desire 12+
- HTC Desire 12s

== 2019 ==
- HTC Desire 19+
- HTC Desire 19s

== 2020 ==
- HTC Desire 20 Pro, Budgeted Desire smartphone for 2020.
- HTC Desire 20+, Another Desire series budget smartphone for 2020

== 2021 ==
- Desire 21 Pro 5G, First 5G smartphone in the 2021 HTC Desire series lineup with 90 Hz display.

== 2022 ==
- HTC Desire 22 Pro

== Comparison ==
This table is primarily intended to show the differences between the models of the Desire series:

	HTC Desire	HTC Desire HD	HTC Desire S	HTC Desire C	HTC Desire X	HTC Desire 300	HTC Desire 12 Plus	HTC Desire 500	HTC Desire 601	HTC Desire 700	HTC Desire 310	HTC Desire 610	HTC Desire 620	HTC Desire 616	HTC Desire 816
Dimensions	H 119 mm (4.69 in); W 60 mm (2.36 in); D 11.9 mm (0.47 in)	H 123 mm (4.84 in); W 68 mm (2.68 in); D 11.8 mm (0.46 in)	H 115 mm (4.53 in); W 59.8 mm (2.35 in); D 11.6 mm (0.46 in)	H 107.2 mm (4.22 in); W 60.6 mm (2.39 in); D 12.3 mm (0.48 in)	H 118.5 mm (4.67 in); W 62.3 mm (2.45 in); D 9.3 mm (0.37 in)	H 131.8 mm (5.19 in); W 66.2 mm (2.61 in); D 10.1 mm (0.40 in)	H 131.8 mm (5.19 in); W 66.9 mm (2.63 in); D 9.9 mm (0.39 in)	H 134.5 mm (5.30 in); W 66.7 mm (2.63 in); D 9.9 mm (0.39 in)	H 145.5 mm (5.73 in); W 72 mm (2.83 in); D 10.3 mm (0.41 in)	H 132.4 mm (5.21 in); W 68 mm (2.68 in); D 11.3 mm (0.44 in)	H 143.1 mm (5.63 in); W 70.5 mm (2.78 in); D 9.6 mm (0.38 in)	H 150.1 mm (5.91 in); W 72.7 mm (2.86 in); D 9.6 mm (0.38 in)	H 142 mm (5.59 in); W 71.9 mm (2.83 in); D 9.2 mm (0.36 in)	H 156.6 mm (6.17 in); W 78.7 mm (3.10 in); D 8 mm (0.31 in)	
Weight	135 grams with battery	164 grams with battery	130 grams with battery	100 grams with battery	114 grams with battery	120 grams with battery	123 grams with battery	130 grams with battery	149 grams with battery	140 grams with battery	143.5 grams with battery	145 grams with battery	150 grams with battery	165 grams with battery	
Operating System (OS)	Android 2.1 (Eclair), upgradeable to 2.2 (Froyo)	Android 2.2 (Froyo), upgradeable to 2.3 (Gingerbread)	Android 2.3 (Gingerbread), upgradeable to 4.0 (Ice Cream Sandwich)	Android 4.0 (Ice Cream Sandwich)	Android 4.0 (Ice Cream Sandwich), upgradeable to 4.1.1 (Jelly Bean)	Android 4.1.2 (Jelly Bean)		Android 4.2.2 (Jelly Bean), upgradeable to 4.4.2 (KitKat)	Android 4.1.2 (Jelly Bean)	Android 4.2.2 (Jelly Bean)	Android 4.4.2 (KitKat)	Android 4.4.4 (KitKat)	Android 4.2.2 (Jelly Bean)	Android 4.4.2 (KitKat)	
Display	3.7-inch WVGA (480×800) LCD Corning Gorilla Glass 1.0 252 ppi	4.3-inch WVGA (480×800) LCD Corning Gorilla Glass 1.0 217 ppi	3.7-inch WVGA (480×800) S-LCD Corning Gorilla Glass 1.0 252 ppi	3.5-inch HVGA (320×480) 165 ppi	4.0-inch WVGA (480×800) Super LCD 233 ppi	4.3-inch WVGA (480×800) TFT 217 ppi	4.3-inch WVGA (480×800) TFT 217 ppi	4.5-inch qHD (540×960) TFT Corning Gorilla Glass 2.0 245 ppi	5.0-inch qHD (540×960) 220 ppi	4.5-inch FWVGA (480×854) 218 ppi	4.7-inch qHD (540×960) 234 ppi	5.0-inch HD (720×180) 294 ppi	5.0-inch 720p (720×1280) 294 ppi	5.5-inch 720p (720×1280) 267 ppi	
SOC	Qualcomm QSD8250 Snapdragon S1	Qualcomm MSM8255 Snapdragon S2		Qualcomm MSM7225A Snapdragon S1	Qualcomm MSM8225 Snapdragon S4 Play		Qualcomm MSM8625Q Snapdragon 200	Qualcomm MSM8930AB Snapdragon 400	Qualcomm MSM8625Q Snapdragon 200	MediaTek MT6582M	Qualcomm MSM8926 Snapdragon 400	Qualcomm MSM8916 Snapdragon 410	MediaTek MT6592	Qualcomm MSM8928 Snapdragon 400	
CPU	1 GHz Qualcomm Scorpion			600 MHz ARM Cortex-A5	1 GHz dual-core ARM Cortex-A5		1.2 GHz quad-core ARM Cortex-A5	1.4 GHz dual-core Qualcomm Krait 300	1.2 GHz quad-core ARM Cortex-A5	1.3 GHz quad-core ARM Cortex-A7	1.2 GHz quad-core ARM Cortex-A7	1.2 GHz quad-core ARM Cortex-A53	1.4 GHz octa-core ARM Cortex-A7	1.6 GHz quad-core ARM Cortex-A7	
GPU	Qualcomm Adreno 200	Qualcomm Adreno 205		Qualcomm Adreno 200	Qualcomm Adreno 203			Qualcomm Adreno 305	Qualcomm Adreno 203	Mali 400-MP2	Qualcomm Adreno 305	Qualcomm Adreno 306	Mali 450-MP4	Qualcomm Adreno 305	
RAM	576 MB	768 MB		512 MB	768 MB	512 MB	1 GB							1.5 GB	
Storage	512 MB; Expansion slot: microSD memory card up to 32 GB	1.5 GB; Expansion slot: microSD memory card up to 32 GB	1.1 GB; Expansion slot: microSD memory card up to 32 GB	4 GB; Expansion slot: microSD memory card up to 32 GB		4 GB; Expansion slot: microSD memory card up to 64 GB		8 GB; Expansion slot: microSD memory card up to 64 GB		4 GB; Expansion slot: microSD memory card up to 32 GB	8 GB; Expansion slot: microSD memory card up to 128 GB		4 GB; Expansion slot: microSD memory card up to 32 GB	8 GB; Expansion slot: microSD memory card up to 128 GB	
2G GSM/GPRS/EDGE	850, 900, 1800, 1900 MHz														
3G WCDMA/HSPA	850, 900, 1900, 2100 MHz														
4G LTE	No							Yes	No		Yes		No	Yes	
Sensors	Accelerometer, ambient light, proximity, compass			Accelerometer, ambient light, proximity					Accelerometer, Ambient light, proximity, compass	Accelerometer, ambient light, proximity				Accelerometer, Ambient light, proximity, compass	
Connectivity	Wi-Fi: 802.11b/g, Wi-Fi hotspot (Android 2.2); Bluetooth 2.1; Standard 5-pin micro USB 2.0	Wi-Fi: 802.11b/g/n, Wi-Fi hotspot Bluetooth 2.1; Standard 5-pin micro USB 2.0		Wi-Fi: 802.11b/g/n, Wi-Fi hotspot Bluetooth 3.0; Standard 5-pin micro USB 2.0	Wi-Fi 802.11b/g/n, Wi-Fi hotspot Bluetooth 4.0 Smart Ready; Standard 5-pin micro USB 2.0			Wi-Fi 802.11a/b/g/n, Wi-Fi hotspot Bluetooth 4.0 Smart Ready; Standard 5-pin micro USB 2.0		Wi-Fi: 802.11b/g/n, Wi-Fi hotspot Bluetooth 4.0 Smart Ready; Standard 5-pin micro USB 2.0	Wi-Fi 802.11b/g/n, Wi-Fi hotspot Bluetooth 4.0 Smart Ready; Standard 5-pin micro USB 2.0	3.5 mm stereo audio jack, Bluetooth® 4.0 aptX™ enabled, DLNA® for wirelessly streaming media from the phone to a compatible TV or computer, HTC Connect™, micro-USB 2.0 port	Wi-Fi 802.11b/g/n, Wi-Fi hotspot Bluetooth 4.0 Smart Ready; Standard 5-pin micro USB 2.0		
Camera	5 MP (2592×1944) with LED flash 720p HD video recording (via software update); No front camera	8 MP (3264×2448) with dual LED flash 720p HD video recording No front camera	5 MP (2592×1944) with LED flash 720p HD video recording 0.3 MP front camera	5 MP (2592×1944); 480p video recording No front camera	5 MP (2592×1944) with LED flash 480p video recording No front camera	5 MP (2592×1944); WVGA video recording 0.3 MP front camera	8 MP (3264×2448) with LED flash 720p HD video recording 1.6 MP front camera	5 MP (2592×1944) with LED flash 1080p HD video recording 0.3 MP front camera	8 MP (3264×2448) with LED flash 1080p HD video recording 2.1 MP front camera	5 MP (2592×1944); 1080p HD video recording 0.3 MP front camera	8 MP (3264×2448) with LED flash 1080p HD video recording 1.3 MP front camera, 720p HD video recording	8 MP (3264×2448) with LED flash 1080p HD video recording 5 MP front camera, 1080p HD video recording	8 MP (3264×2448) with LED flash 1080p HD video recording 2 MP front camera, 720p HD video recording	13 MP (4160×3120) with LED flash 1080p HD video recording 5 MP front camera, 1080p HD video recording	
Battery	1400 mAh	1230 mAh	1450 mAh	1230 mAh	1650 mAh		1800 mAh	2100 mAh		2000 mAh	2040 mAh	2100 mAh	2000 mAh	2600 mAh	
