= Wildfire (disambiguation) =

Wildfire is a fire in an area of combustible vegetation that occurs in the countryside or rural areas.

Wildfire or Wild Fire may also refer to:

== Arts, entertainment, and media ==
=== Fictional entities ===
- Wildfire (Drake Burroughs), a DC Comics superhero and member of the Legion of Super-Heroes
- Wildfire (Carol Vance Martin), a Quality Comics female superhero from the 1940s
- Wildfire, a flammable substance similar to Greek fire, featured in George R. R. Martin's fantasy novel series A Song of Ice and Fire, and its TV adaptation Game of Thrones
- Wildfire, a spaceship capable of crossing universes in the British TV series Red Dwarf
- Wildfire, a biological facility in The Andromeda Strain
- Wildfire, a playable "Trap Master" character in Skylanders: Trap Team

=== Films ===
- Wild Fire (野火), a 1957 Mandarin-language Hong Kong film directed by Chang Cheh
- Wildfire (1915 film), an American drama produced by the Shuberts
- Wildfire (1925 film), an American drama directed by T. Hayes Hunter
- Wildfire (1944 film), a Hungarian historical drama
- Wildfire (1945 film), an American film directed by Robert Emmett Tansey
- Wildfire (1988 film), an American film directed by Zalman King
- Wildfire (2020 film), an Irish drama thriller directed by Cathy Brady

=== Gaming ===
- WildFire (2016), a 3D MOBA video game developed by NetEase Inception Studios
- Jagged Alliance 2: Wildfire, a mod for the computer game Jagged Alliance 2
- Sonic Wild Fire, the former name for the Sonic and the Secret Rings video game for the Nintendo Wii
- WildFire For NX, a spiritual successor to the Disaster: Day of Crisis video game for the Nintendo Wii
- Wildfire Games, a freeware hobbyist game developer studio

=== Literature ===
- Wild Fire (novel), a 2006 novel by Nelson DeMille
- Wildfire, a 1986 romance novel by Alexandra Scott, published by Harlequin
- Wildfire, the Story of a Wild Horse novel by Zane Grey made into a film When Romance Rides (1922)
- Wildfire, an imprint of the publisher Headline Publishing Group

=== Music ===
==== Groups ====
- Wild Fire (band), an American hard rock band
- Wildfire Manwurrk, an Indigenous Australian hard rock band

==== Albums ====
- Wild Fire (album), a 1971 album by Rusty Bryant
- Wild Fire, a 1985 album by John Holt
- Wildfire (Rachel Platten album), 2016
- Wildfire (Loreen album), 2026
- Wildfire, the working title for Julianne Hough's unreleased second album

==== Songs ====
- "Wildfire" (Michael Martin Murphey song), 1975
- "Wildfire" (SBTRKT song), 2011
- "Wildfire" (Crowder song), 2018
- "The Wildfire (If It Was True)", by Mando Diao, 2007
- "Wildfire", a song by 311 on the album Mosaic
- "Wildfire", a song by Bad Wolves on Dear Monsters
- "Wildfire", a song by Blink-182 on California
- "Wildfire", a song by Budgie from their EP If Swallowed, Do Not Induce Vomiting
- "Wildfire", a song by The Coral on The Coral
- "Wildfire", a song by Crossfaith featuring Benji Webbe of Skindred on Xeno
- "Wildfire", a song by HammerFall on (r)Evolution
- "Wildfire", a song by In Hearts Wake on Skydancer
- "Wildfire", a song by Demi Lovato from Confident
- "Wildfire", a song by John Mayer on his album Paradise Valley
- "Wildfire", a song by Marianas Trench from Astoria
- "Wildfire", a song by Monsta X on the EP Shape of Love
- "Wildfire", a song by P.O.D. on Payable on Death
- "Wildfire", a song by Periphery from Periphery V: Djent Is Not a Genre
- "Wildfire", a song by Ben Rector on The Walking in Between
- "Wildfire", a song by Sabbat from Dreamweaver
- "Wildfire", a song by Sara Evans on Stronger
- "Wildfires", a song by Sault on Untitled (Black Is)
- "Wildfire", a song by Sonata Arctica on Reckoning Night
  - "Wildfire, Part: II - One With the Mountain" and "Part: III - Wildfire Town, Population: 0", sequels to the Sonata Arctica song in Stones Grow Her Name
- "Wildfire", a song by Tinashe from Aquarius
- "Wildfire", a song by Watchhouse on the album Blindfaller
- "Wildfire", a song by While She Sleeps from Self Hell
- "Wildfire", a song by Zac Brown Band on Jekyll + Hyde

=== Television ===
- Wildfire (1986 TV series), an animated series produced by Hanna-Barbera in 1986
- Wildfire (2005 TV series), an American television drama series on ABC Family
- Wildfire (2025 TV series), a Canadian documentary series
- "Wildfire" (The Walking Dead), an episode of the television series The Walking Dead
- "Wild Fire", an episode of the television series The Burning Zone

== Roller coasters ==
- Wildfire (Kolmården Wildlife Park), a roller coaster at Kolmården Wildlife Park in Bråviken, Sweden
- Wildfire (Silver Dollar City), a roller coaster in Silver Dollar City, Missouri

== Technology ==
- Wildfire, an XMPP server, the old name of Openfire
- Wildfire, a graphics and animation software application for AmigaOS computers
- HTC Wildfire, an Android OS smartphone made by HTC Corporation
- HTC Wildfire S, an updated version of the HTC Wildfire smartphone
- Wildfire 5.0, one name for the CAD/CAM/CAE software called Pro/ENGINEER
- Wildfire Communications Inc, a voice communications startup that was sold to Orange
- Wildfire Interactive Inc, a social marketing application that was sold to Google

== Transportation ==
- Wild Fire, a type of rocket vehicle designed by the da Vinci Project
- Wildfire (motor company), manufacturers of small-engine and electric vehicles
- Wildfire, a slave ship arrested off the Florida coast by the U.S. Navy in 1860
- Woodill Wildfire, an American sports car

== Other uses ==
- Miliaria profunda, the most severe form of the miliaria skin disease, sometimes referred to as "wildfire"
- "Wildfire", Chippewa name of sculptor Edmonia Lewis (c. 1844–1907)
- Frank Schulte (1882–1949), baseball player, nicknamed "Wildfire"

== See also ==
- Wyldfire, a dating app introduced in 2014
