= HTC Desire 820q dual sim =

- Brand: HTC
- Manufacturer: HTC
- Type: Touchscreen smartphone
- Series: Desire
- First released: October 2014
- Availability by region: October 2014
- Predecessor: HTC Desire 816
- Successor: HTC Desire 826
- Related: HTC Desire 820
- Form factor: Slate
- Dimensions: 157.7 mm (6.21 in) H 78.7 mm (3.10 in) W 7.7 mm (0.30 in) D
- Weight: 155 g (5 oz)
- Operating system: Android 4.4.4 "KitKat"
- System-on-chip: Qualcomm MSM8916 Snapdragon 410
- CPU: Quad-core 1.2 GHz Cortex-A53
- GPU: Adreno 306
- Memory: 1 GB RAM
- Storage: 16 GB
- Removable storage: microSD, up to 128 GB
- Battery: 2600 mAh Non-removable Li-Po
- Rear camera: 13 MP with LED flash
- Front camera: 8 MP
- Display: 5.5 in (140 mm) diagonal TFT; 1280x720 px
- Sound: HTC Boomsound
- Connectivity: Wi-Fi 802.11 a/b/g/n, dual-band, Wi-Fi Direct; DLNA; A-GPS; Bluetooth 4.0 A2DP, apt-X; Micro USB 2.0
- Data inputs: Multi-touch, capacitive touchscreen

HTC Desire 820q dual sim is a mid range Android-based smartphone designed and manufactured by HTC launched in October 2014. The phone belongs to HTC Desire family and was launched as a degraded variant of HTC Desire 820.
