= HTC Desire 310 =

2014 Android-based smartphone by HTC

- Manufacturer: HTC
- Type: Smartphone
- First released: March 2014
- Predecessor: HTC Desire 300
- Successor: HTC Desire 320
- Related: HTC Desire 210, HTC Desire 610, HTC Desire 816
- Form factor: Slate
- Operating system: Android 4.2 "Jelly Bean"
- System-on-chip: MediaTek
- CPU: 1.3 GHz
- Memory: 1 GB
- Storage: 4 GB
- Removable storage: microSD
- Battery: 2000mAh
- Rear camera: 5.0MP
- Front camera: 300kP
- Display: 4.5" 854x480
- Connectivity: List: Wi-Fi; Bluetooth 4.0; USB

The HTC Desire 310 is an Android-based smartphone designed, developed and manufactured by HTC. The dual-SIM phone is powered by 1.3 GHz quad-core processor, and has a 4.5-inch screen. The Desire 310 is an entry-level smartphone running Android 4.2 Jelly Bean. The phone features a 1.3 GHz quad-core processor and 1 GB RAM.

== See also ==
- HTC Desire 610
- HTC Desire 816
