= HTC Desire 620 =

2013 Android-based smartphone by HTC

- Manufacturer: HTC
- Type: Smartphone
- Series: HTC Desire series
- First released: 2014 Dec
- Availability by region: 2014 Dec
- Predecessor: HTC Desire 610
- Successor: HTC Desire 626
- Related: HTC Desire 620G, HTC Desire 616
- Form factor: Slate
- Dimensions: 150.1 mm (5.91 in) H 72.7 mm (2.86 in) W 9.6 mm (0.38 in) D
- Weight: 145 g (5.1 oz)
- Operating system: Android 4.4.4 KitKat
- System-on-chip: Qualcomm Snapdragon 410
- CPU: Quad-core 1.2 GHz ARM Cortex-A53
- GPU: Adreno 306
- Memory: 1 GB RAM
- Storage: 8 GB
- Removable storage: up to 128 GB microSD
- Battery: 2,100 mAh Li-Po
- Rear camera: 8-megapixel BSI camera with autofocus, 1x LED flash, f/2.4 aperture, 28 mm lens, 1080p video recording
- Front camera: 5-megapixel BSI camera, f/2.4 aperture, 1080p video recording
- Display: 5.0 in (130 mm) Super LCD 720 x 1280 pixels (294 ppi)
- Sound: Dual front-facing speakers
- Connectivity: Wi-Fi 802.11 b/g/n Bluetooth 4.0; GPS; 3.5 mm headphone jack microUSB
- Data inputs: List: Ambient Light Sensor; Proximity Sensor; Motion G Sensor
- Website: www.htc.com/sea/smartphones/htc-desire-620/

The HTC Desire 620 is an Android-based smartphone designed and manufactured by HTC. It is part of the Desire range of mid-range handsets. It was announced on 29 November 2014 in Taiwan. It was announced for the European market on 9 December 2014.

== Specifications ==
=== Design ===
The HTC Desire 620 has a 5 inch display with sizable bezels; there is a front-facing camera, a speaker grill and sensors at the upper bezel of the display while there is an "HTC" logo and a speaker grill at the lower bezel of the display. On the side frame; there is a volume rocker and a power button at the right side, there is a 3.5 mm headphone jack at the top and there is a microUSB port and a microphone hole at the bottom; the left side is empty. The rear-facing camera is located at the back with the LED flash right under it. It has a removable back cover with an "HTC" logo; removing the back cover reveals a removable battery, a microSD card slot and a SIM card slot.

The phone measures 150.1 x 72.7 x 9.6 mm and weighs 160 grams. It is available in white, gray, gray with orange accents, gray with blue accents and white with orange accents.

=== Hardware ===
The HTC Desire 620 is powered by Qualcomm Snapdragon 410 system-on-chip with a 1.2 GHz quad-core ARM Cortex-A53 64-bit CPU and Adreno 306 GPU. It comes with 1 GB RAM and 8 GB internal storage expandable up to 128 GB through the microSD card slot.

The phone has a 5-inch LCD with 720x1280 pixels resolution and 294 ppi pixel density. It has dual front-facing speakers.

The phone comes with an 8 megapixel back-mounted BSI camera with 1080p video recording. There is also a 5 megapixel front-mounted BSI camera with 1080p video recording.

The device has a 2100mAh removable lithium polymer battery.

The phone has Wi-Fi 802.11 b/g/n, Bluetooth 4.0, microUSB and GPS. It also supports LTE connectivity.

=== Software ===
The HTC Desire 620 runs on Android 4.4 KitKat with HTC's Sense UI 6 out of the box.

== Variants ==
There are 2 versions of the HTC Desire 620: Desire 620 with single SIM support and Desire 620G with dual SIM support. Although these two models have similar specifications, there are some differences; Desire 620G uses MediaTek MT6592 system-on-chip with a 1.7 GHz octa-core ARM Cortex-A7 32-bit CPU and ARM Mali-450 MP4 GPU instead of the Qualcomm Snapdragon 410 system-on-chip, lacks LTE (4G) connectivity and has microSD card support up to 32 GB instead of 128 GB.

== See also ==
- Comparison of HTC devices
