= HTC Explorer =

Smartphone manufactured by HTC

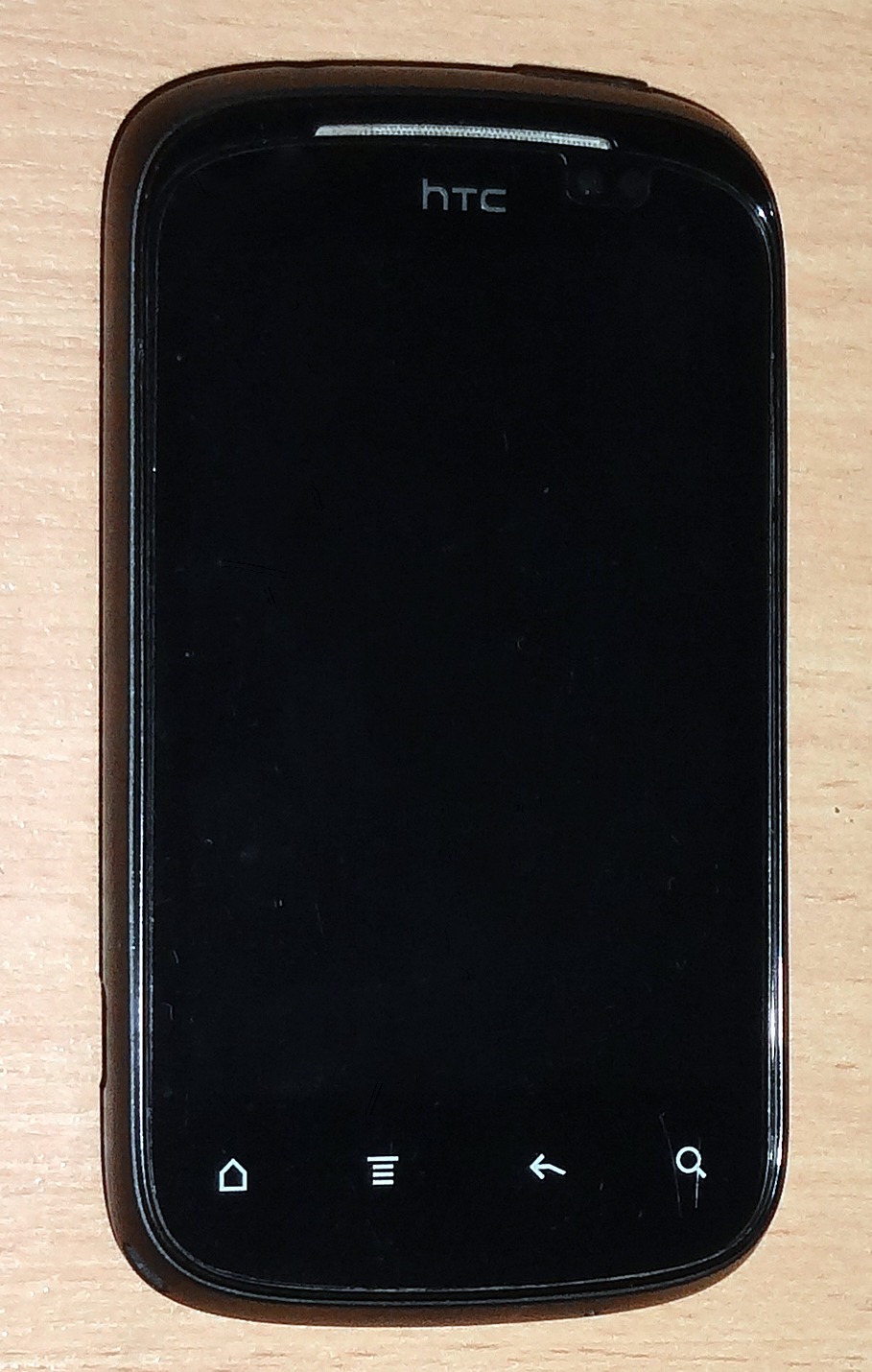
- Manufacturer: HTC Corporation
- Successor: HTC Desire C
- Related: HTC Wildfire S, HTC Wildfire
- Operating system: Android 2.3.5 (Gingerbread) with HTC Sense 3.5
- CPU: Qualcomm MSM7225A Snapdragon 600 MHz processor Adreno 200 GPU
- Memory: 512 MB RAM (418 MB usable), 150 MB ROM (90 MB usable)
- Removable storage: Supports up to 32 GB microSD
- Battery: Li-Ion 1230 mAh
- Rear camera: 3.15-Megapixel fixed-focus with geo-tagging and face detection
- Display: 3.2 in (8.1 cm) TFT LCD 320 × 480 capacitive touchscreen
- Connectivity: Bluetooth v3.0, microUSB v2.0
- Data inputs: Multi-touch with HTC Sense interface

The HTC Explorer, code-named Pico, is a smartphone developed by the HTC Corporation that was released in October 2011. Because of the low end processor, the HTC Watch movie rental service and the 3D scrolling effects on the home screens were not available. The handset was available in four varieties of color options. Visually similar to the HTC Wildfire S, it comes with a 3.2-inch screen, a 600 MHz ARMv7 Qualcomm Snapdragon processor and runs Android version 2.3 (Gingerbread), bundled with the proprietary HTC Sense 3.5 user interface.

== Features ==
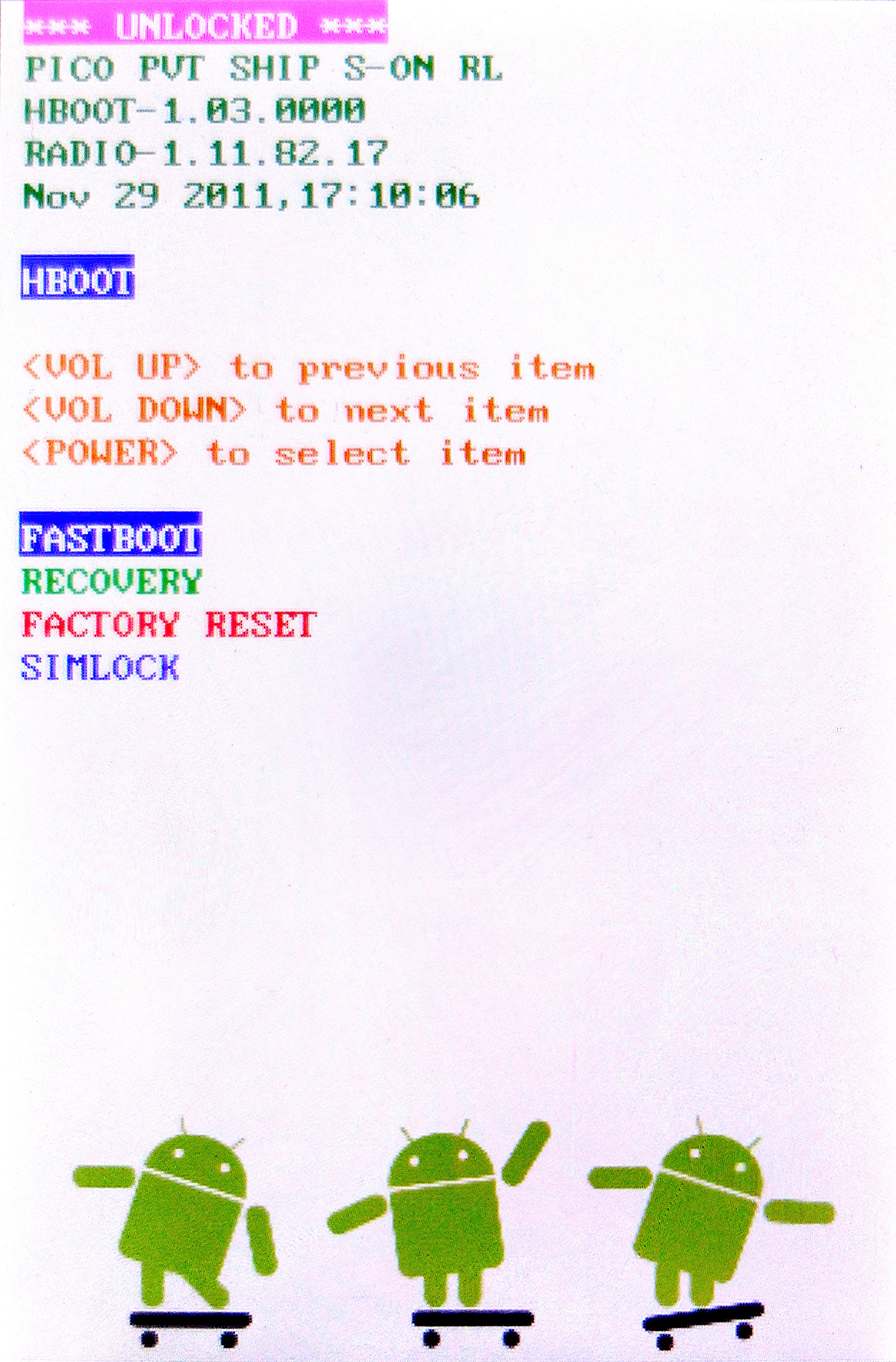
An unlocked bootloader of HTC Explorer

=== Software ===
HTC Explorer is considered a low-end smartphone, due to its comparatively low specifications. It offered Android 2.3 Gingerbread, with proprietary HTC Sense 3.5 custom graphical user interface by the manufacturer. The Explorer has an unlockable bootloader, allowing users from the outset to further develop the OS and "root" the device, or gain legitimate privileged control in Android's subsystem. Software-development community XDA-Developers was among the first to release a custom ROM and kernel for the phone, and since then the phone can unofficially be upgraded to newer versions of the Android OS family and other aftermarket versions. HTC Explorer has achieved unofficial stable builds of CyanogenMod 10.2 (Android 4.3) and CyanogenMod 11 (Android 4.4), and a boot-able version of Firefox OS

=== Hardware ===
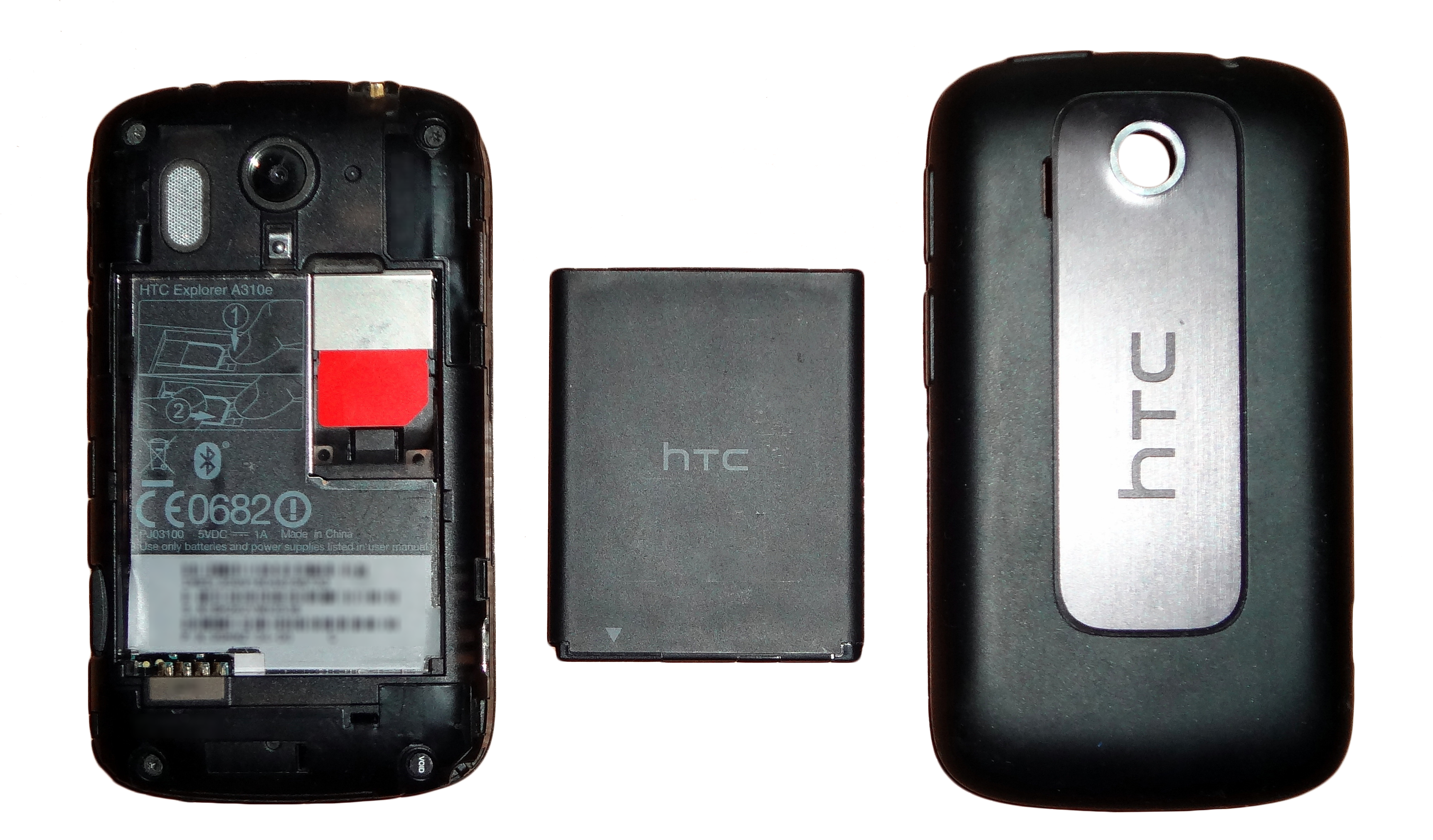
HTC Explorer with the back cover removed

The Explorer has a plastic chassis that is 4.05 in (102.8 mm) long, 2.25 in (57.2 mm) wide, and 0.51 in (12.9 mm) thick, and weighs 3.81 (108 g). The screen is a 3.2-inch TFT capacitive touchscreen, supporting 256K colors and around 180 pixel-per-inch density. The device features a 600 MHz Cortex-A5 single-core central processing unit (CPU) and a single-core Adreno 200 graphics processing unit (GPU), in conjunction with an accelerometer and proximity sensor. Other features include a microphone, GPS, and 3.15-megapixel rear camera. HTC Explorer has 512MB Ram and removable Li-ion 1230 mAh battery. The Phone was announced in September 2011 and released in October 2011. The rear of the Explorer features a patterned plastic surface with a rubbery, leathery texture to help users to grip and hold the device, with an additional plate of brushed metal at the center of the rear cover.

== See also ==
- Comparison of HTC devices
