= HTC Desire 626 =

Android smartphone

HTC Desire 626 HTC Desire 626g+ HTC Desire 626s
- Developer: HTC
- Type: Smartphone
- Series: Desire
- First released: August 27, 2015; 11 years ago
- Availability by region: 2015-2018
- Discontinued: 2018
- Related: HTC Desire 826
- Dimensions: 146.9 mm (5.78 in) H 70.9 mm (2.79 in) W 8.2 mm (0.32 in) D
- Weight: 140 g (4.9 oz)
- Operating system: Original: Android 4.4.4 KitKat; Current: Android 5.1.0 Lollipop 626s: Original: Android 5.1 Lollipop; Current: Android 6.0 Marshmallow
- System-on-chip: Qualcomm Snapdragon 210; Qualcomm Snapdragon 410; MediaTek MT6752
- CPU: 1.1 GHz quad-core ARM Cortex-A7 (210); 1.2 GHz quad-core ARM Cortex-A53 (410); 1.7 GHz octa-core ARM Cortex-A53 (MT6752)
- GPU: Adreno 304 (210); Adreno 306 (410); ARM Mali-T760 MP2 (MT6752)
- Memory: 1 GB LPDDR2 RAM (410); 1.5 GB LPDDR2 RAM (210); 2 GB RAM (MT6752)
- Storage: 8 or 16 GB
- Removable storage: Up to 32 GB
- Rear camera: 13 MP with LED flash, 1080p video at 30fps, f/2.0 aperture 626s: 8 MP with 720p video at 30fps
- Front camera: 5 MP, 720p video 626s: 2 MP
- Display: 5 in (130 mm); 720 x 1280 pixels (294 ppi)
- Connectivity: Wi-Fi: 802.11 b/g/n GPS with A-GPS; Bluetooth 4.0 with aptX; 626s: Bluetooth 4.1; DLNA microUSB 2.0 for charging
- Development status: Discontinued
- Other: Accelerometer, compass, proximity sensor

The HTC Desire 626 is a mid-range Android smartphone released by HTC in 2015. It comes in single SIM and dual SIM models.

== Specifications ==
=== Design ===
The HTC Desire 626 has a plastic unibody design.

The phone has a 5.0 inch display with sizable bezels; there is a front-facing camera, an earpiece grill and sensors on the upper bezel of the display while there is an "HTC" logo and a speaker grill at the lower bezel of the display.

The side frame is wrapped by a colored stripe. On the side frame; there is a SIM card/microSD card tray at the left, there is a power button and a volume rocker at the right, there is a 3.5 mm headphone jack at the top and there is a microUSB port at the bottom.

The back panel is made of plastic and is not removable. There is a rear-facing camera, an LED flash and an "HTC" logo at the back.

The phone measures 146.9 x 70.9 x 8.2 mm and weighs 139 grams. It is available in dark blue and white.

=== Hardware ===
The HTC Desire 626 is powered by Qualcomm Snapdragon 410 system-on-chip with a 1.2 GHz quad-core ARM Cortex-A53 64-bit CPU and Adreno 306 GPU. It comes with 1 GB RAM and 16 GB internal storage expandable through the microSD card slot.

The phone has a 5.0 inch Super LCD 3 display with 720x1280 pixels (HD) resolution and 294 ppi pixel density.

The phone has a 13 MP BSI rear camera sensor with f/2.2 aperture and a 5 MP front-facing camera; both of the cameras are capable of 1080p video recording at 30 fps.

The phone has a 2000 mAh non-removable battery.

=== Software ===
The HTC Desire 626 runs on Android 4.4 KitKat with HTC's Sense user interface out of the box. It is upgradable to Android 5.1.1 Lollipop.

== Variations ==
On 9 February 2015, HTC Desire 626 was announced in Taiwan. On 13 February 2015, rumors that claim this model of the HTC Desire 626 was also going to be sold by the American carrier Sprint emerged.

On 12 August 2015, American carrier Verizon announced that they were going to sell the HTC Desire 626. However, this model has significantly different specifications; it has Qualcomm Snapdragon 210 system-on-chip with a 1.1 GHz quad-core ARM Cortex-A7 32-bit CPU and Adreno 304 GPU instead of the Qualcomm Snadragon 410 system-on-chip, 1.5 GB RAM instead of 1 GB, 8 GB internal storage instead of 16 GB and an 8 MP rear camera instead of the 13 MP unit. This model was put on sale on 27 August 2015 for 192 USD. This model was also sold by AT&T.

On 5 February 2016, a new Dual SIM model of the HTC Desire 626 was released in India with different specifications. This model has MediaTek MT6752 system-on-chip with a 1.7 GHz octa-core ARM Cortex-A53 64-bit CPU and ARM Mali-T760 MP2 GPU instead of the Qualcomm Snapdragon 410 system-on-chip and 2 GB RAM instead of 1 GB. It is available in Blue Lagoon and White Birch. It was priced at 14990 INR.

== Desire 626s ==
The HTC Desire 626s is an Android-powered smartphone manufactured by HTC. It is available on Cricket (a subsidiary of AT&T), T-Mobile, MetroPCS (a T-Mobile subsidiary), Sprint Prepaid, and Virgin Mobile (a Sprint subsidiary) in the United States. The phone was announced in July 2015. It is considered the "budget" version of the Desire 626. The phone has a 5-inch screen with 720p resolution. It comes with a 8MP rear camera with 720p video recording and 2MP front camera. The phone is shipped with Android 5.1 "Lollipop" but can be upgraded to Android 6.0 "Marshmallow".

== Reception ==
The HTC Desire 626 was reviewed by several media outlets. The phone was generally considered as a rival to Moto G.

John V. from PhoneArena reviewed the AT&T version of the device and gave it 7 points out of 10. Low price, the design, the call quality and expandable storage was considered as the pros of the device. However; the quality of 720p video recording, inadequate performance for heavier tasks, speaker quality and white balance of the camera were criticized.

Bailey Stein from Android Authority reviewed the AT&T version of the device, giving it 3.5 stars out of five. The design, the camera quality for the class, the software experience and the low price were praised, however; the performance, below average battery life, software-based display sharpening and high amount of preinstalled bloatware were criticized.

Jessica Dolcourt from CNET reviewed the AT&T model of the device and gave it 6 points out of 10. She praised the design, the call quality but criticized the inconsistent camera quality, the weak performance and the weak automatic brightness. She concluded that the HTC Desire 626 was "one of the best-looking phones for the price" but the competitors offered more performance for the price.

Valentina Palladino from Tom's Guide reviewed the AT&T model of the device, giving it 2.5 stars out of 5. She praised the brightness of the display, the design and sharpness of the rear camera but criticized the battery life. She concluded that the Moto G was a better option.
