= HTC Desire C =

Android smartphone

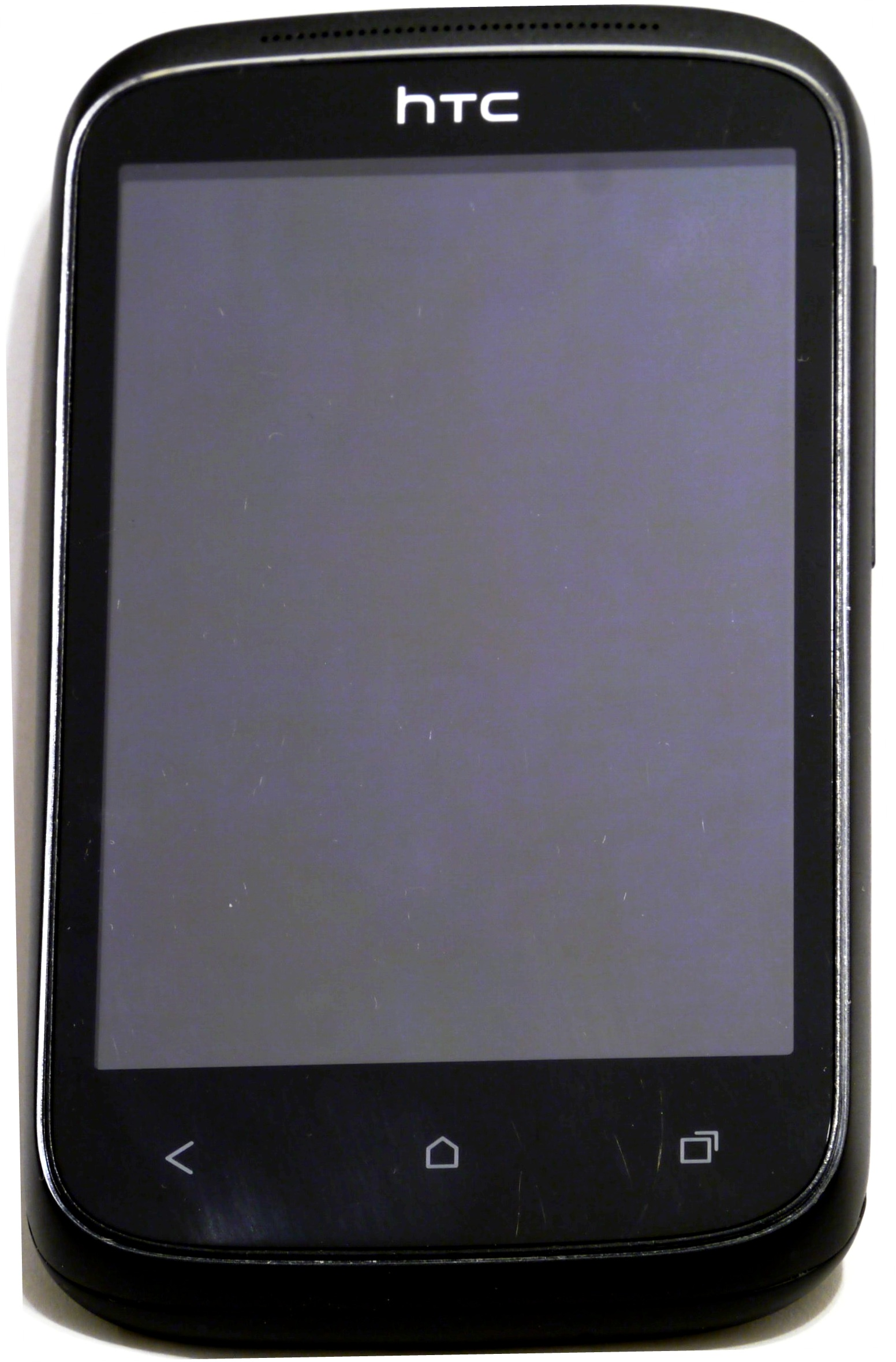
- Manufacturer: HTC Corporation
- Type: Smartphone
- Series: Desire
- Predecessor: HTC Explorer, HTC Wildfire S
- Successor: HTC Desire 200, HTC Desire 300
- Related: HTC Desire, HTC Wildfire
- Form factor: Slate
- Dimensions: 107.2×60.6×11.95 mm (4.220×2.386×0.470 in)
- Weight: 98 g (3.5 oz)
- Operating system: Android 4.0.3 with HTC Sense 4.0a, unofficially upgradable to Android 5.0 via Cyanogenmod
- CPU: GSM - 600 MHz Single-core Qualcomm Snapdragon S1 (MSM7225A); CDMA - 1 GHz Single-core Qualcomm Snapdragon S2 (MSM8655)
- Memory: 512 MB RAM
- Storage: 4GB
- Removable storage: microSD
- SIM: Mini SIM
- Battery: Removable 1230 mAh Li-ion (BL01100)
- Rear camera: 5 MP
- Front camera: No
- Display: 3.5 in (89 mm) 320×480 pixels, TFT
- Media: aac, .amr, .ogg, .m4a, .mid, .mp3, .wav, .wma
- Connectivity: 2G: 850 900 1800 1900 MHz; 3G: 850 900 1900 2100 MHz; HSDPA: 14.4 Mbps; Wi-Fi: 802.11b/g/n CDMA: 850 1700 1900 MHz; Bluetooth: v4.0 with apt-x enabled
- Data inputs: Multi-touch capacitive touchscreen, proximity sensor, ambient light sensor, G-Sensor

The HTC Desire C (codenamed Golfu (GSM) or Golfc (CDMA)) is an Android smartphone manufactured by HTC. It is an entry-level device, the Desire C is also patterned off other low-end HTC phones such as the Explorer and Wildfire S with 512 MB of RAM and a 600 MHz processor (can be overclocked to 844mhz via CM Performance), but with features from later HTC devices such as the One X including a similar design, Android 4.0 and Sense 4.0a, Beats Audio, and support for NFC. The Desire C is available in three different colours—black, white, and red.

== Availability ==
The HTC Desire C was released on several carriers in the United Kingdom in June 2012, such as 3, T-Mobile and Orange. In July 2012, Virgin Mobile and SaskTel became the first Canadian carriers to offer the Desire C.

The Desire C is also available on Cricket Wireless in the US, with a 1 GHz processor and CDMA technology instead of GSM.

== Model variants ==
There are model variants of HTC Desire C:

- H1000C - CDMA variant for Cricket Wireless
- PL01100 - Europe/Asia A320e variant
- PL01110 - A320eN variant with NFC
- PL01120 - Unknown GSM variant?
- PL01130 - Americas A320a variant
- PL01140 - China A320c variant
- PL01150 - Australian A320b variant
- PL01200 - CDMA variant for Cricket Wireless (Cricket Muve)
- PL01210 - Unknown CDMA variant?
