= HTC Desire 22 Pro =

Android-based smartphones produced by HTC

- Brand: HTC
- Manufacturer: HTC
- Type: Phablet
- Series: Desire
- First released: July 1, 2022; 4 years ago
- Predecessor: HTC Desire 21 Pro 5G
- Compatible networks: 3G, 4G and 5G
- Form factor: Slate
- Dimensions: 166.3 mm (6.55 in) H 76.9 mm (3.03 in) W 9.4 mm (0.37 in) D
- Weight: 205.5 g (7.25 oz)
- CPU: Snapdragon 695
- GPU: Adreno 619
- Memory: 8 GB
- Storage: 128 GB
- Removable storage: yes
- Battery: 4250 mAh
- Charging: Fast charging 18W; Wireless charging Reverse charging
- Sound: Loudspeaker
- Water resistance: IP 67
- Model: 22 Pro

HTC Desire 22 Pro is an Android-based smartphone manufactured by HTC. The phone was announced in June 2022.

== Design ==
The display of the phone is protected by Corning Gorilla Glass. The back panel is made from ceramic. It has IP67 rating for water and dust protection. The colour options are Wave Gold and Starry Night Black.

== Hardware ==
It uses the Snapdragon 695 chipset and offers UFS 3.1 with expandable storage. It comes in a single 8 GB+128 GB configuration. The phone has 6.6-inch full-HD+ (1080×2412 pixels) display with a 120 Hz refresh rate and a 20:9 aspect ratio. The phone has a 4250 mAh battery with 18 W charging. It has an option for wireless charging. Its camera comes out with a 64 MP primary sensor paired with 13 MP and 5 MP secondary cameras for ultrawide and depth-sensing. The front camera offers a 32 MP selfie shooter.
