= HTC Tattoo =

Android phone

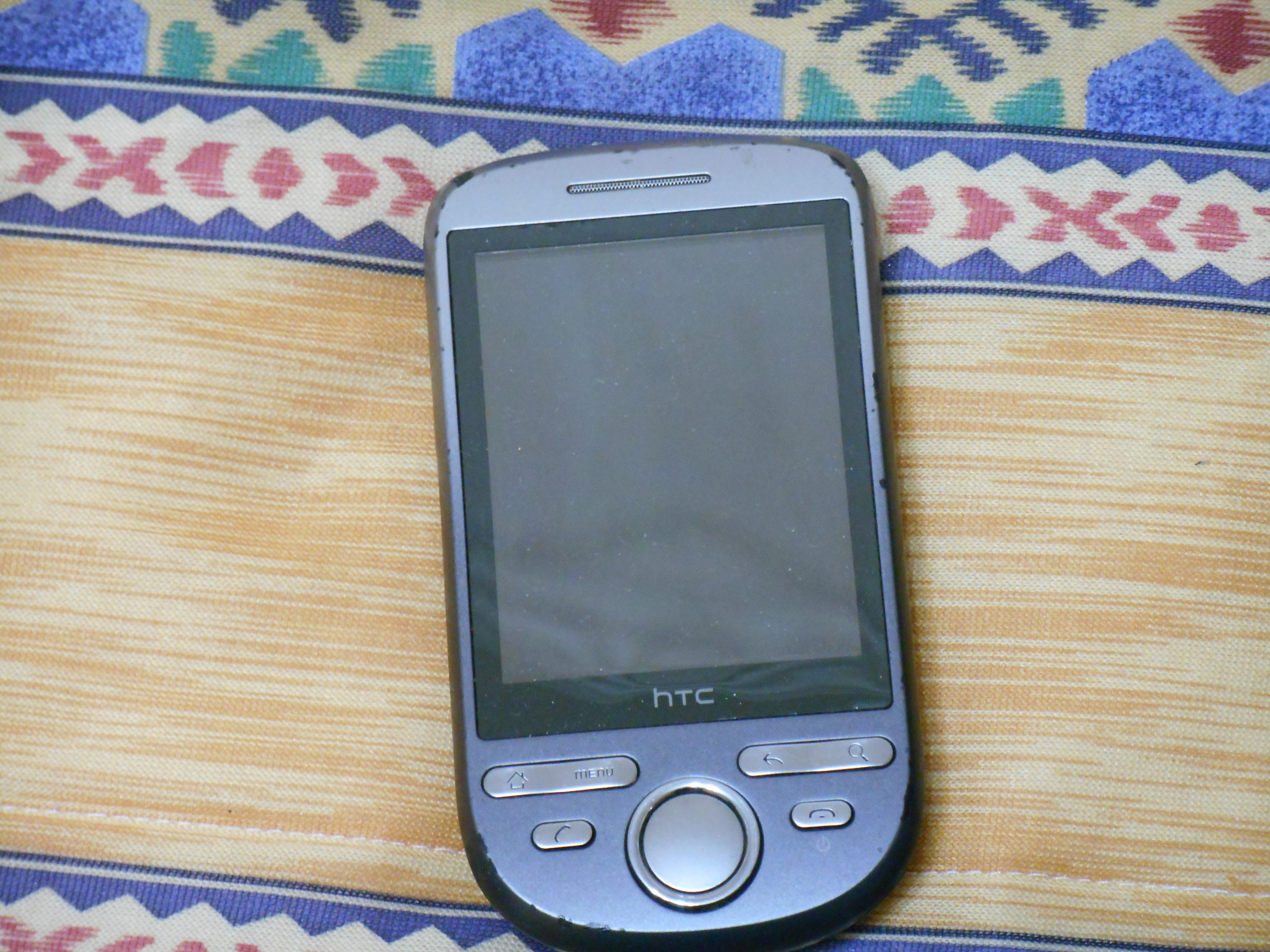
- Manufacturer: HTC Corporation
- Series: A Series
- Predecessor: None
- Successor: HTC Wildfire
- Compatible networks: HSPA/WCDMA 900/2100 MHz; Quad-band GSM/GPRS/EDGE 850/900/1800/1900 MHz (In Indian versions of this model, HTC disabled 3G services, confirmed by HTC)
- Dimensions: 106 x 55.2 x 14 mm (4.17 x 2.17 x 0.55 inches)
- Weight: 113 g (4 oz)
- Operating system: Android 1.6 with HTC Sense
- CPU: Qualcomm MSM7225, 528 MHz
- Memory: ROM: 512 MB, RAM: 256 MB
- Removable storage: microSD memory card (SD 2.0 compatible)
- Battery: 1100 mAh rechargeable Lithium-ion battery
- Rear camera: 3.2 megapixel
- Display: 240 x 320 px, 2.8 in (71 mm), QVGA TFT LCD
- Connectivity: Bluetooth 2.0 + EDR + A2DP; Wi-Fi (802.11b/g); HTC ExtUSB; 3.5mm audio jack
- Data inputs: 4-way navigation control with enter button

The HTC Tattoo (formerly known as the HTC Click) is a phone manufactured by the HTC Corporation for the Android platform. It is the second phone to feature the HTC Sense interface. The phone was announced on 8 September 2009.

Unlike other Android handsets from HTC, the Tattoo has a resistive touchscreen instead of a capacitive touchscreen. The device's designer explained that it was tested with a capacitive display, but that multi-touch simply wasn't practical on such a small screen, while the company's Twitter feed states that a capacitive screen is insufficiently accurate at this size. The Tattoo's resistive screen, which may have helped reduce costs, ended up being HTC's only as all future models released utilized capacitative touch.

== Specifications ==
The specifications on 9 September 2009:

- Screen size: 2.8 in (71 mm)
- Screen resolution: 240 x 320
- Input devices: resistive touchscreen
- 3.2-megapixel fixed-focus rear-facing camera
- GPS (GPS)
- Digital compass
- RAM: 256 MB
- ROM: 512 MB
- microSD slot (SDHC compatible)
- Operating system: Android 1.6 and HTC Sense
- Wi-Fi (802.11b/g)
- Bluetooth 2.0 + EDR & A2DP
- HTC ExtUSB (Mini-B USB backward compatible)
- 3.5 mm audio jack, microphone, speaker
- Accelerometer
- FM radio with RDS

== Customisable covers ==
The HTC Tattoo was the first smartphone from the company with fully customisable covers hence the name Tattoo. The phone's plastic shell can be removed and replaced with one of a design of the owner's choice. The now no longer available TattooMyHTC website was launched on 12 October 2009, offering pre-made designs for €11.99 or personalised designs for €14.99.

== See also ==
- HTC Dream
- HTC Magic
- HTC Hero
- Galaxy Nexus
