= HTC Desire 516 =

2014 smartphone model

HTC Desire 516 dual sim
- Brand: HTC
- Manufacturer: HTC
- Type: Smartphone
- Series: HTC Desire
- First released: June 2014
- Availability by region: India: June 2014; Italy: July 2014
- Discontinued: Yes
- Compatible networks: GSM, HSPA
- Form factor: Slate
- Colors: Black, White
- Dimensions: 140×72×9.7 mm (5.51×2.83×0.38 in)
- Weight: 160 g (5.6 oz)
- Operating system: Android 4.2.2 (Jelly Bean), Sense UI 5.1
- System-on-chip: Qualcomm MSM8625Q Snapdragon 200 (45 nm)
- CPU: Quad-core 1.2 GHz Cortex-A7
- GPU: Adreno 302
- Memory: 1 GB RAM
- Storage: 4 GB eMMC 4.5
- Removable storage: microSDHC (dedicated slot)
- SIM: Dual SIM (Mini-SIM, dual stand-by)
- Battery: Removable Li-Po 1950 mAh
- Rear camera: 5 MP, LED flash
- Front camera: 2 MP
- Display: 5.0 in (127 mm) IPS LCD; 540 x 960 pixels, 16:9 ratio (~220 ppi density)

The HTC Desire 516 is an entry-level Android smartphone manufactured and designed by HTC. It was released in June 2014 and was part of the Desire series. In Italy, it was released in July 2014.

== Specifications ==
=== Design ===
The smartphone features a standard touchscreen form factor with a structural footprint measuring 140 mm in height, 72 mm in width, and 9.7 mm in thickness. Weighing 160 grams, the device is constructed with a body that houses dual Mini-SIM slots capable of supporting dual stand-by operation. The front of the phone is dominated by a 5.0-inch IPS LCD panel that outputs a resolution of 540 x 960 pixels at a 16:9 aspect ratio, resulting in a pixel density of approximately 220 ppi. The physical layout accommodates a standard loudspeaker arrangement, a microUSB 2.0 port for data and charging, and a 3.5mm headphone jack.

=== Hardware ===
The internal hardware is driven by a 45 nm Qualcomm MSM8625Q Snapdragon 200 chipset. This platform utilizes a quad-core 1.2 GHz Cortex-A7 central processing unit alongside an Adreno 302 graphics processing unit. The device comes configured with 1 GB of RAM and 4 GB of internal storage, which can be expanded externally via a dedicated microSDHC card slot. Cellular connectivity supports GSM and HSPA technologies with HSPA data speeds reaching up to 21.1 Mbps for downloads and 5.76 Mbps for uploads. Additional hardware interfaces include Wi-Fi 802.11 b/g/n, Bluetooth 4.0 with A2DP and aptX, an accelerometer, and a GPS module, all powered by a removable 1950 mAh Lithium-Polymer battery.

=== Camera ===
The device utilizes a single rear-facing primary camera containing a 5-megapixel sensor. The main camera module is accompanied by an integrated LED flash to assist in low-light environments and is capable of capturing video at 720p resolution at 30 frames per second. On the front of the chassis, a secondary selfie camera is implemented with a 2-megapixel sensor. This front-facing module supports video recording at a maximum resolution of 480p.

=== Software ===
The smartphone originally shipped with the Android 4.2.2 Jelly Bean operating system. HTC modified the native Android interface by overlaying its proprietary Sense UI 5.1 skin.
