= HTC Wildfire S =

2011 smartphone by HTC

HTC Wildfire SS/Marvel
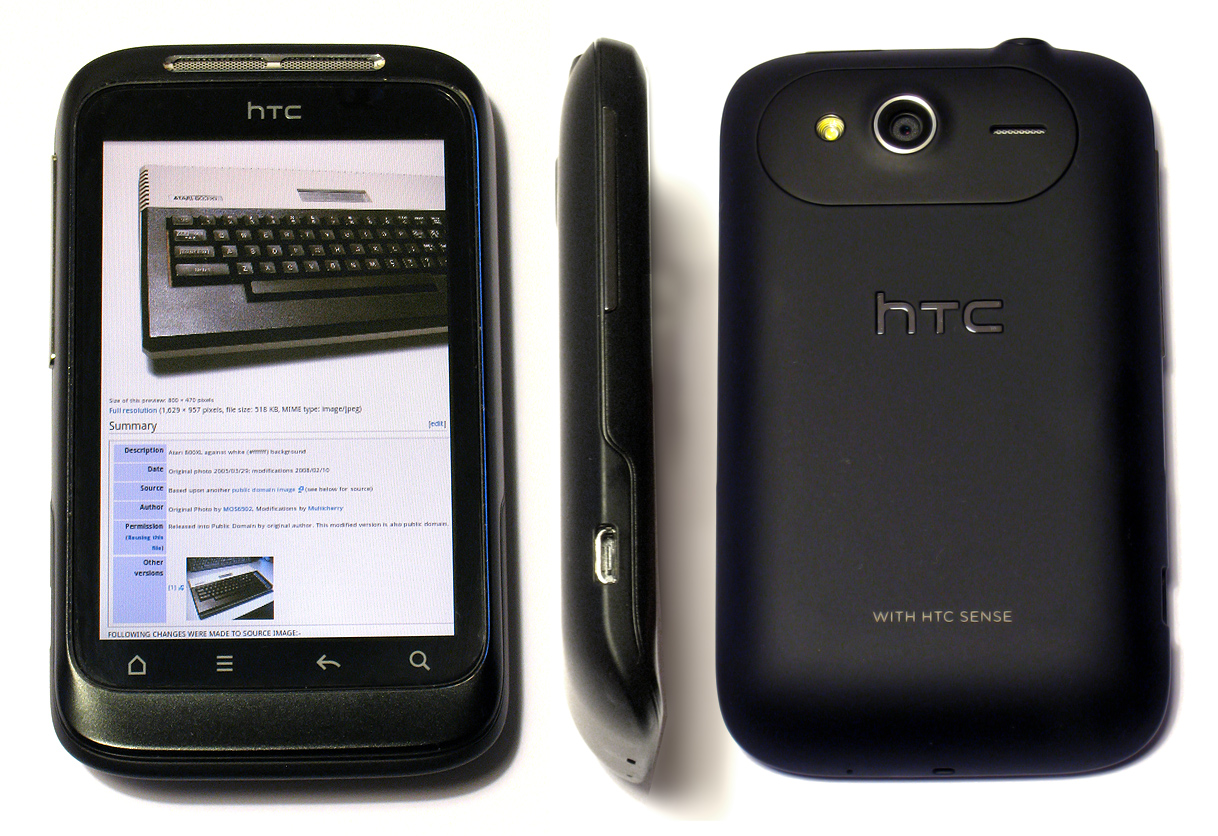
- Manufacturer: HTC Corporation
- Type: Smartphone
- Availability by region: 15 February 2011
- Predecessor: HTC Wildfire
- Successor: HTC Explorer, HTC Desire C
- Compatible networks: Europe/Asia: Quad-band GSM/GPRS/EDGE: 850/900/1800/1900 MHz; HSPA/WCDMA: 900/2100 MHz; United States: CDMA 850/1900 MHz; Australia: WCDMA 850/2100 MHz
- Form factor: Slate smartphone
- Dimensions: 101.3 mm × 59.4 mm × 12.4 mm (3.99 in × 2.34 in × 0.49 in)
- Weight: 105 g (3.7 oz)
- Operating system: Android 2.3.3 Gingerbread (upgradable to 2.3.5) with HTC Sense 2.1. Non-official CyanogenMod ports of Android 4.0 Ice Cream Sandwich, 4.1/4.2/4.3 Jelly Bean, and 4.4 KitKat exist.
- CPU: Qualcomm MSM7227 600 MHz, ARMv6 architecture
- GPU: Adreno 200
- Memory: 512 MB RAM
- Storage: 512 MB (150 MB available)
- Removable storage: microSD, up to 32 GB
- Battery: Li-ion 1230 mAh
- Rear camera: 5 Mpix, autofocus, LED flash, geotagging
- Display: 3.2" 65,536 color TFT LCD HVGA (320 × 480) at 180 pixels per inch.
- Connectivity: Wi-Fi 802.11b/g/n; Bluetooth 3.0 with FTP/OPP, A2DP, PBAP profiles; UMA
- Data inputs: Multi-touch Capacitive touch screen. 3-axis accelerometer A-GPS; Proximity sensor Light sensor Digital compass
- Development status: Discontinued
- Other: Facebook, Twitter, Skype, Microsoft Exchange, Google Maps turn-by-turn navigation

The HTC Wildfire S is a smartphone developed by the HTC Corporation. The model was announced on 15 February 2011 at the Mobile World Congress and released in Europe three months later.

On 14 August 2019, it was announced that the "HTC Wildfire" name had been licensed for use on the HTC Wildfire X a phone manufactured by a third-party company and intended for the Indian market.

== Hardware and software ==
HTC Wildfire S is considered to be an update of 2010's HTC Wildfire, having a newer, 600 MHz processor by Qualcomm, support for the faster Bluetooth 3.0 specification, and a screen with double the resolution (HVGA, updated from QVGA).

The Wildfire S includes a TFT LCD capacitive touchscreen and a 5-megapixel camera.

Unlike its predecessor, the Wildfire S has no trackball or trackpad.

The device runs on Android 2.3.5 Gingerbread, and comes with an upgrade to HTC's Sense UI.

However, by rooting, the user is able to install CyanogenMod versions of Android 4.0, 4.1 and even 4.4.

== Availability ==
In the United Kingdom, the Wildfire S was available from several carriers, including 3 (Hutchison 3G), Vodafone, Orange, Tesco Mobile, T-Mobile and O_{2}.

In the United States, it was available through carriers US Cellular, T-Mobile, Virgin Mobile USA and MetroPCS; in Canada through Bell Canada and Virgin Mobile Canada; in Australia through Telstra; in New Zealand through Telecom New Zealand; and in India it was available in open market.

In Ireland, it was available through networks Meteor, eMobile, Vodafone, O_{2}, 3 (Hutchison 3G), and Tesco Mobile.

In Bulgaria, it was available through networks Mobiltel, GLOBUL and Vivacom.

In Pakistan, it was available on several networks including Telenor, Ufone, Jazz and Zong.

== See also ==
- Galaxy Nexus
- HTC Sense
