= HTC Desire 500 =

2013 Android-based smartphone by HTC

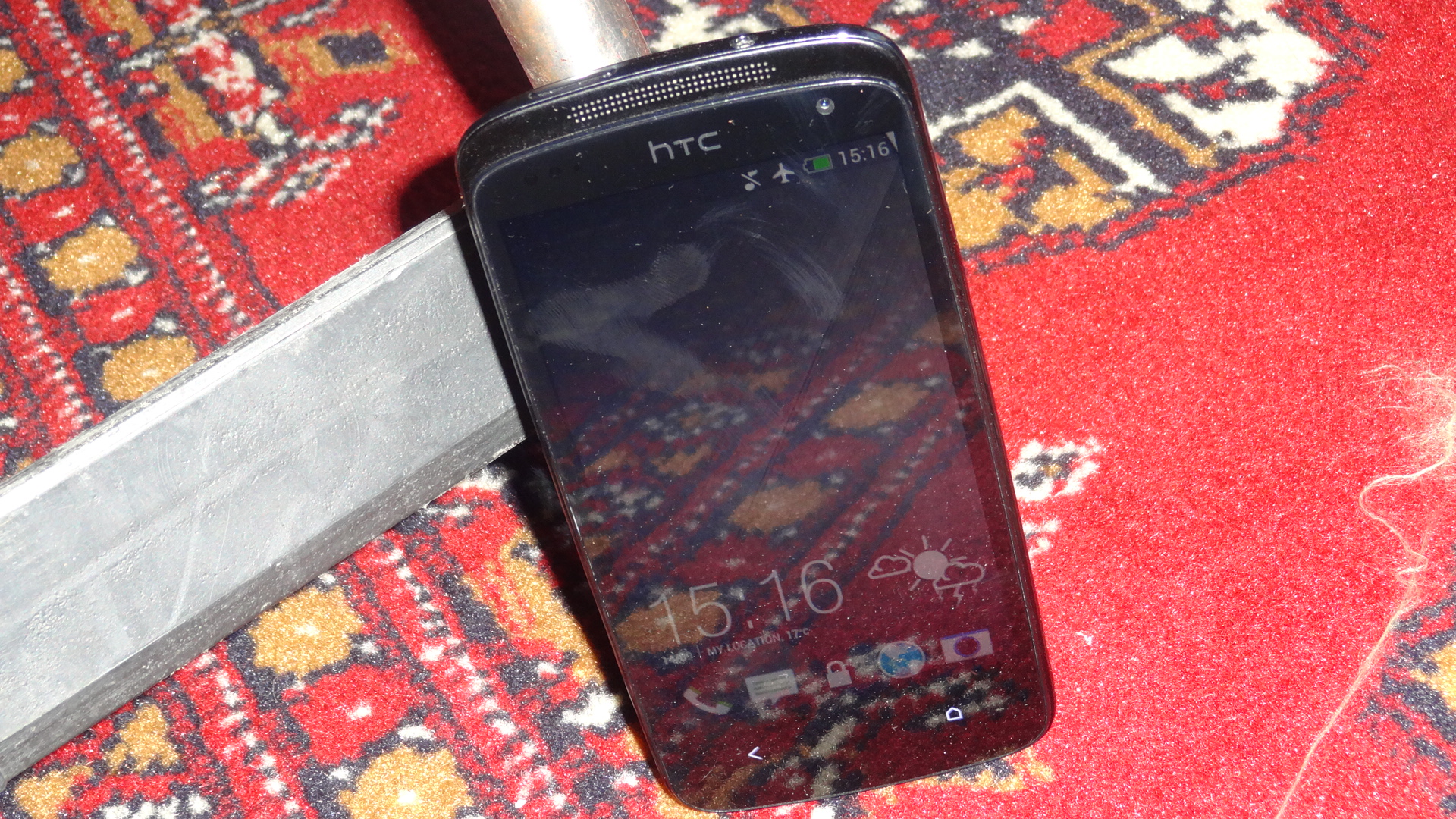
- Manufacturer: HTC
- Type: Smartphone
- Series: HTC Desire series
- First released: September 1, 2013; 12 years ago
- Compatible networks: 2G; 3G (Only one SIM card can be used at 3G at a time on the Dual SIM model)
- Form factor: Slate
- Dimensions: 131.8 mm (5.19 in) H 66.9 mm (2.63 in) W 9.9 mm (0.39 in) D
- Weight: 123 g (4.3 oz)
- Operating system: Android 4.1.2 "Jelly Bean", Sense UI 5.0
- System-on-chip: Qualcomm Snapdragon 200
- CPU: Quad-core 1.2 GHz Cortex-A5
- GPU: Adreno 203
- Memory: 1 GB LPDDR3 RAM
- Storage: 4 GB internal storage (1 GB user accessible)
- Removable storage: microSD up to 64 GB
- Battery: 1,800 mAh Li-ion removable battery
- Rear camera: 8-megapixel camera with autofocus, LED dual tone flash, 1/3.2' sensor size, 1.4μm pixel size, geo-tagging, face/smile detection, HTC ImageChip image processing chip, 720p video recording
- Front camera: 1.6-megapixel, 720p video recording
- Display: 4.3 in (110 mm) WVGA with RGB matrix 800 x 480 pixels (217 ppi)
- Sound: Beats Audio technology
- Connectivity: Wi-Fi 802.11 a/b/g/n Wi-Fi Hotspot; DLNA; Bluetooth 4.0; A2DP; NFC microUSB; 3.5 mm headphone jack
- Model: 500
- Website: www.htc.com/in/support/htc-desire-500-dual-sim//

The HTC Desire 500 (also known as HTC Desire 500 Dual Sim) is a low-mid-range Android smartphone released by HTC in 2013. On 23 July 2013, HTC Desire 500 was announced in Taiwan. On 7 August 2013, the device was unveiled for the European market.

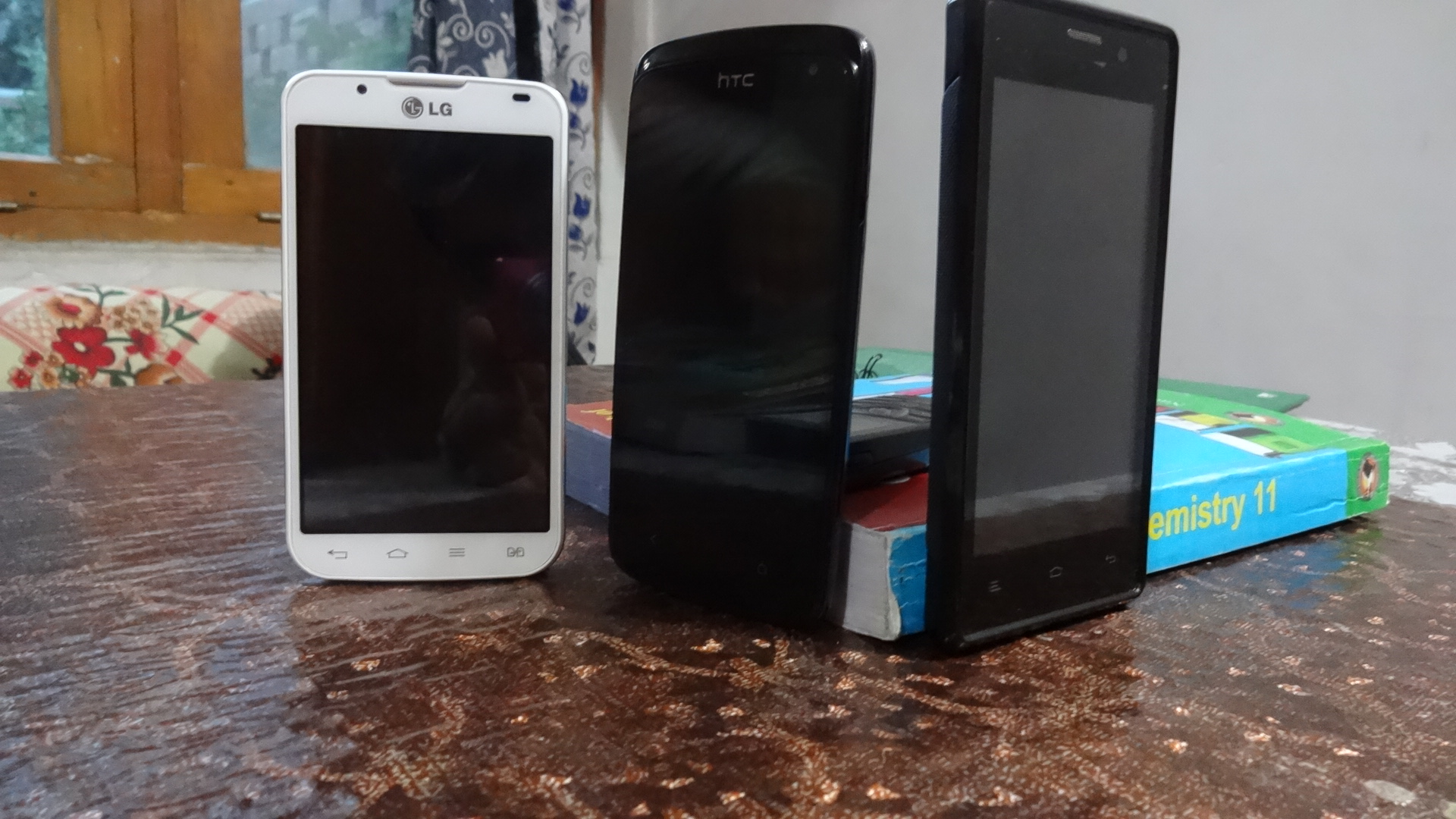
Desire 500 in the middle

== Specifications ==
=== Design ===
The HTC Desire 500 has a 4.3 inch display; there is an earpiece, a front-facing camera and an "HTC" logo at the upper bezel of the display and there are two capacitive buttons (back and home buttons) at the lower bezel of the display.

The side frame is wrapped by a color stripe that is only interrupted at the volume rocker. On the side frame; there is a volume rocker on the right side, there is a power button and a headphone jack at the top and there is a microUSB port and a microphone hole at the bottom; the left side is empty.

The rear-facing camera paired with an LED flash and the speaker are located at the back. The phone has a plastic unibody back cover; removing the back cover reveals a removable battery, a microSIM card slot, and a microSD card slot for storage expansion.

The HTC Desire 500 measures 131.8 x 66.9 x 9.9 mm and weighs 123 grams; the dual SIM model weighs 130 grams, 7 grams heavier than the normal model. It is available in black, white with red accents and white with green accents.

=== Hardware ===
HTC equips the Desire 500 with Qualcomm Snapdragon 200 8225Q system-on-chip that comprises a 1.2 GHz quad-core ARM Cortex-A5 CPU that supports ARMv7 instruction set and Adreno 203 GPU and is manufactured on a 45 nm manufacturing process. It comes with 1 GB of RAM and 4 GB of internal storage expandable up to 64 GB through the microSD card slot. Only 1 GB of the 4 GB internal storage is user-accessible.

The HTC Desire 500 has a 4.3 inch LCD with a resolution of 800x480 pixels (WVGA), RGB matrix and a pixel density of 217 ppi.

The HTC Desire 500 has an 8-megapixel BSI rear camera sensor with 3264x2448 pixels, 0.312 inches sensor size, f/2.4 aperture, and 28mm focal length. The front camera has a resolution of 1.6 megapixels. Both the front-facing and the rear-facing camera can record HD videos (720p). It also has HTC's dedicated image processing chip named HTC ImageChip. It supports HDR and panorama.

The HTC Desire 500 has an 1800 mAh removable battery. HTC claims that the phone can last up to 435 hours of 3G standby time and just over 12 hours of 3G talk.

=== Software ===
The Desire 500 runs on Android 4.1.2 Jelly Bean in combination with the latest version of HTC's launcher Sense 5.0 out of the box; one popular feature is HTC BlinkFeed.

== Reception ==
NotebookCheck reviewed the HTC Desire 500. It was noted that the MicroSD slot and the removable battery were certainly two important features of the HTC Desire 500, similar to the Samsung Galaxy S4 Mini and quite the opposite of the HTC One Mini. High brightness and high viewing angles of the display were praised but the processor performance was criticized.

PhoneArena reviewed the HTC Desire 500. Photo quality, design, and call quality were considered the pros and uncomfortable physical keys and lack of backlighting on the capacitive keys were considered the cons of the device.

GSMArena reviewed the HTC Desire 500. WVGA display resolution, mediocre video recording, lack of Full HD video recording, poor video codec support of the default video player, and limited internal storage were considered as the main disadvantages of the device.
