= Wyldfire =

Location-based dating application

- Developers: Andrew White, Brian Freeman
- Release: 2014
- Operating system: Apple iOS
- Type: Social networking
- Website: www.wyldfireapp.com

Wyldfire is a location-based dating application available on iOS. It was founded by San Diego–based Andrew White and Brian Freeman in 2014, and was inspired by Tinder.

The app was designed to create a better environment for women online by giving them control over which men join the network. All men who join are approved by a female member, and chat between members is limited to 20 messages. Five of the company's 11-member launch team are women and the site was backed by $150,000 in angel funding.

The company's first marketing message centered on a "ditch the creeps," movement supported by a humorous YouTube video.
