= HTC Desire 826 =

2015 Android smartphone

The HTC Desire 826 is a mid-range Android smartphone by HTC. It was announced at the Consumer Electronics Show in January 2015 and released in March. Critics noted the 5.5 inch 1080p IPS display, 4 MP UltraPixel front camera, octa-core 64-bit Qualcomm Snapdragon 615 processor, 2GB of RAM, and BoomSound front speakers.
