= HTC Desire 610 =

Android smartphone

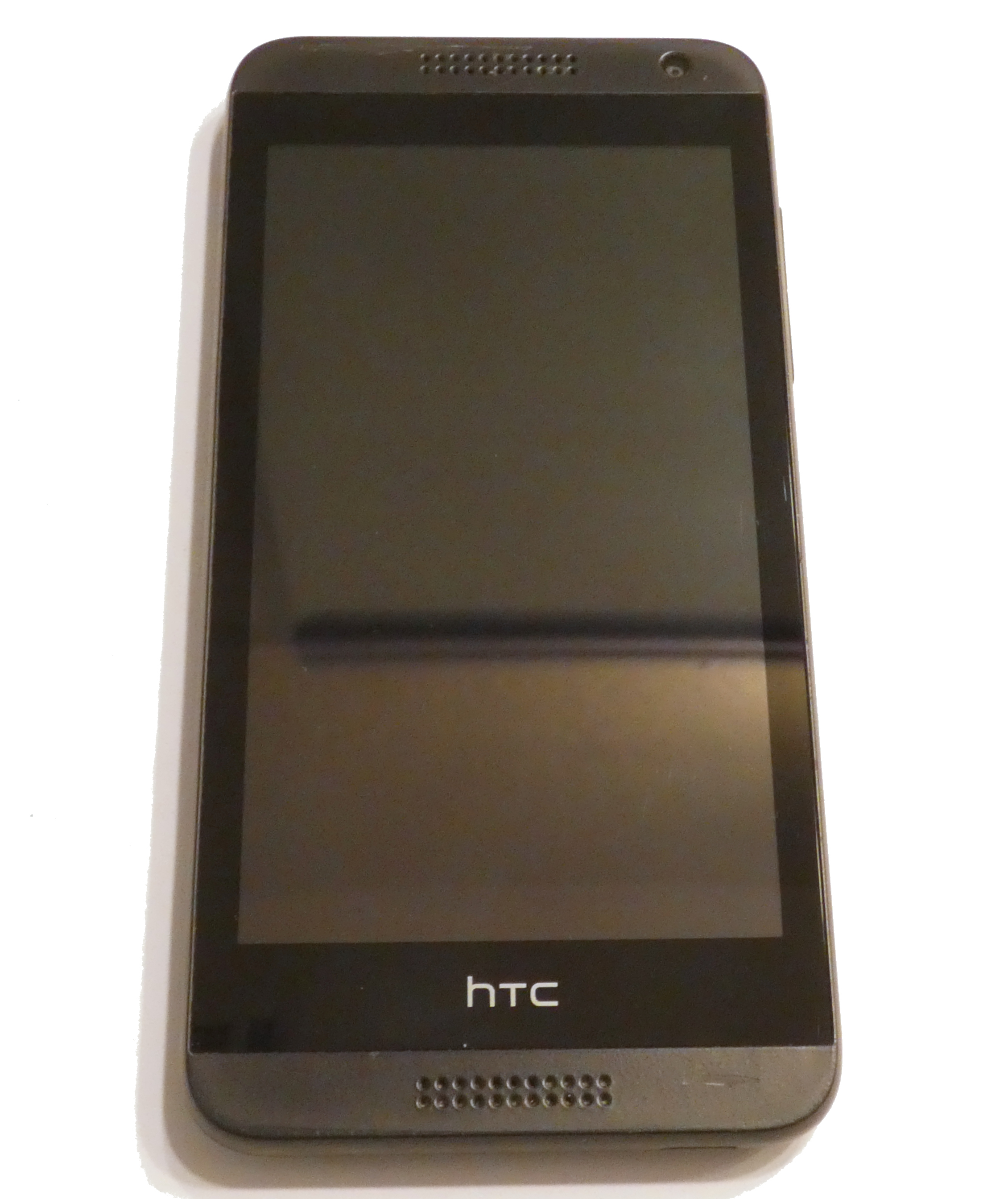
- Manufacturer: HTC
- Type: Touchscreen Smartphone
- Series: HTC Desire
- Predecessor: HTC Desire 601
- Successor: HTC Desire 620
- Related: HTC One Mini 2, HTC Desire 816
- Dimensions: 143.1×70.5×9.6 mm (5.63×2.78×0.38 in)
- Weight: 143.5 g [5.04 oz]
- Operating system: Android 4.4.2 KitKat with HTC Sense 6.0
- System-on-chip: Qualcomm Snapdragon 400
- CPU: 1.2 GHz quad-core Krait
- GPU: Adreno 305
- Memory: 1 GB RAM (815MB available on official Android 4.4.2 build)
- Storage: 8 GB
- Removable storage: microSD up to 128 GB
- Battery: Li-Po 2040 mAh Stand-by up to 650 h (3G)
- Rear camera: 8 MP BSI sensor; LED Flash 720p, video recording
- Front camera: 1.3 MP BSI sensor; 720p video recording
- Display: 4.7 in (12 cm) qHD 540×960 px (EU Version); 4.7 in (12 cm); FWVGA 480x854 px (AT&T Version)
- Connectivity: Bluetooth 4.0; micro-USB with USB OTG support; Wi-Fi; LTE; 4G
- Website: http://www.htc.com/us/smartphones/htc-desire-610/

The HTC Desire 610 is an Android-based smartphone designed and manufactured by HTC. It is an affordable smartphone part of the Desire range of mid-range handsets, and was aimed at the same market sector with devices such as the Motorola Moto G, Sony Xperia M2 and Nokia Lumia 735. It was announced on 24 February 2014 at Mobile World Congress 2014 in Barcelona, Spain. It was released in China in March 2014, in Europe starting April 2014 and in Australia on 5 August 2014.

It was rumored that the HTC Desire 610 was also going to be sold by the American carrier AT&T. On 16 July 2014, HTC Desire 610 was listed as 'coming soon" on AT&T's website and the company unveiled that the phone will be put on sale on 25 July 2014. The AT&T model of the device was released on 25 July 2014.

== Specifications ==
=== Design ===
The HTC Desire has a unibody plastic design.

The phone has a 4.7 inch display with sizable bezels; there is a front-facing camera and a speaker grill at the upper bezel of the display while there is an "HTC" logo and a speaker grill at the lower bezel of the display. On the side frame; there is a SIM card/microSD card tray at the left, there is a volume rocker at the right, there is a power button and a 3.5 mm headphone jack at the top and there is a microUSB port at the bottom. At the back, there is a rear-facing camera and an LED flash right under it along with an "HTC" logo. The back panel is not removable.

The phone measures 143.1 x 70.5 x 9.6 mm and weighs 143.5 grams. It is available in orange, blue, green, white, gray and black.

=== Hardware ===
The HTC Desire 610 is powered by Qualcomm Snapdragon 400 system-on-chip consisting of a 1.2 GHz quad-core Krait CPU and Adreno 305 GPU. It comes with 1 GB RAM and 8 GB internal storage expandable up to 128 GB by using a microSD card. The phone has a 4.7 inch LCD with 540x940 pixels (qHD) resolution and 234 ppi pixel density; the display on the AT&T model has 480x854 pixels (FWVGA) resolution and 200 ppi pixel density. The device has a 8MP rear-facing camera with f/2.4 aperture coupled with an LED flash and a 1.3 MP front-facing camera; both the front-facing and the rear-facing cameres are capable of 720p video recording. The phone has BoomSound front-facing stereo speakers. It has a 2040 mAh Li-Po non-removable battery.

The HTC Desire 610 has Wi-Fi 802.11 b/g/n, Bluetooth 4.0, GPS and microUSB. It also has DLNA support, enabling wireless streaming from compatible devices. The phone supports 4G LTE networks.

=== Software ===
The HTC Desire 610 runs on Android 4.4.2 KitKat with HTC's user interface Sense 6. The software includes HTC Blinkfeed that displays social media network notifications and latest news on the homescreen as well as HTC Zoe that highlights recorded videos in the gallery and HTC Sense Voice noise detection for clearer calls.

== Reception ==
The HTC Desire 610 received mixed reviews.

Andrew Hole from CNET reviewed the device and gave it 6.3 points out of 10. He praised the design, the camera quality and the low price but criticized the display quality, the performance and the outdated Android operating system version. He concluded that there were better phones for cheaper prices.

James Norton from TechRadar reviewed the device and gave it 3 stars out of 5. He praised the software experience, the performance and the connectivity options but criticized the display quality, the camera quality and the speaker quality. He also stated that the phone had bulky bezels and the battery life was average. He concluded that there were better devices at similar prices.

Evan Kypreos from Trusted Reviews reviewed the device and gave it 3.5 stars out of 5. He described the phone as "a solid all-rounder". He stated the camera quality was decent and the performance was adequate, but he criticized the battery life. He concluded that the HTC Desire 610 was a good phone but there were better phones at similar prices.

Lanh Nyugen from Android Authority reviewed the AT&T model of the device. He praised the design and the performance but criticized the camera quality. He stated that the bezels were too big, the BoomSound stereo speakers weren't as good compared to higher-tier HTC devices and the battery life was average.
