= Wildfire (motor company) =

Defunct American motor vehicle manufacturer

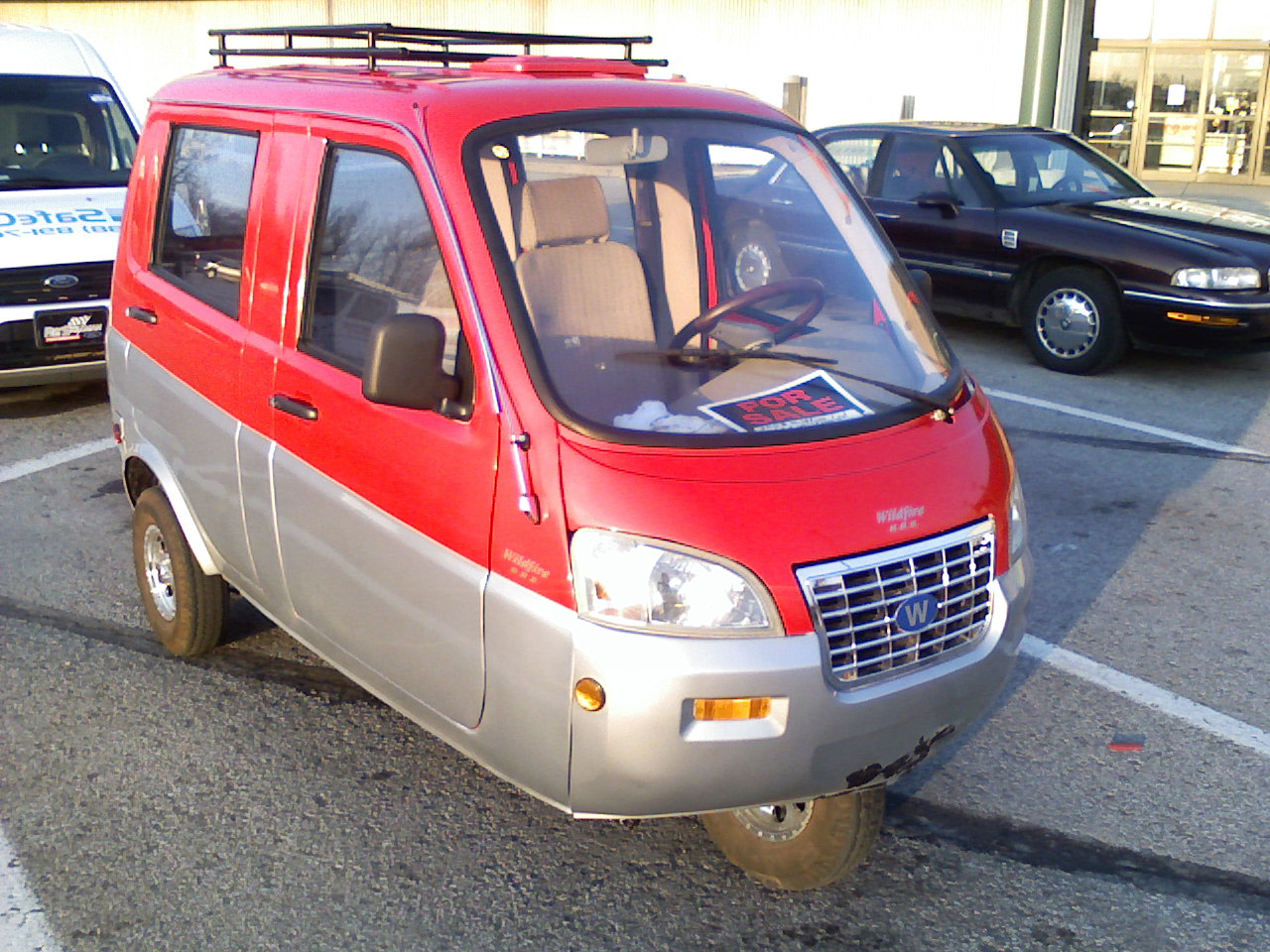
- The Wildfire WF650-C, produced from 1999 to 2013
- Type: Motor company
- Industry: Transportation
- Founded: November 30, 1998
- Headquarters: Steubenville, Ohio
- Website: www.wildfireapp.com

Wildfire Motors was a company based in Steubenville, Ohio, specializing in the sales of scooters, motorcycles, ATVs, cyclecars, and electric vehicles. The vehicles are manufactured in China and are distributed throughout the United States.

This distributor has ten cases under review with the Ohio Attorney General and 30 with the Better Business Bureau.

The United States Environmental Protection Agency (EPA) announced on April 3, 2013, that it is withdrawing approval of the import and sale of up to 74,000 gas-powered on- and off-road motorcycles and all-terrain vehicles from China. The agency believes that it received either incomplete or falsified certification information.

== Former Models ==
=== WF650-T and WF650-C ===
The Wildfire WF650-T is a three-wheeled truck. The Wildfire WF650-C is a three-wheeled hatchback sedan. Both are registered with the Department of Transportation as motorcycles. They are powered by a 650 cc water-cooled 4-stroke twin engine. The manufacturer states the vehicles get up to 60 miles per gallon, although some dealers have suggested 40–60 miles per gallon is a more realistic figure. Both vehicles are manufactured by Jiangsu Sandi Motorcycle Co Ltd.

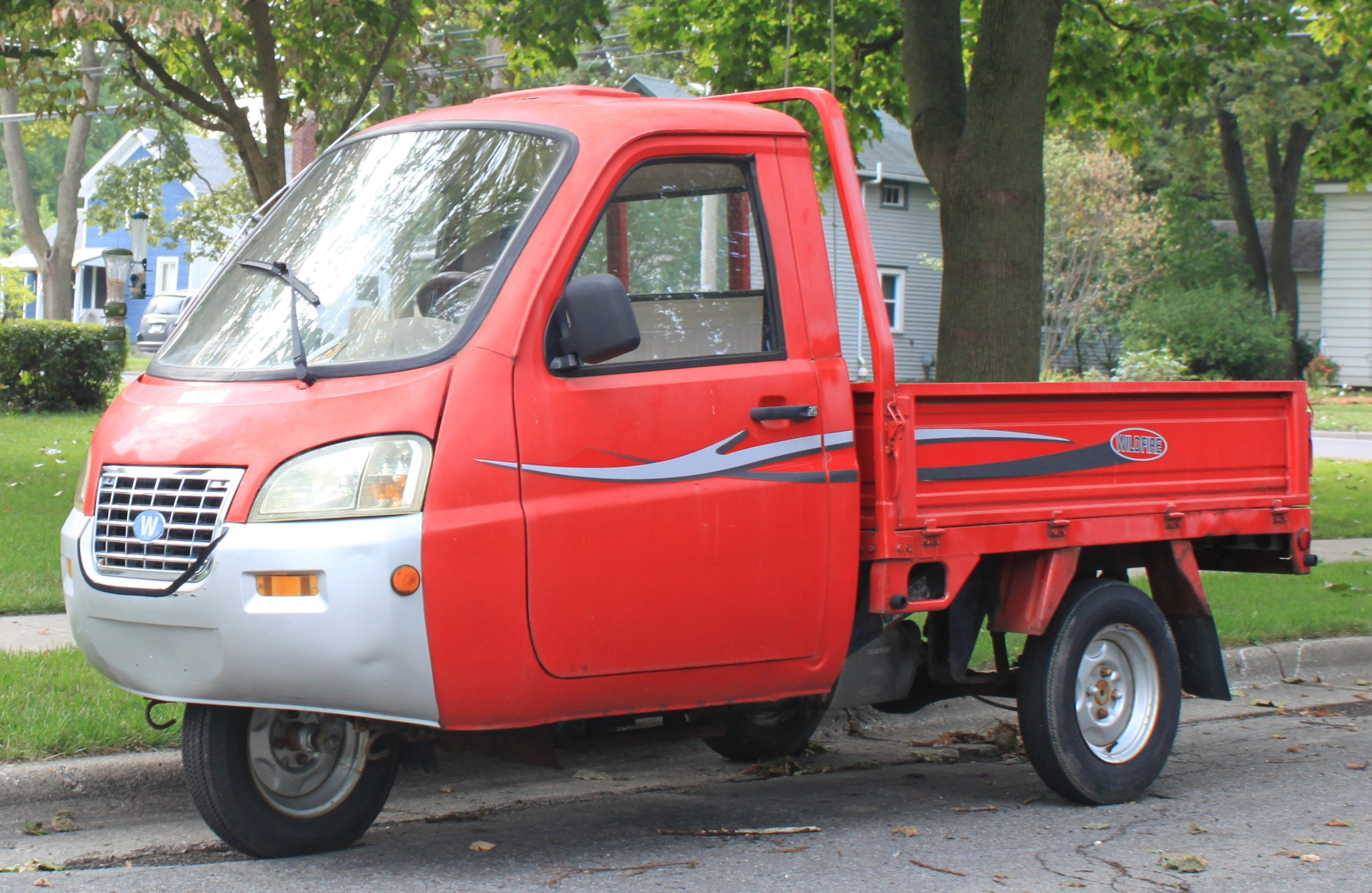
Wildfire WF650-T

On April 3, 2013, the EPA withdrew its approval of the import and sale of over 70,000 gas-powered on- and off-road motorcycles and all-terrain vehicles because the agency believes that it received either incomplete or falsified certification information. The EPA issued the vehicle certificates from 2006 to 2012 to two companies which operate as Snyder Technology, Inc. and Snyder Computer Systems, Inc. (doing business as Wildfire Motors Corporation). As a result of an investigation, the agency believes that the applications for the certificates contained fallacious information and must be voided. All vehicles imported into or manufactured in the United States are required to have certificates of conformity.

=== WF-120V Total Electric NEV and WF-72V ===
The WF-120V is a two-seat coupe manufactured by Shandong Huoyun Electric Car Co., Ltd, located in Zibo, China. The WF-72 V is a four-seat sedan manufactured by Shandong Pioneer Motorcycle Co., Ltd. The WF-120 is powered by an 8.5 kilowatt, 120 volt AC motor. The WF-72 V is powered by an 8.5 kilowatt, 72 volt, AC motor. The styling of the WF-120 V seems to be a copy of the Smart, including lines in quarter panels where the Smart doors are supposed to close. This appears to be a liability and the owner of the Smart design (Mercedes) may force the manufacturer to stop import or take other legal action. As they are registered as neighborhood electric vehicles, both are programmed by the manufacturer not to exceed 25 miles per hour but can be adjusted to run up to 50 miles per hour.

=== WF250-T and WF250-C ===
The WF250-T is a three-wheeled truck. The WF250-C is a three-wheeled hatchback sedan. Both were manufactured by Shandong Pioneer Motorcycle Co., Ltd. as well as Ammar Motor Company, which manufactures right hand drive versions and is located in Karachi, Pakistan.
