= Phone theme =

Mobile phone user interface characteristic

A phone theme or phone skin refers to the general look and feel of a mobile phone’s user interface (UI). It includes color schemes for menus and highlights, background images and, for Series 60 (S60) themes, user and folder icons. A theme package contains graphics for one or many changeable components of a mobile phone's UI. Changing a theme only affects the look and feel of the UI and not the entire phone's functions or features.

There are many mobile operating systems which support themes as standard, such as Nokia phones powered by Symbian, Sony Ericsson and Blackberry. Although Google's Android operating system doesn't support themes as standard, there are applications that provide it; aftermarket Android distributions such as CyanogenMod (and its successor LineageOS) along with vendor-specific implementations do offer their own theme engines.

There are sites that offer customization services for phone themes.

Android has different skins.
