= HTC Desire 816 =

2014 Android smartphone

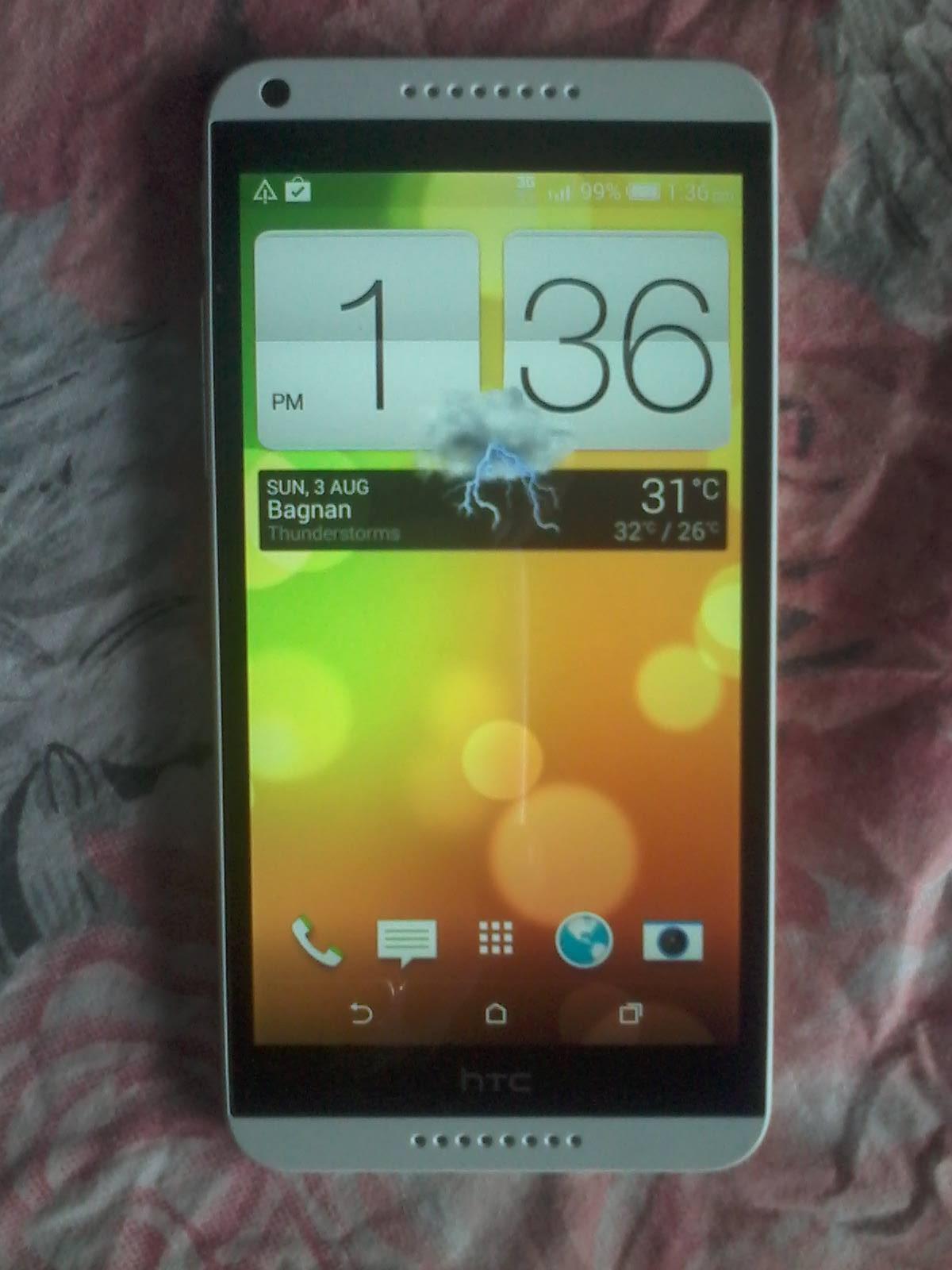
- Manufacturer: HTC
- Series: HTC Desire
- First released: 2014
- Compatible networks: HSDPA (3G) 850/900/2100, GSM (2G) 850 / 900 / 1800 / 1900, LTE (4G) band 3(1800), 7(2600), 8(900), 20(800) - EMEA version, LTE band 1(2100), 3(1800), 7(2600), 8(900) - Asia version CDMA (1x-RTT/1x-Advanced) 800/1900, (EV-DO Rev. A) 1900, LTE (4G) band 25 (1900), band 26 (800), band 41 (2500) - US version
- Dimensions: 156.6 mm (6.17 in) H 78.7 mm (3.10 in) W 7.9 mm (0.31 in) D
- Weight: 165 g (6 oz)
- Operating system: Android v4.4.2 (KitKat) (Original) Android v5.0.2 (Lollipop) (first major update) HTC Sense 6.0 Upgradeable to Android 6.0 HTC Sense 7.0 Upgradeable to Android 12 via custom ROM
- CPU: Quad-core Qualcomm Snapdragon 400, 1.6 GHz Cortex-A7
- GPU: Adreno 305
- Memory: 8 GB, 1.5 GB RAM
- Removable storage: MicroSD up to 128 GB
- Battery: Non-removable Li-Po 2600 mAh battery Stand-by: Up to 737 h (3G); Talk time: Up to 21 h (3G)
- Rear camera: 13 MP, 4160 x 3120 pixels, BSi sensor, f/2.2, 28 mm lens, 1080p video recording, autofocus, LED flash, check quality
- Front camera: 5 MP, BSI sensor, 1080p video recording
- Display: Super LCD2 capacitive touchscreen, 16M colors, 720 x 1280 pixels
- Sound: MP3
- Connectivity: micro usb v2.0, Wi-Fi 802.11 b/g/n, DLNA, hotspot
- Data inputs: Touch Screen

The HTC Desire 816 is a mid ranged Android-based smartphone designed and manufactured by HTC. Announced at the 2014 Mobile World Congress in Barcelona, Spain, it features a 5.5-inch super LCD 2 display with a 1280x720 resolution, with full HD video recording and play-back.

== Features ==
HTC Desire 816 offers HTC Sense 6, a 1.6 GHz Qualcomm Snapdragon 400 system on chip with 1.5 GB RAM, 8 GB internal memory, 128 GB external memory capacity and a non removable 2600 mAh battery. It also comes with a 13.0 MP rear-facing camera and 5 MP front-facing camera. It has dual front facing speakers with Boom Sound. The smartphone runs on android version 4.4.2 and is upgradeable to 5.0.2, lollipop, globally in April 2015. later, the phone can be upgraded to Android 6.0.

== Firmware Upgrade ==
In March, HTC revamped its sense home to a version 7. Users can create their own phone theme or can access and use various themes, wallpapers, sounds. This works best with HTC Sense 7 and the HTC "zoe" feature fully active. New power saving and extreme power saving options extend battery life or when the users need to ward off from switching off the phone due to low battery level.

Apps include one that operates the integral FM broadcast receiver.

== Successors ==
HTC also launched new HTC Desire 816G in September that runs on Android 4.4 KitKat OS and a Mediatek processor. HTC Desire 820 is the successor of desire 816.

== See also ==
- Comparison of HTC devices
- HTC Desire C
- HTC Desire 620
- HTC Desire Eye
- HTC Desire Z
