= HTC Desire 200 =

2013 Android smartphone

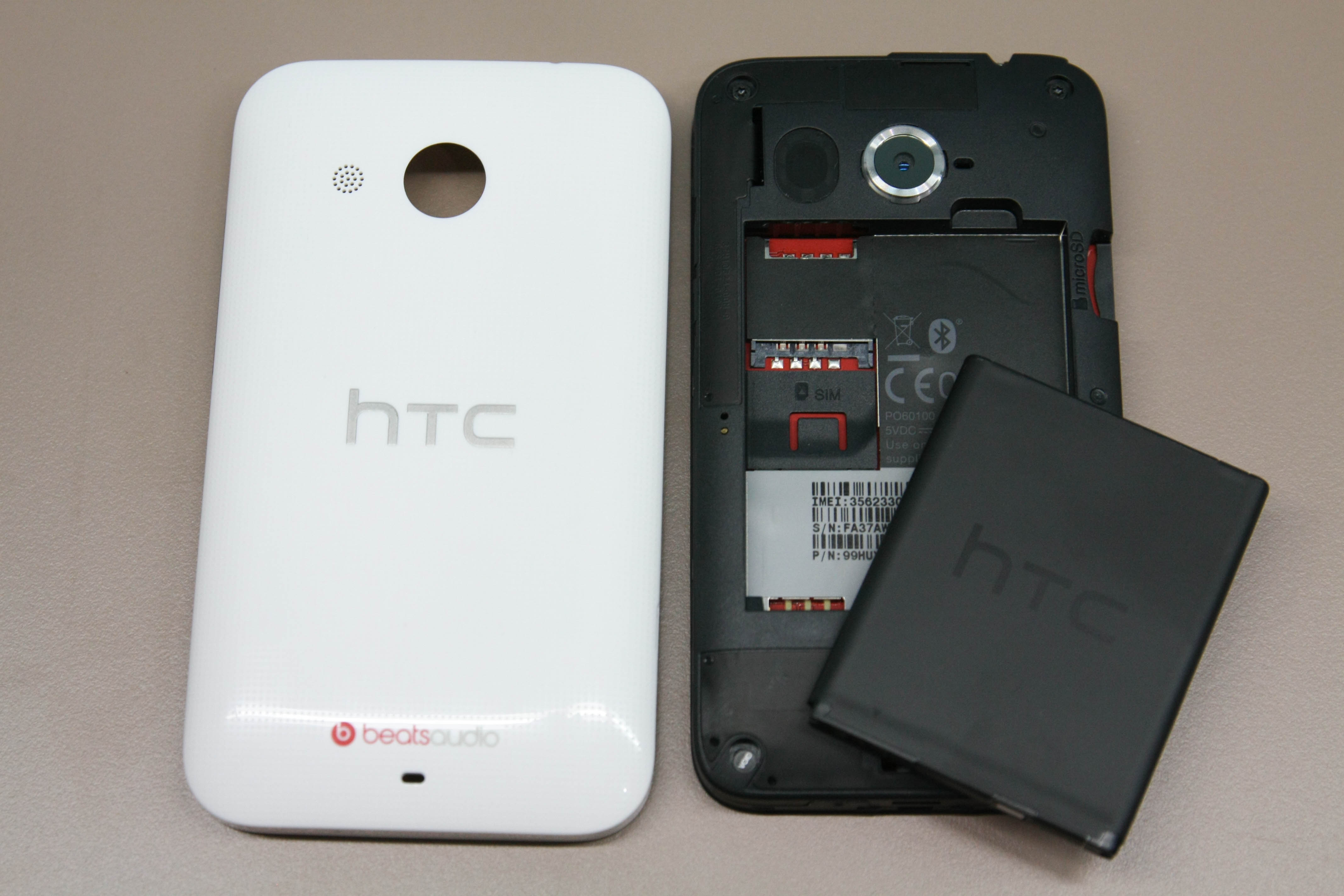
HTC Desire 200 with back cover removed

The HTC Desire 200 is a low-end Android smartphone released by HTC in 2013. It uses a 3.5-inch display and single-core 1 GHz processor. It was officially unveiled on 18 June 2013 on the website of HTC. Its Taiwan release price was NT$4990.

== Specifications ==
=== Hardware ===
The HTC Desire 200 has a 3.5-inch LCD with 480 x 320 resolution, Qualcomm Snapdragon S1 system-on-chip with a single-core 1 GHz CPU, 512 MB of DDR RAM and 4 GB of internal storage expandable with a microSD card up to 32 GB, and a 5 MP fixed-focus rear camera that has f/2.8 aperture and 34 mm focal length, and can record videos up to VGA (640x480) resolution.

The device uses a 1230 mAh removable battery, supporting up to 10 hours and 50 minutes of 2G talk time, or 7 hours and 20 minutes of 3G talk time.

The device supports 3G networking with HSDPA speeds of up to 7.2 Mbit/s and HSUPA speeds of up to 5.76 Mbit/s. The device also supports Bluetooth 4.0, Wi-Fi 802.11 b/g/n, microUSB and GPS and Beats Audio enhancements. The package also includes "our highest quality in-ear headset" as said by HTC.

The device measures 107.7 x 60.8 x 11.9 mm and weighs 100 grams.

=== Software ===
The HTC Desire 200 uses Android Ice Cream Sandwich software with HTC's custom Sense interface.

== Reception ==
Critical reception to the device was mixed when it was initially released. Sharif Sakr of Engadget called the form factor of the device "neat" and the Snapdragon processor "aging", and said that the device has "decent-looking build quality and styling". Bogdan Bele of Android Authority noted that the device was intended for "more budget-conscious" customers that are "willing to make some serious compromises in terms of features". Andy Boxall of Digital Trends commented that the device looks "sleek and stylish" in its official pictures. Kate Solomon of TechRadar described the device as "diminuitive [sic] size with ageing specs".

PhoneArena gave the device a score of 6.5 out of 10. The review noted that the small size of the device meant that it was easy to hold, and the volume and power buttons were easy to press with tactile feedback. The 3.5 inch display was criticized for its low size and resolution, causing the web browsing to be "rather uninspiring", and the Sense 4.0 user interface "doesn't look all that pretty" at the screen resolution. Performance was relatively slow due to the entry level processor and 512 MB of RAM, and only 1 GB of the 4 GB of internal storage was accessible for the user. The 5 MP camera was fixed focus but very fast for capturing both photos and videos, and pictures were usually underexposed and noisy in auto shooting mode.

This phone wasn't being fared well in Western Europe, mainly due to lack of NFC of which the Desire C had.
