= HTC Wildfire =

Android OS smartphone made by HTC Corporation

HTC Wildfire HTC Wildfire CDMA

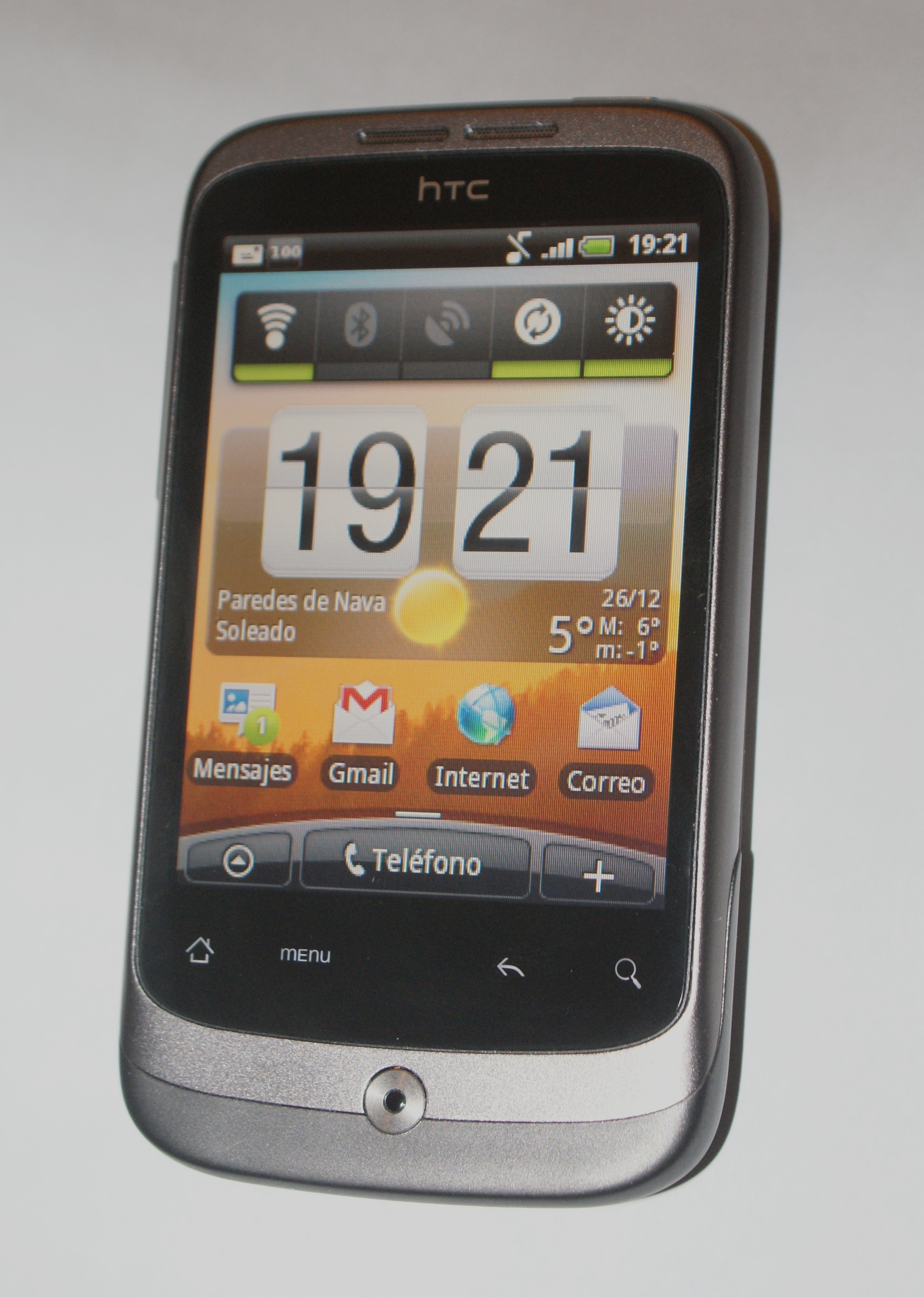
- Manufacturer: HTC Corporation
- Type: Slate smartphone
- Series: Wildfire
- Predecessor: HTC Tattoo
- Successor: HTC Wildfire S HTC Wildfire X
- Related: HTC Wildfire E series
- Compatible networks: Europe/Asia Pacific: HSPA/WCDMA: 900/2100 MHz (A3333) or 850/2100 MHz (A3335) or 850/1900 MHz (A3334, also called "Wildfire A"); GSM: 850/900/1800/1900 MHz;
- Form factor: Candybar smartphone
- Dimensions: Original: 106.75 (4.2) × 60.4 (2.4) × 12.19 (0.48) mm (in); CDMA ver.: 116.9 (4.6) × 61 (2.4) × 12 (0.47) mm (in)
- Weight: Original: 118 g (4.2 oz); CDMA ver.: 115 g (4.1 oz)
- Operating system: Android 2.1 (Eclair) with HTC Sense Upgradable to 2.2, 2.2.1 and 2.3 (CDMA only) via HTC or 2.3.3 and 2.3.7 via CyanogenMod7 or CyanogenMod7.2. (Stable) or Android 4.0.4 (Ice Cream Sandwich) via CyanogenMod 9. (Stable, camera working with the use of power button, No panoramic mode or built in Youtube app)
- CPU: Qualcomm MSM7225 528 MHz (Overclocked 768 MHz)
- Memory: 384 MB
- Storage: 512 MB
- Removable storage: Supports up to 32 GB microSD
- Battery: Li-ion 1300 mAh
- Rear camera: 5 Megapixel autofocus with LED flash and geotagging, autofocus
- Display: Original: 3.2 in (8.1 cm) TFT LCD QVGA 240 × 320 capacitive touchscreen CDMA ver.: 3.2 in (8.1 cm) TFT LCD 256,000-color 240 × 320 capacitive touchscreen
- Connectivity: Wi-Fi (802.11b/g); Bluetooth 2.1 with EDR;
- Data inputs: Multi-touch with HTC Sense 1.0 interface
- Other: Proximity sensor, FM Radio, Facebook, Twitter, MS Exchange, compass, GPS, A-GPS, Google turn-by-turn navigation, Full Flash support enabled / FlashLite

The HTC Wildfire (also known as HTC Buzz) is a smartphone developed by the HTC Corporation, that was announced on 17 May 2010 and released in Europe in June of the same year. It is powered by a 528 MHz Qualcomm processor and runs the Android operating system, version 2.1, upgradeable to 2.2. It includes a TFT LCD capacitive touchscreen and a 5-megapixel camera. It has been described as a "Mini HTC Desire", and is perceived to be a follow-up model to the previous year's Tattoo.

The CDMA version of HTC Wildfire (also known as HTC Bee) was released on 29 October 2010, replacing GSM and HSPA with CDMA and EVDO connection technologies. It is bigger than the GSM version and the display has 256,000 colors.

== Availability ==
It was available via various mobile network operators in Europe, including the UK and Ireland.

In Australia, the carrier announced was Telstra. The Telstra branded HTC Wildfire is a special version supporting 850 MHz/2100 MHz UMTS, with the model number A3335.

In Taiwan, the carrier announced was Taiwan Mobile.

In Malaysia, the carrier announced was Maxis and U Mobile.

In Mexico, the carrier announced was Iusacell; however, it was incorrectly marked as the HTC Desire A.

In the United Kingdom, the carrier announced was T-Mobile UK, now EE, along with Vodafone.

It was available in Russia from 22 July 2010.

== Name ==
The name "Wildfire" was decided in a poll on Facebook, which resulted in 50% of the votes for "Wildfire" and 24% for "Zeal" which came in second place.

== Wildfire S ==
The HTC Wildfire S is a refresh version released a year later in 2011, which features many enhancements, including a screen with double the resolution of the Wildfire and RAM increased from 384 to 512 MB.

== Wildfire X ==
HTC Wildfire X, also named "HTC Wildfire Max" and "HTC Wildfire 10", was released on August 22, 2019, and manufactured by HTC Corporation and InOne Corporation. It has a 6.2" 720×1560 display, 3300 mAh non-replaceable battery, dual-SIM, microSD-expandable storage, and 12-Megapixel rear camera video recording with 1080p at 30fps. The variant with 32 GB internal storage has 3 GB of RAM, the variant with 128 GB internal storage has 4 GB RAM.

== Software updates ==
HTC announced in June 2010 that the HTC Wildfire was on their list of phones to receive the Android 2.2 "Froyo" update. The update to Android 2.2 includes support for USB tethering, enhanced bluetooth support, multiple keyboard languages, Wi-Fi hotspot tethering and more. However, live wallpapers and Adobe Flash Player support in the browser will not be supported.

A leaked build of Android 2.2 and 2.2.1 subsequently surfaced from China and Europe respectively, but with limited language support. It was modified and released by developers on the XDA Forums. In addition to this, several unofficial builds based on AOSP 2.2.1 and 2.3 have also surfaced on XDA.

On the morning of 20 December 2010, the 2.2 update was released as a modified build of the HTC Glacier's code. Many customers were surprised at the news, some previously so much as speculating that it would not appear, as the majority of Wildfire users had been waiting in anticipation for the update (heightened by limited news on the subject from HTC) since mid-2010.

Customers with unlocked HTC Wildfires received the update first, followed by operator-locked users that received the update shortly after the original release.

== Key software availability ==
Software	Availability
Email Reader	Yes
Play Store	Yes
Voice Search	Yes (requires download)
Photo Search	Yes (requires download)
Turn-by-turn GPS Navigation	Yes
Google Maps	Yes
Google Latitude (obsolete)	Yes
QR Code Reader	Yes (requires download)

== See also ==
- Galaxy Nexus
