= HTC Desire 616 =

Mid-range Android smartphone

- Manufacturer: HTC
- Dimensions: 142×71.9×9.2 mm (5.59×2.83×0.36 in)
- Weight: 150 g (5 oz)
- Operating system: Android 4.2.2 Jelly Bean, HTC Sense 5.5
- System-on-chip: MediaTek MT6592
- CPU: 1.4 GHz ARM Cortex-A7 octa-core CPU
- GPU: ARM Mali-450 MP4
- Memory: 1 GB RAM
- Storage: 4 GB
- Removable storage: microSD card support up to 32 GB
- Battery: 2000 mAh removable battery
- Rear camera: 8 MP; 1080p video recording
- Front camera: 2 MP
- Display: 5.0 inch TFT LCD, 720x1280 pixels (HD) resolution, 294 ppi pixel density
- Connectivity: Wi-Fi 802.11 b/g/n Bluetooth 4.0 microUSB 2.0; 3.5 mm headphone jack
- Data inputs: Accelerometer; Proximity sensor

The HTC Desire 616 is a mid-range Android smartphone released by HTC in 2014. It is the first HTC smartphone with an octa-core processor. It was launched on 7 July 2014 in Asian markets. On 11 July 2014, the phone was launched in India for 16900 INR.

== Specifications ==
=== Design ===
The HTC Desire 616 has a 5.0 inch display; there is an earpiece, sensors and a front-facing camera from left to right at the upper bezel of the display while there is an "HTC" logo in the middle at the lower bezel of the display. The side frame is made of plastic, and has rounded corners and a matte finish. On the side frame; there is a volume rocker and a power button at the right side, there is a 3.5 mm headphone jack at the top, and there is a microphone hole and a microUSB port at the bottom; the left side is empty. The back panel is removable and has an "HTC" logo; removing the back panel reveals a removable battery, a microSD card slot and two SIM card slots. There is a rear-facing camera, an LED flash and a speaker at the back.

The device measures 142 x 71.9 x 9.1 mm weighs 150 grams. It is available in black, white and red.

=== Hardware ===
The HTC Desire 616 is powered by MediaTek MT6592 system-on-chip with a 1.4 GHz ARM Cortex-A7 octa-core CPU and ARM Mali-450 MP4 GPU. It comes with 1 GB RAM and 4 GB internal storage expandable up to 32 GB through the microSD card slot. It has a 5.0 inch TFT LCD with 720x1280 pixels (HD) resolution and 294 ppi pixel density. The phone has an 8 MP rear-facing camera coupled with LED flash and a 2 MP front-facing camera. It has a 2000 mAh removable battery. Connectivity options include Wi-Fi 802.11 b/g/n and Bluetooth 4.0.

The HTC Desire 610 is a dual SIM device. It has a miniSIM (SIM1) and a microSIM (SIM2) slot. Both of the SIM card slots support quad-band GSM but only the SIM1 supports dual-band 3G connectivity. It has dual standby feature, thus both of the SIM cards are active unless a call is taking place; the SIM card that is on standby is disabled during the calls.

=== Software ===
The HTC Desire 616 runs on Android 4.2.2 Jelly Bean with HTC's user interface Sense 5.5 out of the box. It also has HTC Blinkfeed.

== Reception ==
The phone received mixed reviews.

Aloysius Low of CNET described the phone as "[a] good-looking device suffering from underwhelming performance".

Ershad Kaleebullah of NDTV was unwilling to recommend the phone when compared to similarly priced alternatives such as the Xiaomi Mi 3.

GSMArena reviewed the device. The battery life, the outdated Android operating system version and the camera quality were criticized.
