= HTC Wildfire X =

2019 smartphone model

- Brand: HTC
- Manufacturer: InOne Smart Technology
- Type: Smartphone
- Series: HTC Wildfire series
- First released: August 22, 2019; 7 years ago
- Discontinued: Yes
- Predecessor: HTC Wildfire S
- Related: HTC Wildfire E HTC Wildfire E1; HTC Wildfire E1 plus HTC Wildfire E1 lite
- Compatible networks: GSM, 3G, 4G (LTE)
- Form factor: Slate
- Color: Sapphire Blue
- Dimensions: 156.7 mm (6.17 in) H 74.9 mm (2.95 in) W 8.0 mm (0.31 in) D
- Weight: 160 g (5.6 oz)
- Operating system: Android 9.0 (Pie)
- System-on-chip: MediaTek MT6762 Helio P22 (12 nm)
- CPU: Octa-core 2.0 GHz Cortex-A53
- GPU: PowerVR GE8320
- Memory: 3 GB or 4 GB
- Storage: 32 GB or 128 GB eMMC 5.1
- Removable storage: microSDXC (uses shared SIM slot)
- SIM: Hybrid Dual SIM (Nano-SIM, dual stand-by)
- Battery: Non-removable, Li-Po 3300 mAh
- Charging: 10 W wired
- Rear camera: 12 MP, f/1.8 (wide), 1/2.8", 1.25µm, PDAF + 8 MP (telephoto), 2x optical zoom + 5 MP (depth); Dual-LED dual-tone flash, HDR, panorama Video: 1080p@30fps
- Front camera: 8 MP; Video: 1080p@30fps
- Display: IPS LCD, 6.2", 720 × 1520, 19:9 ratio, ~271 ppi

The HTC Wildfire X is an entry-level Android smartphone and released by HTC on August 22, 2019 in India after the announcement on August 14, 2019 and manufactured by InOne Smart Technology.

== Specfications ==
=== Hardware ===
The HTC Wildfire X features a 6.2-inch IPS LCD display with a resolution of 720 × 1520 pixels and a 19:9 aspect ratio (~271 ppi density). It measures 156.7 × 74.9 × 8 mm and weighs 160 grams.

The device is powered by the 12 nm MediaTek MT6762 Helio P22 system on a chip, featuring an octa-core 2.0 GHz Cortex-A53 CPU and a PowerVR GE8320 GPU.

It was released in two memory configurations: 3 GB of RAM with 32 GB of eMMC 5.1 internal storage, and 4 GB of RAM with 128 GB of internal storage. Storage can be expanded via a microSDXC card using the hybrid SIM slot. The phone is equipped with a non-removable 3300 mAh Li-Po battery that supports 10W wired charging.

=== Cameras ===
The smartphone features a triple rear camera arrangement" a 12 MP primary wide lens with f/1.8 aperture, 1/2.8" sensor size, 1.25µm pixel size, and phase-detection autofocus (PDAF), an 8 MP telephoto lens with 2x optical zoom. and a 5 MP auxiliary depth-sensing lens.

The rear camera system includes a Dual-LED dual-tone flash, HDR mode, and panorama support. It is capable of recording video at 1080p at 30 frames per second.

The front-facing camera consists of a single 8 MP sensor positioned in a waterdrop display notch, which also supports 1080p video recording at 30 fps.

=== Software ===
The HTC Wildfire X was shipped with Android 9 (Pie) out of the box.
