= HTC Desire 820 =

Android-based smartphone

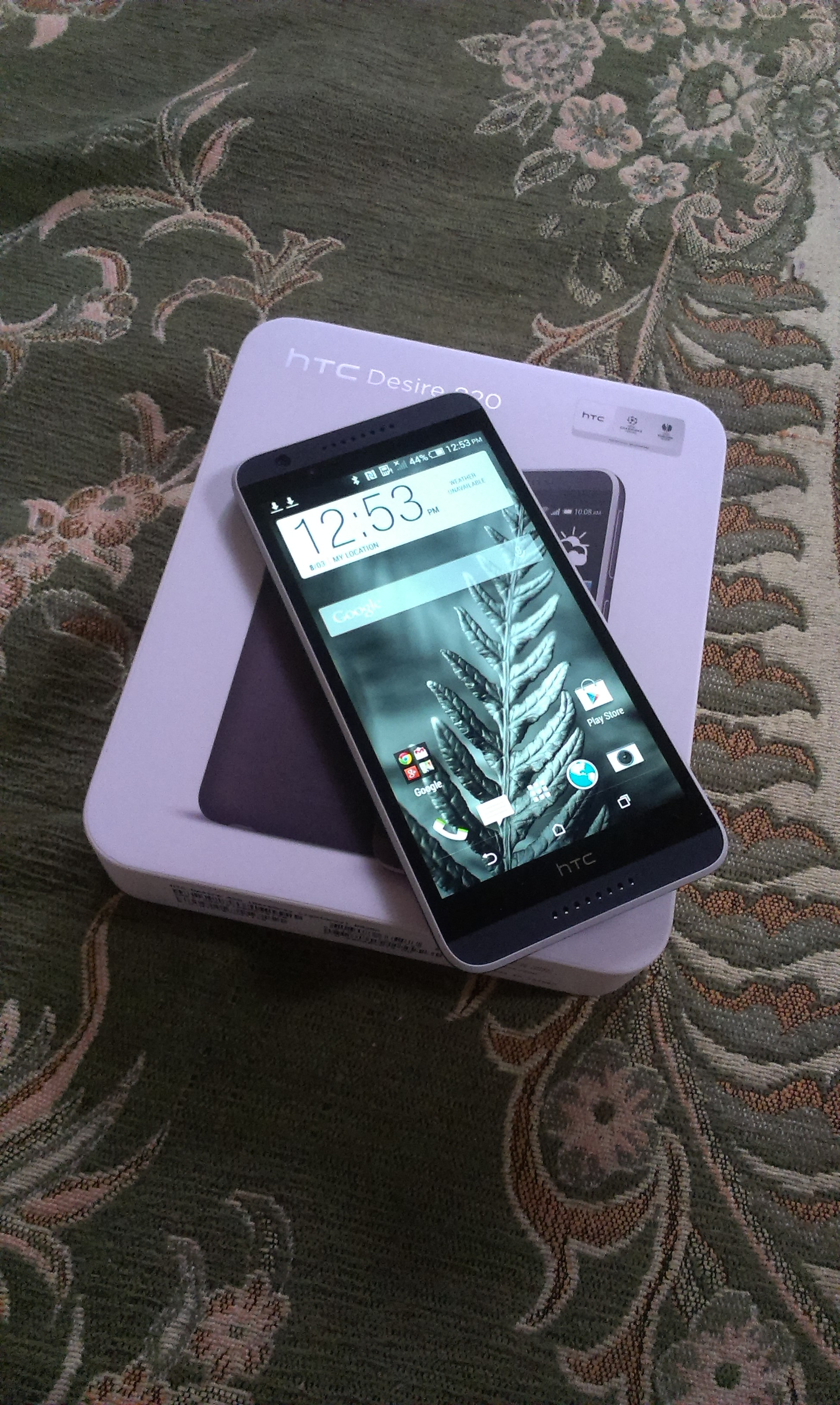
- HTC Desire 820 Running Android 4.4 KitKat. Sense 6
- Brand: HTC
- Manufacturer: HTC
- Series: Desire
- Predecessor: HTC Desire 816
- Form factor: Slate
- Operating system: Original: Android 4.4.2 "KitKat"; Current: Android 6.0.1 Marshmallow

The HTC Desire 820 is a mid range Android-based smartphone designed and manufactured by HTC aired and available from November 2014. It is the successor of HTC Desire 816. The smartphone features a 5.5-inch super LCD 2 display with a 1280x720 resolution. Unlike the scratch resistance glass panel of HTC Desire 816, it has Corning Gorilla Glass lll. Desire 820 supports full hd video recording and play back. It offers HTC Sense 6.5. The processor is a Qualcomm Snapdragon 615, 64 bit ARM Cortex A53 octa-core system on a chip (1.7 GHz quad core and quad core 1.0 GHz). It is accompanied by 2 GB RAM, 16 GB internal memory, 128 GB external memory capacity and a non removable 2600 mAh battery. It also comes with a 13.0 MP rear-facing camera and 8 MP front-facing camera. The smartphone came with Android KitKat version 4.4.2 and Android Marshmallow was released in 2016.

From March HTC desire 820 can have sense 7 home, like that of desire 816. The Desire 820 also has Dot view style orientation. Like HTC desire 816, the smartphone also supports aptX. With it user can experience CD quality sound through compatible Bluetooth devices.
