= HTC Desire 300 =

Smartphone

- Manufacturer: HTC
- Compatible networks: 2G; 3G
- Dimensions: 131.78×66.23×10.12 mm (5.188×2.607×0.398 in)
- Weight: 120 g (4 oz)
- Operating system: Android 4.1.2 Jelly Bean, HTC Sense 5.0
- System-on-chip: Qualcomm Snapdragon S4
- CPU: 1.0 GHz dual core ARM Cortex-A5
- GPU: Adreno 203
- Memory: 512 MB RAM
- Storage: 4 GB (Only 1.4 GB is user accessible)
- Removable storage: microSD card support up to 64 GB
- Battery: 1650 mAh removable battery
- Rear camera: 5 MP (f/2.8 aperture, 34mm focal length, autofocus, WVGA video recording)
- Front camera: VGA
- Display: 4.3 inch LCD; WVGA (480x800 pixels) resolution, 217 ppi pixel density
- Sound: Beats Audio
- Connectivity: Wi-Fi; Bluetooth 4.0; 3.5 mm headphone jack microUSB

The HTC Desire 300 is a low-end Android smartphone released by HTC in 2013. The phone was announced on 3 September 2013 in London, England. It was stated that the device would be available in October 2013 in select markets.

== Specifications ==
=== Design ===
The HTC Desire 300 has a 4.3-inch display with big bezels; there is an earpiece, an "HTC" logo and a front-facing camera at the upper bezel of the display and there are two capacitive buttons (back and home) buttons at the lower bezel of the display. On the side frame, there is a volume rocker at the right side, there is a power button and a headphone jack at the top and there is a micro-USB port and a microphone hole at the bottom while the left side is empty. The HTC Desire 300 has a unibody plastic cover that can be removed; removing the cover reveals a removable battery, a microSIM card slot and a microSD card slot for storage expansion. There is a rear-facing camera and a speaker alongside an "HTC" logo at the back.

The HTC Desire measures 131.78 x 66.23 x 10.12 mm and weighs 120 grams. It is available in black and white.

=== Hardware ===
The HTC Desire 300 is powered by Qualcomm Snapdragon S4 system-on-chip manufactured on a 45 nm process and consisting of a 1.0 GHz dual-core ARM Cortex-A5 CPU and Adreno 203 GPU. It comes with 512 MB RAM and 4 GB internal storage; however, only 1.4 GB of the 4 GB internal storage is user accessible. Internal storage can be expanded up to 64 GB by using a microSD card.

The HTC Desire 300 has a 4.3-inch LCD with 480x800 pixels (WVGA) resolution and 217 ppi pixel density. The phone has Beats Audio enhancements but lacks the BoomSound speakers.

The HTC Desire 300 has a 5-megapixel rear camera with f/2.8 aperture, 34mm focal length, autofocus and WVGA (800x480) video recording. It also has a VGA (0.3-megapixel) front-facing camera. None of the cameras is assisted by LED flash.

The HTC Desire 300 has a 1650 mAh removable battery. According to HTC, the phone can last up to 11 hours on 3G calls and up to 26 days on 3G stand-by.

=== Software ===
The HTC Desire 300 runs on Android 4.1.2 Jelly Bean with HTC's Sense user interface out of the box. It also includes HTC's Blinkfeed feature which displays a dynamic list of titles and social network updates on the home screen. It comes preinstalled with Google's software suite.
