= HTC Evo 4G+ =

Smartphone

HTC EVO 4G+
- Manufacturer: HTC Corporation
- Type: Smartphone
- Series: HTC Evo
- Availability by region: 2011, South Korea
- Predecessor: HTC Evo 4G
- Successor: HTC Evo 4G LTE
- Related: HTC Evo 3D
- Compatible networks: GSM/EDGE/GPRS (850/900/1800/1900 MHz); 3G WCDMA/HSPA (900/2100 MHz)
- Form factor: Slate
- Dimensions: 126 mm (5.0 in) H 65 mm (2.6 in) W 12.05 mm (0.474 in) D
- Weight: 160 g (5.6 oz)
- Operating system: Original: Android 2.3.4 "Gingerbread" with HTC Sense 3.0 overlay Current: Android 4.0.3 "Ice Cream Sandwich" with HTC Sense 3.6
- CPU: Dual-Core, 1.2 GHz Qualcomm MSM8260 (Snapdragon)
- GPU: Qualcomm Adreno 220
- Memory: 1 GB RAM
- Storage: 4 GB eMMC
- Removable storage: Micro-SDHC 8 GB (32 GB max)
- Battery: 1730 mAh Lithium-ion battery
- Rear camera: Backside illumination single 8-megapixel autofocus with dual LED flash, rear-facing
- Front camera: 1.3-megapixel, front-facing
- Display: 960×540 px, 4.3 in (10.9 cm) at 256 ppi qHD Capacitative Super-LCD (0.49 megapixels)
- Connectivity: EDGE 560 Kbps; GPRS 114 Kbps; 3G(WCDMA/UTMS 900/2100 MHz, ) 14.4 Mbps download speed 5.76 Mbps upload speed 4G(WiMAX/WiBro); Wi-Fi (802.11b/g/n); Bluetooth v3.0 + HS; Micro USB; HDMI (via MHL)
- Data inputs: Multi-touch touchscreen display 3-axis accelerometer 3-axis gyroscope Digital compass Proximity sensor Ambient light sensor
- Other: Wi-Fi Hotspot, USB tethering, FM-Radio, GPS navigation

HTC EVO 4G+ (codenamed HTC Rider) is an Android smartphone developed by HTC Corporation, released exclusively in South Korea through Korea Telecom in 2011. A variation of HTC Evo 3D, the device is distinguished by its single 8 MP rear camera, which means all the 3D specificities are gone, and is running on Korea Telecom's WiBro network.

== History ==
The phone is compatible with Korea Telecom's WiBro network, however, unlike its predecessor HTC Evo 4G, it is a GSM/UTMS cellphone. It was Korea's first 4G smartphone. The phone was launched to the public via a HTC EVO 4G+ experience space in the Gangnam Station underground shopping mall.
It is also known as HTC Rider, which is similar to HTC Raider, an LTE enabled device.

== Features ==
=== Processor ===
The Evo 4G+ uses a Snapdragon S3 chipset with a dual core 1.2 GHz processor, and includes 1 GB of RAM.

=== Screen ===
The Evo 4G+ has a 4.3 inch qHD screen with Super LCD.

=== Camera ===
Unlike its counterpart, HTC Evo 3D, the Evo 4G+ has only one single rear-facing 8-megapixel camera, capable of capturing videos in 1080p resolution in 2D. It features a single 1.3-megapixel front-facing camera.

=== Software ===
The Evo 4G+ shipped with Android 2.3 and the HTC Sense 3.0 interface. An update was released on June 19, 2012 to upgrade the phone to Android 4.0.3 with Sense 3.6.

=== Storage ===
The Evo 4G+ features 4 GB internal storage (about 1.3 GB available) and a pre-installed 8 GB microSDHC card.

== See also ==
- List of Android devices
