= HTC Evo =

HTC Evo is a discontinued line of mobile phones developed by HTC Corporation. Individual models include:

- HTC Evo 3D a.k.a. HTC Evo V
- HTC Evo 4G a.k.a. HTC Evo WiMAX ISW11HT/HTC Supersonic
- HTC Evo 4G LTE
- HTC Evo 4G+
- HTC Evo Design 4G a.k.a. HTC Hero S
- HTC Evo Shift 4G
- HTC Evo View 4G a.k.a. HTC Flyer
