= HTC Evo Design 4G =

2011 Android smartphone

HTC EVO Design 4G
- Manufacturer: HTC
- Type: Smartphone
- Series: HTC Evo
- First released: October 23, 2011 (Sprint); May 30, 2012 (Boost)
- Predecessor: HTC Hero
- Related: HTC Evo 4G; HTC Evo Shift 4G; HTC Evo 3D; HTC Evo 4G LTE
- Compatible networks: CDMA EVDO WiMAX HSPA UMTS GSM GPRS EDGE
- Form factor: Slate
- Dimensions: 4.8 in (120 mm) H 2.4 in (61 mm) W 0.47 in (12 mm) D
- Weight: 5.22 oz (148 g)
- Operating system: Android 4.0.3
- CPU: Qualcomm Snapdragon S2 MSM 8655; Process: 45nm CPU IS: ARMv7; CPU: 1.2 GHz Scorpion; Cores: 1 GPU: Adreno 205; Memory: DC 333 MHz LPDDR2
- Memory: 768 MB
- Storage: 4 GB
- Removable storage: 8 GB (class 4) included
- Battery: 1520 mAh rechargeable Li-ion
- Rear camera: 5 MP; Color CMOS auto focus F2.2
- Front camera: 1.3 MP
- Display: Super LCD qHD 960x540 16:9; 4.0 in (100 mm) diagonal 16M colors
- Connectivity: Bluetooth 3.0; Wi-Fi IEEE 802.11 b/g/n 3.5mm headphone jack Micro USB
- Data inputs: Multi-touch, capacitive touchscreen

The HTC EVO Design 4G (also known as the HTC Hero S on US Cellular and CSpire) is an Android powered smartphone released by Sprint Nextel on October 23, 2011 and by Boost Mobile on May 30, 2012. It is the fourth HTC phone in their EVO line. Notable features include a qHD display, an aluminum semi-monocoque form, world phone connectivity (multi-band), and a smaller overall size compared to most Android phones. The single-core processor and questionable battery life have left the phone with a mixed reception. The EVO Design 4G is also Sprint's last 4G phone utilizing its WiMAX network.

On May 30, 2012, Boost Mobile released the EVO Design 4G as a pre-paid phone, shipping with Android 4.0 and Sense 3.6 pre-installed, an update that later became available for the Sprint version.

== Hardware ==
The HTC EVO Design 4G exterior consists of a glass screen with an aluminum bezel. The aluminum wraps around to the back of the phone, but only covers the middle portion of the back. This allows for plastic access panels to be placed at the top and bottom of the back, which also improve grip.

== Software ==
The phone initially came with Android 2.3.4 (Gingerbread) installed. A future upgrade to Android 4.0 (Ice Cream Sandwich) was announced by HTC in March 2012. The phone received the upgrade to Android version 4.03 in July 2012.

The stock Android operating system was initially layered with HTC Sense version 3.0, which is software that visually changes the user experience. The benefit of this software has been met with mixed reviews. While some prefer the additional visual effects, opponents argue the cost of performance is not worth it. The upgrade to Android 4.03 also updated HTC Sense to version 3.6.

== Availability ==
The phone is available in the United States on the Sprint Nextel and Boost Mobile networks.

The HTC Hero S is available on US Cellular
