= HTC ThunderBolt =

Android smartphone manufactured by HTC

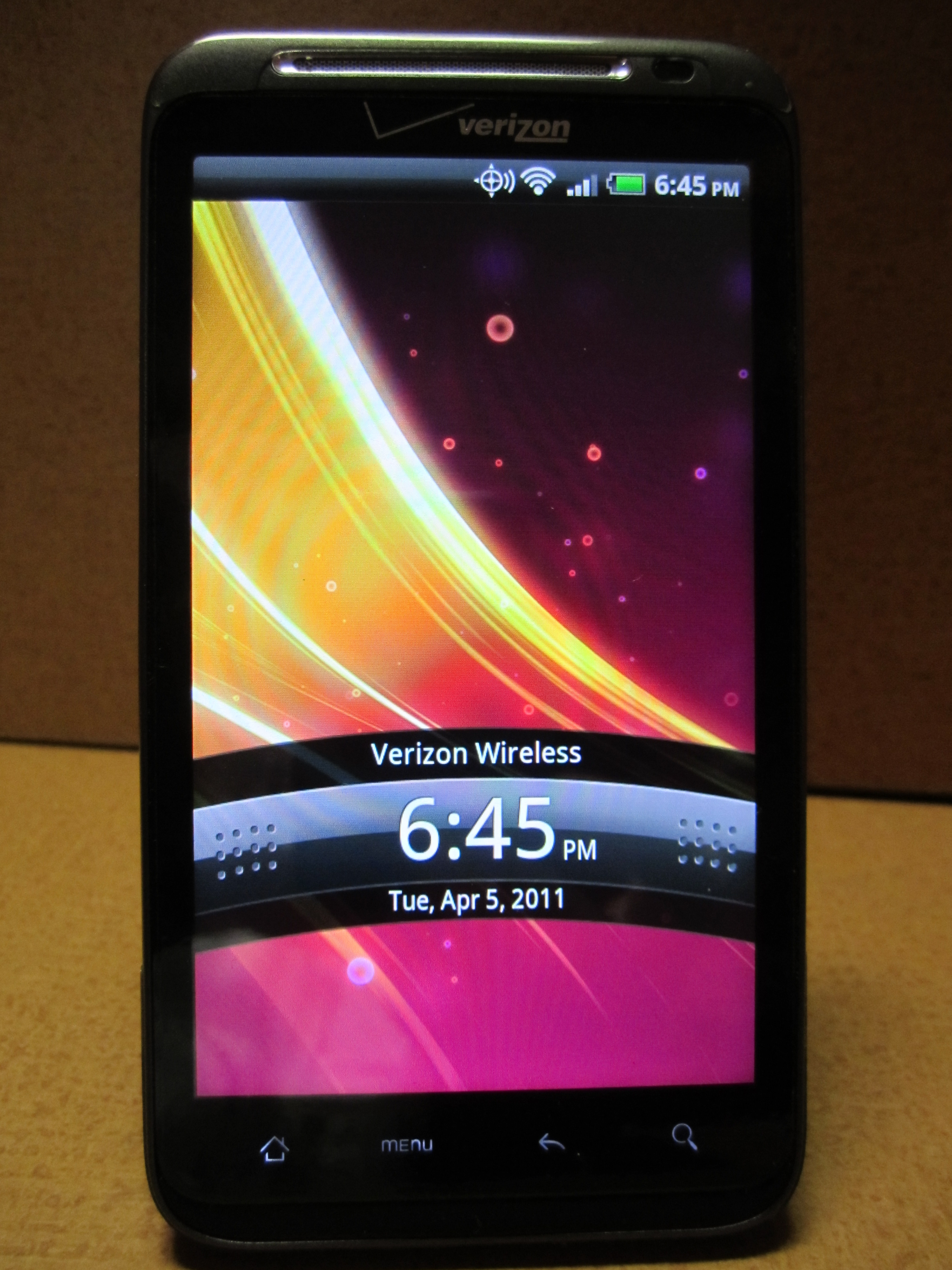
- HTC ThunderBolt (Verizon Wireless)
- Brand: HTC
- Manufacturer: HTC Corporation
- Type: Smartphone
- Series: Desire HD
- First released: January 2011
- Availability by region: February 2011
- Discontinued: June 2012
- Predecessor: HTC Droid Incredible
- Successor: HTC Rezound
- Related: HTC Desire HD, HTC Inspire 4G, HTC Sensation 4G, HTC EVO 4G, HTC EVO 4G LTE
- Compatible networks: Dual-band CDMA/EVDO Rev. A/EHRPD (800 1900 MHz); LTE 700 MHz (band 13)
- Form factor: Slate
- Dimensions: 4.85 in (123 mm) H 2.65 in (67 mm) W 0.54 in (14 mm) D
- Weight: 6.23 oz (177 g)
- Operating system: Android 2.2 "Froyo" with HTC Sense 2.0; Upgradeable to Android 4.0.4 Ice Cream Sandwich with HTC Sense 3.6
- CPU: 1 GHz Qualcomm Snapdragon (MSM8655)
- GPU: Adreno 205
- Memory: 768 MB RAM
- Storage: 8 GB eMMC (2.58 GB available)
- Removable storage: 32 GB microSD card pre-installed
- Battery: 1400 mAh
- Rear camera: 8.0 Mpx with autofocus, 2 LED flash, with 720p HD video capture
- Front camera: 1.3 Mpx front-facing, with video capture
- Display: 4.27 in (108 mm) diagonal 1.67:1 aspect ratio widescreen TFT LCD capacitive touchscreen 480x800 resolution at 215 ppi (0.38 Mpx); Corning Gorilla Glass, crack and scratch resistant
- Connectivity: CDMA 800/1900 MHz EVDO Rev. A, 4G LTE 700 MHz, Wi-Fi (802.11b/g/n); Bluetooth 2.1 (upgradeable to 3.0) with A2DP stereo and EDR; A-GPS; FM tuner with RDS, 3.5 mm stereo audio jack, Micro-USB, Mobile Hotspot
- Data inputs: Touch or Swype
- Hearing aid compatibility: M4/T3

The HTC ThunderBolt (ADR6400L) is the first 4G LTE smartphone on the Verizon Wireless network. It is a CDMA/LTE variant of the HTC Desire HD. It was first announced at CES on January 6, 2011.

In addition to 4G service, the ThunderBolt is the first Verizon phone to support simultaneous voice/data over 3G without the help of Wi-Fi.

== Launch ==
The phone was launched on January 17, 2011. Best Buy was the first retailer to offer a pre-order on February 6, 2011. Wirefly and Amazon both allowed pre-orders a few days before the device's official launch. This launch date, however, was much later than anticipated by consumers, frustrating many potential buyers.

There was so much pent-up demand for the ThunderBolt that it broke pre-sale records for at least one online vendor.

However, despite early demand for the phone, HTC has appeared to struggle to address multiple complaints about the device. Some features were removed just before release, including a built-in Skype app with video calling. Common reported issues include short battery life, frequent reboots, and a much-delayed, troubled rollout of an update to the Android Gingerbread platform.

== Hardware ==
The ThunderBolt has a second-generation 1GHz Snapdragon processor manufactured by Qualcomm, and runs on Verizon's 4G LTE Network. It has a 4.3-inch class (480×800) WVGA TFT capacitive touchscreen covered by Gorilla Glass, a special crack and scratch resistant material made by Corning. Two cameras are included; an 8-megapixel rear-facing camera, able to record 720p video, with a dual-LED flash, and a 1.3-megapixel front-facing camera. The phone has 768 MB of RAM and 8 GB of eMMC internal flash memory (available to user apps & user app data). An external microSDHC card slot supports up to 32 GB of additional storage, which is preinstalled. The ThunderBolt also comes with a kickstand that works in landscape and portrait positions for photo or video viewing. An LED notification light is located near the earpiece.

== Software ==
The ThunderBolt shipped with Android 2.2 (Froyo), and it was later updated in September 2011 to Android 2.3 (Gingerbread). In early February 2013, the ThunderBolt was updated to Android 4.0.4 (Ice Cream Sandwich) and Sense 3.6.

The 4.0.4 update brought many new features to the Thunderbolt, including new camera filters and features, the ability to capture screenshots, and facial recognition for device unlocking. It also improved the device's stability and connectivity issues. Connectivity issues were the reason why HTC and Verizon Wireless did not immediately release the 4.0.4 update. The "Fit the puzzle piece" unlock screen prompt was replaced by “Drag down to unlock.”

Another new feature with the 4.0.4 update was the built-in data manager. This feature helps users manage and view their recent data usage. This feature would show a graph of data usage for the time period that the user had previously set. The feature would also track the user's data usage and alert them when they were close to their previously set data limit.

== See also ==
- Android (operating system)
- HTC Desire HD
- HTC Inspire 4G
