= HTC Desire HD =

Android smartphone manufactured by HTC

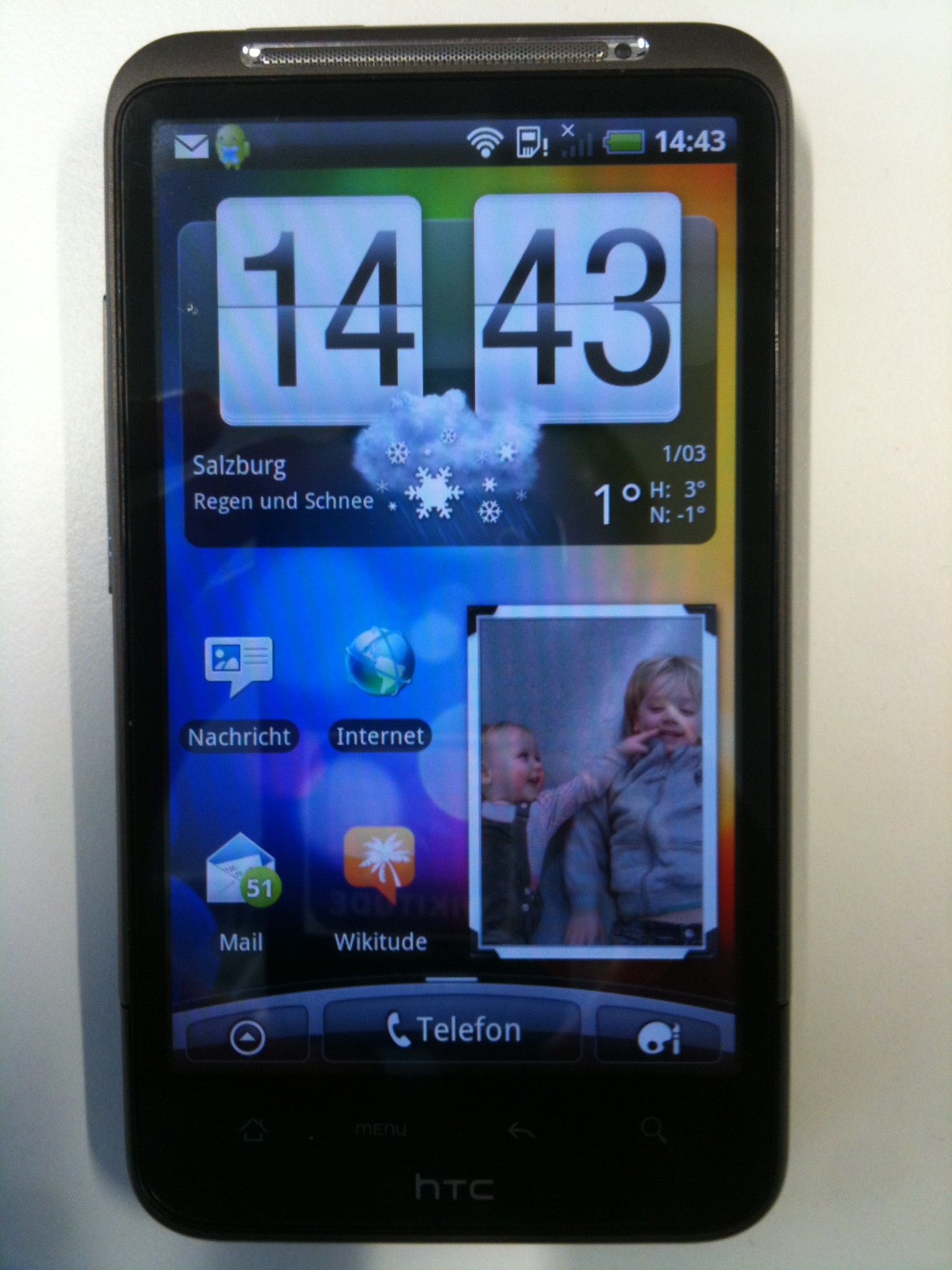
- Manufacturer: HTC Corporation
- Type: Smartphone
- Availability by region: UK October 19, 2010
- Predecessor: HTC Desire
- Successor: HTC Sensation
- Form factor: Slate
- Dimensions: 123 mm (4.8 in) L 68 mm (2.7 in) W 11.8 mm (0.46 in) D
- Weight: 164 g (5.8 oz)
- Operating system: Android 2.2 "Froyo" with HTC Sense; Upgradeable to 2.3.5 "Gingerbread" with HTC Sense 3.0. Newer versions of Android are available through third-party ROMs.
- CPU: 1 GHz Qualcomm 8255 Snapdragon
- GPU: Adreno 205
- Memory: 768 MB RAM
- Storage: 1.5 GB ROM
- Removable storage: up to 32 GB with microSD
- Battery: Li-ion 1230 mAh 3.7VDC 4.55Whr
- Rear camera: 8-megapixel autofocus with dual LED flash and 720p HD video recording.
- Display: 4.3 in (110 mm) 480x800 TFT S-LCD Multi-touchscreen
- Connectivity: 2G: 850/900/1800/1900 MHz; 3G: 900/2100 MHz; HSDPA: 14.4 Mbps; HSUPA: 5.76 Mbps; Wi-Fi: 802.11b/g/n Bluetooth: v2.1 with Enhanced Data Rate
- Codename: Ace
- Other: FM tuner, Compass, A-GPS, DLNA support, micro-USB, 3.5 mm audio jack, and Wi-Fi tethering

The HTC Desire HD (codenamed "HTC Ace") is an Android smartphone by HTC Corporation. It was unveiled at a press event in London hosted by HTC on September 15, 2010, and was made available for sale in October in Europe and in January 2011 in Canada. The Desire was HTC's fourth flagship Android device until the release of their new line of flagship model, the HTC Sensation.

== Hardware ==
The smartphone has an aluminium unibody design with Android 2.3.5 (Gingerbread) and HTC Sense installed. On the back, there are two plastic covers, one contains the battery, while the other contains the SIM card and the microSDHC card. It features a 4.3-inch gorilla glass WVGA TFT LCD capacitive touchscreen, 8-megapixel camera (can record 720p video) and support for HSPA/W-CDMA and quad-band GSM/GPRS/EDGE.

It is the first phone to use the new 1 GHz MSM8255 Scorpion CPU. This second generation Snapdragon processor uses a low-power 45-nm process technology for higher integration and efficiency, and the Adreno 205 doubles the performance of the Adreno 200 GPU. This allows for longer talk and standby times than the original HTC Desire even with a smaller capacity battery.

The HTC Desire HD has 768 MB RAM and 1.5 GB of internal flash memory data storage. There is also a single microSDHC slot, which can accept a microSDHC/XC card with a capacity of up to 64 GB of data storage.

== Software ==
The HTC Desire HD incorporates Dolby Mobile, Sound Retrieval System WOW Surround Sound, DLNA, Adobe Flash 10.2, and DivX/Xvid video playback support, however, not many audio codecs are supported and apps have to be downloaded in order to support more formats.

At launch, HTC unveiled the updated HTC Sense features, including a new web site that allows remote interaction with HTC Sense enabled handsets for backups, security features, and other handset interactions. For example, it can remotely lock and wipe the handset of all sensitive data, while the service also creates automatic backups of contacts, text messages, call history, customizations, etc. HTCSense.com will also send commands to the handset to set the ring volume to maximum volume even if it is on silent mode and give a location on a map.

The new HTC Sense brings some enhanced multimedia abilities giving users more options to create and share content (including new photo and video effects). It also includes location-based maps, which can be pre-loaded or cached and thus delivered without download delays or incurring mobile roaming charges. Also included is a new e-book store and a dedicated e-reader with annotation, search and translation abilities. It also provides a social networking hub, known as Friendstream which allows users to monitor their Facebook, Twitter, as well as other social networks all in one page.

Also, the new HTC Sense adds a new feature, Fastboot, which improves the HTC Desire HD's startup time, from more than 40 seconds to less than 5 seconds. Technically, the phone is placed in a low-power sleep mode when powered off and wakes up when started up. Because of this fact, if the battery is removed and reinserted, the phone takes about a minute to boot.

The HTC Desire HD has received a new software update in December 2010, the Android 2.2.1 version 1.72.405.3 which brings various improvements and some bug fixes. As of January 2011 the 2.2.1 v 1.72.405.3 software update was pulled due to issues with the HTC Sense overlay.

During May 2011 in Western Europe, an over the air update updated unlocked, unbranded Desire HDs to Android 2.3.3 Gingerbread and HTC Sense 2.1. On June 12 in Australia, an over the air update was available for unbranded Desire HDs taking them to Android 2.3.3 Gingerbread with HTC Sense 2.1. In July 2011, HTC announced via Facebook that it was testing Gingerbread for branded Desire HDs and HTC released the update at the end of July. With the Android 2.3.3 Gingerbread Update, the Desire HD now has the ability to set Wi-Fi proxy settings which was not available previously with Android 2.2 Froyo and has Sense 2.1.

In September 2011 it was reported that HTC plan to update the Desire HD to Android version 2.3.5, which would provide, for example, voice and video calling with Google Talk.

On December 16, 2011, in Europe, an over the air update updated unlocked, unbranded Desire HDs to Android 2.3.5 Gingerbread and HTC Sense 3.0.

On February 9, 2012, HTC announced in their Facebook page stating that Desire HDs would be upgraded to Android 4.0 Ice Cream Sandwich in late 2012. This update was then cancelled on July 20, 2012, with HTC posting the following statement a week later to explain their position:

We’ve heard your feedback on our decision not to update the HTC Desire HD to Android 4.0. We completely understand that this is a controversial decision.

For more background, due to how storage on the HTC Desire HD is partitioned – and the larger size of Android 4.0 – it would require re-partitioning device storage and overwriting user data in order to install this update. While technically advanced users might find this solution acceptable, the majority of customers would not. We also considered ways to reduce the overall size of the software package, but this would impact features and functionality that customers are currently using. Even after installing the update, there were other technical limitations which we felt negatively impacted the user experience.

We believe an update should always improve the user experience and carefully evaluate each update based on this criteria. While we are very aware of the disappointment from this decision, we believe the impact to user experience was too great. We recognize this is a change from our previous statement and for that we’re truly sorry.

As of September 2012, several community builds (ROMs) of ICS have been released for the device, such as Team Blackout's ICS Incredible (based on the official ICS build for the HTC's Incredible S), AOSPx, and Ice Cold Sandwich.

As of October 2013, several community Android ROMs of Jelly Bean (versions 4.1, 4.2.2 and 4.3.1) have been released for the device, such as JellyTime (compiled from CyanogenMod 10) and codefireX builds.

== Variants ==
There are multiple variants of the Desire HD in the USA. AT&T Mobility in the US has a variant of the HD called the HTC Inspire 4G, one of AT&T's first 4G HSPA+ devices. Verizon Wireless has a LTE-enabled variant, the HTC Thunderbolt, which has a slightly modified design which includes a front-facing camera.

== Reception ==
The HTC Desire HD has received generally positive reviews from critics. CNET UK gave it a 4.5/5 and called the Desire HD the "ultimate smartphone", claiming it is "impressive and monumental". SlashGear praised it as a "thinner, more pocket-friendly handset" than the HTC EVO 4G. Engadget criticised some of the device's build quirks and battery life but gave the phone a score of 7/10. TechRadar praised the device giving it 4.5/5 stars, describing it as "...the very latest in cool smartphone technology that actually works." Gizmodo praised it as "A 720p-Shooting Android Behemoth" though they felt that it was a little too big for comfort.

=== Sales ===
In the UK, Orange, T-Mobile and Vodafone struggled to maintain enough stock to meet demand.

=== Problems ===
The cover that is responsible for encasing the Micro SD card and SIM card is very prone to damage, however, it does not fully crack but it does slide off with ease.

== See also ==
- Galaxy Nexus
- Android (operating system)
- HTC Inspire 4G
- HTC Thunderbolt
