= HTC Rezound =

Smartphone by HTC

- Brand: HTC
- Manufacturer: HTC Corporation
- Type: Smartphone
- Availability by region: November 14, 2011 (USA)
- Predecessor: HTC Amaze 4G; HTC Sensation; HTC Thunderbolt
- Successor: Droid DNA
- Related: HTC Sensation XE; HTC Raider 4G
- Compatible networks: Dual-band CDMA/EVDO Rev. A (800 1900 MHz); LTE 700 MHz (band 13)
- Form factor: Slate
- Dimensions: 129 mm (5.1 in) (h); 65.5 mm (2.58 in) (w); 13.65 mm (0.537 in) (d)
- Weight: 170 g (6 oz)
- Operating system: Android 2.3.4 Gingerbread with HTC Sense 3.5; Android 4.0.4 update with HTC Sense 3.6
- CPU: 1.5 GHz Dual-Core Qualcomm Snapdragon S3 MSM8660
- GPU: Adreno 220
- Memory: 1 GB
- Storage: 16 GB
- Removable storage: microSD card (up to 64 GB)
- Battery: 1620 mAh Lithium-ion battery
- Rear camera: 8 MP autofocus with dual LED flash
- Front camera: 2 MP fixed-focus
- Display: 4.3" 720x1280 Super LCD HD Display (342 ppi)
- Connectivity: aGPS, Bluetooth v3.0, Wi-Fi: 802.11 a/b/g/n
- Codename: HTC Vigor
- SAR: Head 1.25 W/kg; Body 1.12 W/kg
- Hearing aid compatibility: M4, T4

The HTC Rezound is a smartphone by HTC and sold through Verizon. Along with the Galaxy Nexus and Droid RAZR, it was expected to be a major competitor to the iPhone 4S. It was released on November 14, 2011. It is also the first phone to use Beats Audio technology, and comes with a special pair of the Beats by Dr. Dre's iBeats earphones with black earpieces and red wiring.

Before its initial release, the phone was rumored to be the replacement for the ThunderBolt, and even nicknamed the "Thunderbolt 2" in the enthusiast community. The HTC Rezound is the second Verizon Wireless phone available that allows simultaneous surf and talk on the Verizon Wireless 4G LTE network. This capability is due to the duplication of some functions between the Qualcomm Snapdragon S3 MSM8660 SoC (System on Chip) and the Qualcomm MSM9600 modem chip. The Snapdragon SoC provides all CDMA2000 functionality, including voice, while the MSM9600 duplicates CDMA2000 data functionality with the addition of GSM-derived LTE (Long Term Evolution) functionality. This also gave the HTC Rezound the ability to simultaneous surf and talk in 3G environments. This arrangement also calls for radio antenna redundancy. The phone has a 4.3-inch 1280×720 display and was tied with the Sony Xperia S for the highest pixel density in any smartphone released (342 PPI) until the arrival of HTC Butterfly/Droid DNA with a 5-inch 1920×1080 resolution screen (440 PPI).

On August 2, 2012, Verizon Wireless officially announced the Android 4.0 (Ice Cream Sandwich) update for the HTC Rezound. The update became available to customers on that day, updating users to Android 4.0.3 with Sense 3.6.

On November 13, 2012, Verizon Wireless announced the Droid DNA, a variant of the HTC Butterfly with a 5-inch 1920×1080 display. While not a direct replacement for the Rezound, this device was similarly styled and took its place as HTC's flagship offering for Verizon. The Rezound was discontinued shortly thereafter.

== See also ==
- HTC Corporation
- Galaxy Nexus
- Motorola Droid RAZR
- HTC Droid DNA
