= HTC Inspire 4G =

HTC Cell Phone

- Manufacturer: HTC Corporation
- First released: 13 February 2011; 15 years ago
- Successor: HTC Vivid 4G
- Related: HTC Desire HD
- Form factor: Slate smartphone
- Dimensions: 122 mm (4.8 in) H 68 mm (2.7 in) W 12 mm (0.47 in) D
- Weight: 164 g (5.78 oz)
- Operating system: Android 2.3.5 with HTC Sense 3.0; Released 31 July 2012
- CPU: 1 GHz Qualcomm Snapdragon MSM8255
- GPU: Adreno 205
- Memory: 768 MB RAM
- Storage: 4 GB ROM
- Removable storage: 8 GB microSD, up to 32 GB supported
- Battery: 1230 mAh Lithium-ion battery
- Rear camera: 8 megapixel autofocus with dual LED flash, backside illumination
- Front camera: None
- Display: 4.3 in (11 cm) class diagonal widescreen 480x800 S-LCD TFT LCD at 217 ppi
- Sound: Dolby Mobile and SRS sound enhancement
- Connectivity: 2.5G (GSM/GPRS/EDGE): 850/900/1800/1900 MHz; 3GPP (HSPA+ 850/1900 MHz); Wi-Fi (802.11 b/g/n); Bluetooth 3.0; USB 2.0, DLNA
- Data inputs: Multi-touch touchscreen display Dual microphone 3-axis accelerometer Digital compass Proximity sensor Ambient light sensor
- Codename: Stallion
- Other: Wi-Fi Hot Spot, FM radio, A-GPS, 3.5 mm stereo audio jack, Micro-USB

The HTC Inspire 4G is the first smartphone available on AT&T Mobility branded as "4G". It was first announced at CES in January 2011 and was released in February 2011. The Inspire 4G is a variant of the HTC Desire HD that was sold in Europe so the Inspire has the same design and similar specifications except that the Inspire supports AT&T's HSPA+ 4G network.

== Hardware ==
The Inspire features a 1 GHz Qualcomm Snapdragon processor and an 8 MP camera and dual LED flash, in-camera editing, live picture effects, and a 720p camcorder to capture HD video. It has a 4.3-inch class (480×800) WVGA (16M Colors) TFT capacitive touchscreen covered by Gorilla Glass, a special crack and scratch resistant material made by Corning with multi-touch input support.

The HTC Inspire 4G has 768 MB RAM and 4 GB of internal flash memory data storage. There is also a single microSDHC slot, which can accept a microSDHC card with a capacity of up to 32 GB of data storage.

== Software ==
The Inspire launched with Android 2.2.1 Froyo with the custom HTC Sense 2.0 skin as the user interface. The OS was later updated on 8 August 2011 to Android 2.3.3 with Sense 2.1 and again on 31 July 2012 to Android 2.3.5 with Sense 3.0.

In May 2011, AT&T issued an update allowing unknown sources to be installed, which allows users to sideload applications. On 25 July 2011 AT&T issued Android 2.3.3 Gingerbread, HTC Sense 2.1, and various fixes to the phone.

On 31 July 2012 HTC released software update 3.20.502.52 OTA. New features included: Android 2.3.5, HTC Sense 3.0, Task Manager, and AT&T Address Book. Fixes/Updates included: Call optimization improvements, improved security functionality, SMS/MMS contact display fix, background data use improvement, and slightly longer battery life. This was the last official update for the phone's operating system. In March 2013, AT&T issued a security update for various HTC and carrier applications used in the previous software update.

In the xda-developers forum, user software is available for the device with Android 4.4.4 via Cyanogenmod 11.

== HSUPA issues ==
Original specs pointed out the existence of HSUPA to enhance the upload speeds under the 3G network, but as early adopters inquired about slow upload connections, AT&T replied that the Inspire 4G is not HSUPA capable. However, the Inspire 4G is fully capable of HSUPA, but it was disabled by AT&T for unknown reasons. By 30 April 2011 AT&T issued an over the air (OTA) update enabling HSUPA for the HTC Inspire 4G.

== See also ==
- HTC Thunderbolt
