= HTC Butterfly S =

Android smartphone designed and manufactured by HTC

HTC Butterfly (s)

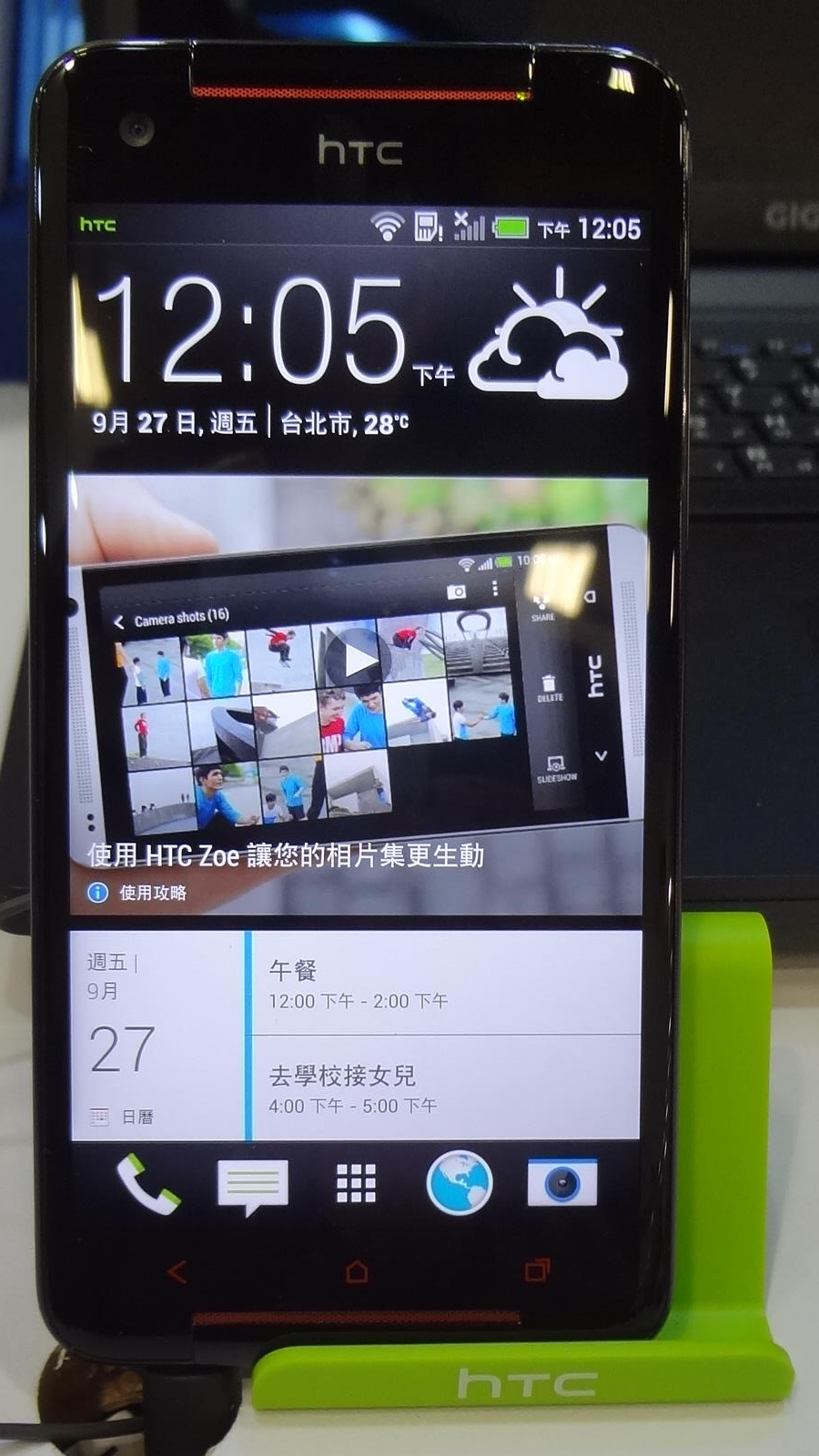
- Manufacturer: HTC
- Type: Smartphone
- Series: HTC Butterfly
- First released: June 2013
- Predecessor: HTC Butterfly/Droid DNA
- Related: HTC One
- Form factor: Slate
- Dimensions: 144.5 mm (5.69 in) H 70.5 mm (2.78 in) W 10.6 mm (0.42 in) D (max); 4 mm (0.16 in) D (min)
- Weight: 160 g (5.6 oz)
- Operating system: Android 4.2.2 Jelly Bean with HTC Sense 5.0 (Taiwanese version officially upgradeable to Android 5.0.2 Lollipop with HTC Sense 6.5)
- System-on-chip: Qualcomm Snapdragon 600 APQ8064
- CPU: 1.9 GHz quad-core Krait 300
- GPU: Adreno 320
- Memory: 2 GB LPDDR2 RAM
- Storage: 16 GB
- Removable storage: up to 64 GB microSDXC
- Battery: 3,200 mAh Li-Po
- Rear camera: 4.0-megapixel, 2.0 μm camera with autofocus, UltraPixel BSI image sensor, smart LED flash, F2.0 aperture, 28 mm lens, dedicated imaging chip, continuous shooting, optical image stabilization 1080p HD video recording, video stabilization, slow motion video capture (768 × 432 pixels), HDR video recording
- Front camera: 2.1-megapixel front camera (1080p for recording and video chat)
- Display: 5.0 in (130 mm) Super LCD 3 with RGB matrix 1920×1080 pixels (16:9 Aspect ratio) (441 ppi); Corning Gorilla Glass 3.0
- Sound: Qualcomm DAC
- Connectivity: Wi-Fi: 802.11 a/b/g/n/ac (2.4/5 GHz); GPS & GLONASS; NFC; Bluetooth: 4.0 with aptX; DLNA; Wi-Fi Direct; Miracast; Wi-Fi Hotspot; Infrared; USB 2.0 (Micro-B Port, USB charging); USB On-The-Go 1.3; MHL 2.0; HDMI; Wireless HDMI; 3.5 millimetres (0.14 in) TRRS
- Other: Accelerometer, gyroscope, digital compass, proximity sensor, ambient light sensor

The HTC Butterfly S (stylized as the Butterfly s) is an Android smartphone designed and manufactured by HTC. It is exclusive to Asian countries and currently has not been officially released in North America or Europe. The Butterfly S was unveiled on 19 June 2013 for release in Asian markets by July 2013. It is the predecessor to the HTC Butterfly (known as the HTC Droid DNA when released in the United States by Verizon Wireless), and incorporates hardware and software features first introduced by the HTC One (such as Sense 5, the UltraPixel image sensor, the Zoe camera features, and dual front-facing stereo speakers), but is distinguished from the One by a larger, 5-inch 1080p display, a larger 3200 mAh battery and a Snapdragon 600 quad-core processor clocked at 1.9 GHz. The Butterfly S has a shiny plastic unibody compared to the aluminum unibody of the One, and has three capacitive buttons instead of two. It lacks the optical image stabilization of the One and the waterproofing of the original Butterfly. It has 16 GB of internal storage and a microSD card slot for storage up to 64 GB. The international 901s variant sold in Asian countries such as Singapore and Hong Kong has support for 4G LTE. The original Taiwanese version (901e) does not have LTE support and is currently available unlocked or on a contract with various carriers (initially only Chunghwa Telecom. An LTE version for Taiwan was announced in January 2014, following the implementation of LTE by various Taiwanese carriers. In China, two variants were released, a regular version with a 3200 mAh battery and a dual SIM version with a 2300 mAh battery. Only the Taiwanese variants officially received Android 5.0.2 Lollipop.
