= HTC Butterfly =

Android-based smartphone manufactured by HTC

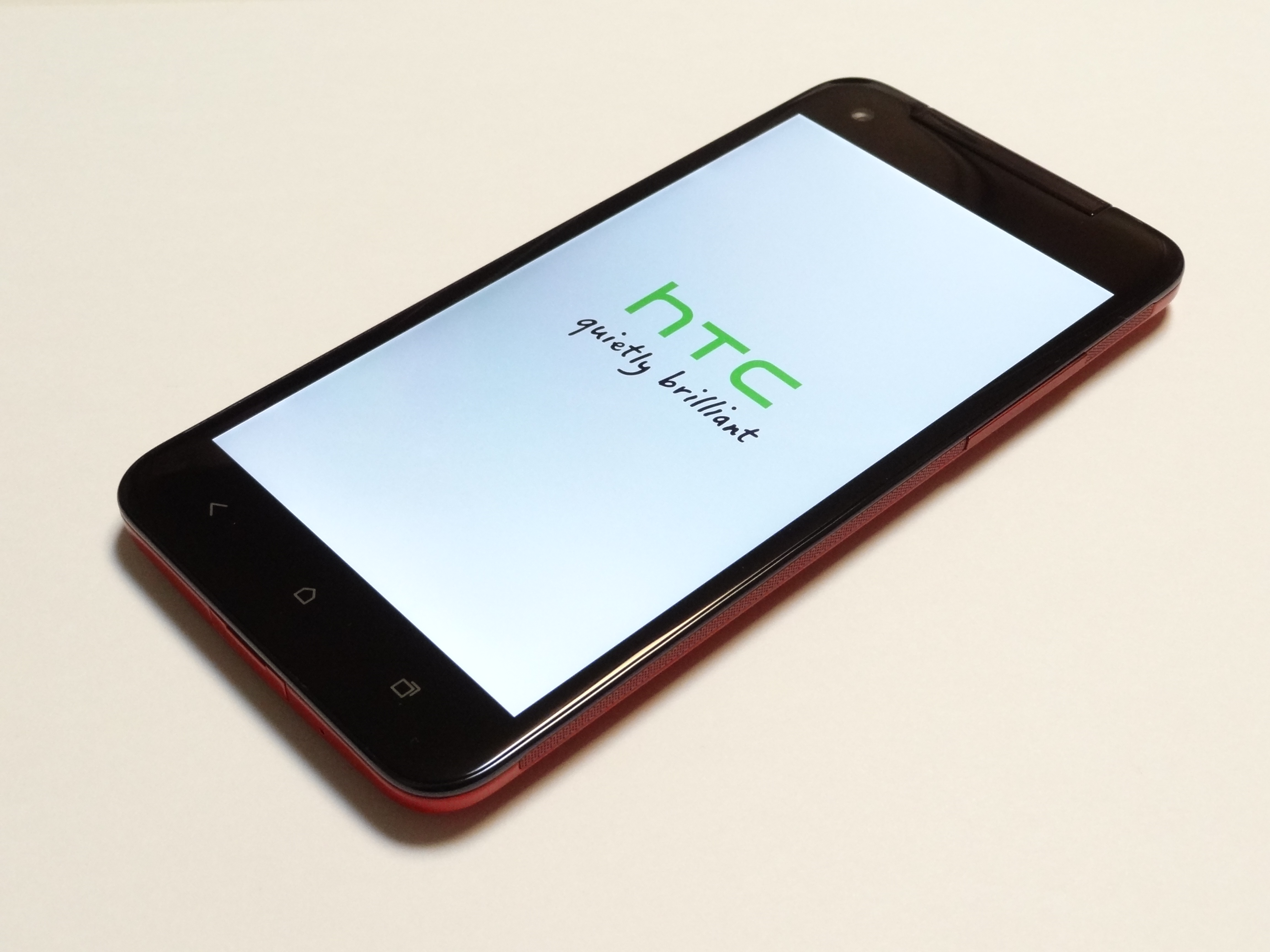
- Manufacturer: HTC
- Discontinued: June 2013
- Compatible networks: Droid DNA: dual-band CDMA2000; EV-DO Rev. A 800 1900 MHz; LTE 700 MHz quad-band GSM, UMTS 850 900 1900 2100 MHz; J Butterfly: quad-band GSM, UMTS 850 900 1900 2100 MHz, LTE
- Form factor: Bar
- Dimensions: 143 mm (5.6 in) H 71 mm (2.8 in)W; 9.1 mm (0.36 in) D
- Weight: 140 g (4.9 oz) (HTC Droid DNA)
- Operating system: Android 4.1 "Jelly Bean"
- System-on-chip: Snapdragon S4 Pro
- CPU: Quad-core 1.5 GHz "Krait" APQ8064 processor
- Memory: 2 GB RAM
- Storage: 16 GB internal
- Removable storage: Expandable up to 32 GB with microSD (J Butterfly only)
- Battery: 2020 mAh
- Rear camera: 8 MP, FullHD 1080p video recording at 30 FPS with re-invented zoom
- Front camera: 2.1 MP, HD 720p video recording at 30 FPS
- Display: 5 inch "Super LCD 3" display 1920×1080 pixels (441 ppi)
- Connectivity: Bluetooth 4.0, WiFi, NFC, DLNA, FeliCa, infrared
- Website: (HTL21) http://www.htc.com/jp/smartphones/htl21 (X920d) http://www.htc.com/www/smartphones/htc-butterfly (DNA) http://www.htc.com/us/smartphones/droid-dna-by-htc (X920e) http://www.htc.com/cn/smartphones/htc-butterfly

The HTC Butterfly is an Android-based, 4G LTE-capable smartphone designed and developed by HTC. First announced for release in Japan by Japanese carrier KDDI as the HTC J Butterfly (HTL21), the J Butterfly was released in Japan on 9 December 2012 as the successor to the HTC J. Outside Japan, in other Asian countries, the phone was released as the HTC Butterfly (X920d) and in China and Russia as the HTC Butterfly (X920e). The Chinese/Russian and US versions of the Butterfly do not have a microSD slot. In the United States, the Butterfly was released as the HTC Droid DNA as a Verizon exclusive, supporting wireless charging. The DNA would become Verizon's final non-Motorola Droid smartphone; following its replacement in August 2013 by the HTC One and Droid Maxx, the carrier announced that all future Droid phones would be built exclusively by Motorola. In June 2013, the Butterfly was succeeded by the HTC Butterfly S.

It is the second smartphone in the world to be announced with a 1080p display, after Oppo's Find 5, and the first phone to be released with one. The phone has Android version 4.1, a quad-core 1.5 GHz Snapdragon S4 Pro processor, an 8-megapixel rear camera, and a 2.1-megapixel front camera. It comes with 2 GB of RAM and a 2020 mAh battery.

The Butterfly is water-resistant with an IP rating of X5 and features a 5-inch "Super LCD 3" display with full HD resolution (1920x1080 pixels). This translates to a pixel density of 440 ppi. In comparison, the HTC One X offers 312 ppi. The Motorola Droid RAZR MAXX HD (HD has 720p display) at 312ppi, the iPhone 5's "Retina display", 326 ppi, and the Nokia Lumia 920, 332 ppi. The display is manufactured by Sharp, JDI.

In India, it was launched at ₹44,900, making it the most expensive Android smartphone at the time. However, after the launch of Vertu Ti for ₹600,000, it lost that title.

In the summer of 2013, the Butterfly was succeeded by the HTC Butterfly S in Asia. The Butterfly S was never released in Japan. The J Butterfly was succeeded by a phone of the same name in the summer of 2014, later released as the Butterfly 2 in other Asian markets.
