= HTC J =

2012 smartphone model

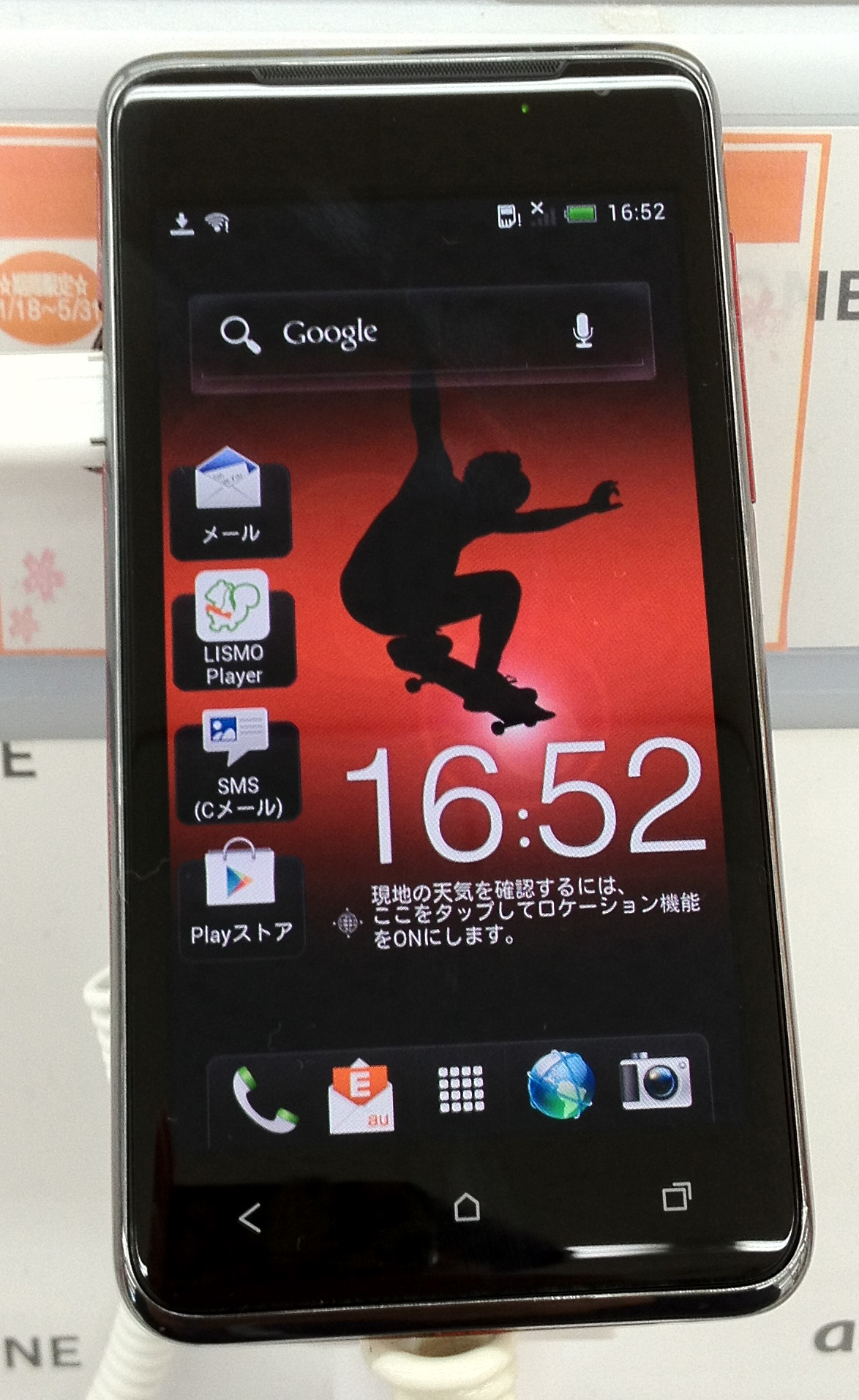
- Manufacturer: HTC
- First released: Japan: May 25, 2012; Taiwan: September 11, 2012; Hong Kong: September 22, 2012
- Predecessor: HTC Sensation XE
- Successor: HTC Butterfly (Taiwan, China); HTC J Butterfly (Japan)
- Compatible networks: GSM / GPRS, EDGE: 850 / 900 / 1800 / 1900 MHz; HSPA, WCDMA: 2100 MHz; CDMA2000: 800 MHz
- Colors: Red; Black; White
- Dimensions: 131.5 mm (5.18 in) H 66 mm (2.6 in) W 9.5 mm (0.37 in) D
- Weight: 137 g (4.8 oz)
- Operating system: Taiwan: Android 4.1.2; Japan: Android 4.0.4
- System-on-chip: Qualcomm Snapdragon S4 MSM8660A
- CPU: 1.5 GHz dual-core
- Memory: 1 GB RAM
- Storage: 16 GB
- Removable storage: microSD (SD 2.0 compatible)
- Battery: 1810 mAh removable lithium-ion battery
- Rear camera: 8 MP, BSI sensor, f/2.0, 28 mm lens, LED flash
- Front camera: 1.3 MP
- Display: 4.3 in (110 mm) qHD AMOLED, 960x540 pixels
- Model: ISW13HT (Japan), Z321e (Taiwan)

The HTC J (Japan model number: ISW13HT, Taiwan model number: Z321e) is a mid-to-high-end smartphone manufactured by Taiwanese manufacturer HTC exclusively commissioned for au, a brand owned by Japanese telecommunications operator KDDI

Announced on April 20, 2012 and released on May 25, 2012, it features hardware specifications similar to the HTC One S, but with a redesigned Japanese-style exterior. Improvements over the One S include a removable battery, microSD card support, and a front-facing camera upgraded from 0.3 MP to 1.3 MP. Promoted with advertisements featuring Nogizaka46, the phone received widespread acclaim upon release, achieving strong sales and boosting HTC's brand awareness in Japan. Due to its popularity in Japan, HTC introduced the device to Taiwan and Hong Kong in September, where it was also well received by younger demographics. Following the success of the HTC J, au collaborated with HTC again in winter 2012 to launch the high-end HTC J Butterfly.

== History ==
The HTC J represents HTC's first customized smartphone tailored specifically to the design preferences and demands of the Japanese market, initially sold exclusively during the summer by Japanese carrier au (KDDI). The "J" in its name signifies HTC's re-entry into the Japanese market.

== Specifications ==
=== Hardware ===
The HTC J features a 4.3-inch qHD Super AMOLED OneCell display with a resolution of 960x540, powered by a 1.5 GHz Qualcomm Snapdragon S4 MSM8660A processor paired with 1 GB of RAM and 16 GB of internal storage, expandable via microSD. Its imaging hardware consists of an 8 MP main camera with an LED flash and a f/2.0 aperture alongside a 1.3 MP front camera. The device incorporates a suite of sensors including a G-sensor, digital compass, proximity sensor, ambient light sensor, and gyroscope.

=== Battery and connectivity ===
It is powered by a removable 1810 mAh battery, measures 9.5 mm in thickness, and weighs 137 g with the battery included. Additional hardware region-specific features for Japan include 1seg digital TV, Osaifu-Keitai e-wallet support, infrared communications, and WiMAX connectivity, alongside Beats Audio enhancement.

=== Software ===
The software experience launched with Android 4.0.4 in Japan and Android 4.1.2 in Taiwan. In Taiwan, the device received its initial software release (version 2.18.709.2) on September 11, 2012, followed by a major system update (version 3.04.709.1) on January 22, 2013, which upgraded the operating system to Android 4.1.1 Jelly Bean with HTC Sense 4+, updated the camera interface and photo processing, integrated photo gallery views by event or location, and added a power-saving mode. A minor stability update (version 3.05.709.1) was released on July 23, 2013, to resolve battery charging issues and introduce a sleep mode switch under power settings, followed by a final maintenance update (version 3.05.709.2) in July 2014.
