= HTC Evo 3D =

Smartphone model

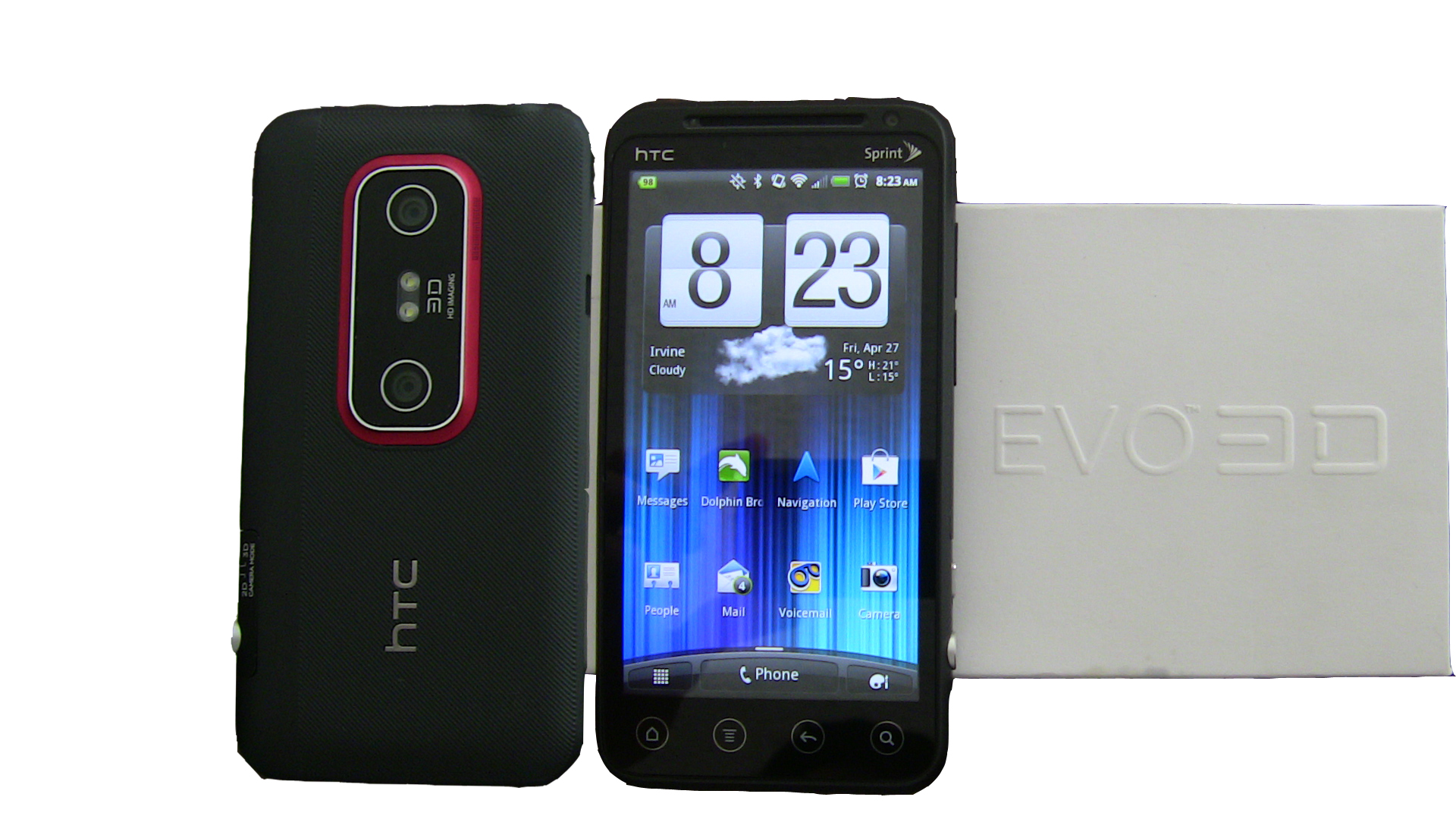
- Manufacturer: HTC Corporation
- Type: Smartphone
- Series: HTC Evo
- Availability by region: June 24, 2011 (U.S.)
- Predecessor: HTC Evo 4G
- Successor: HTC Evo 4G LTE
- Related: HTC Evo Shift 4G; HTC Evo Design 4G
- Compatible networks: Sprint, Virgin Mobile USA Rogers Wireless
- Form factor: Slate
- Color: White or Black
- Dimensions: 127 mm (5.0 in) H 66 mm (2.6 in) W 12 mm (0.47 in) D
- Weight: 170 g (6.0 oz)
- Operating system: Official: Android 2.3.4 "Gingerbread" with HTC Sense 3.0; Current: Android 4.0.3 "Ice Cream Sandwich" with HTC Sense 3.6; Unofficial: Android 4.1.2 "Jelly Bean" via CyanogenMod 10
- CPU: Dual-Core, 1.2 GHz Qualcomm MSM8660 (Snapdragon)
- GPU: Qualcomm Adreno 220
- Memory: 1 GB RAM
- Storage: 4 GB eMMC
- Removable storage: 8 GB microSDHC (32 GB max)
- SIM: Embedded UICC microSIM
- Battery: 1730 mAh Lithium-ion battery
- Rear camera: Backside Illumination Dual 5-megapixel autofocus with dual LED flash, rear-facing
- Front camera: 1.3-megapixel, front-facing
- Display: 960×540 px, 4.3 in (10.9 cm) at 256 ppi qHD capacitive Super-LCD (0.49 megapixels) Autostereoscopic 3D-capable
- Connectivity: Tri-band CDMA/EVDO Rev. A (800/800ESMR/1900 MHz); 2.5 to 2.7 GHz WiMAX 802.16e Wi-Fi (802.11b/g/n); Bluetooth v3.0 + HS; Micro USB; HDMI (via MHL)
- Data inputs: Multi-touch touchscreen display 3-axis accelerometer 3-axis gyroscope Digital compass Proximity sensor Ambient light sensor
- Hearing aid compatibility: M4/T3
- Other: Wi-Fi Hotspot, FM-Radio, GPS navigation

The HTC Evo 3D is a 3D-enabled Android smartphone developed by HTC, released exclusively in the United States through Sprint, and was re-released as a pre-paid smartphone by Virgin Mobile in May 2012 as the HTC Evo V 4G. A variation of Sprint's flagship HTC Evo 4G, the device is distinguished by its pair of 5 MP rear cameras, which made the Evo 3D the first cell phone to do so, which can be used to take photos or video in stereographic 3D, which can be viewed on its autostereoscopic display without the need for 3D glasses. Several GSM variants are also available in Canada, Europe and Asia.

== History ==
Sprint announced the HTC EVO 3D during its CTIA in Orlando, Florida, in March 2011.

In June 2011, Sprint officially announced that the HTC Evo 3D would be available on June 24, 2011.

On May 31, 2012, shortly after the release of its successor, the HTC Evo 4G LTE, Sprint's prepaid service Virgin Mobile re-released the Evo 3D as the Evo V 4G, as its first phone to use Sprint's WiMAX network. The Evo V 4G is identical to the Evo 3D, except that it ships with Android 4.0.3 and the Sense 3.6 interface instead of Sense 3.0 and Android 2.3. The new software also became available for the Evo 3D on Sprint as an update.

== Features ==
=== Processor ===
The Evo 3D utilizes a Snapdragon S3 chipset with a dual-core 1.2 GHz processor and an Adreno 220 GPU.

=== Screen ===
The Evo 3D uses a 960×540-pixel 4.3-inch screen coated with Gorilla Glass, capable of autostereoscopy for the viewing of 3D content without the need for specialized glasses.

=== Cameras ===
The Evo 3D uses two rear-facing cameras which are advertised as 5-megapixel each but in reality are one 5-megapixel and one 1080p (some revisions can use a slightly higher resolution using third-party camera apps). The cameras are capable of capturing videos in 720p resolution in 3D or in 1080p while recording standard 2D. It can also take photos in stereographic 3D at 1080p x2 resolution. It features a single 1.3-megapixel front-facing camera.

=== Software ===
The Evo 3D shipped with Android 2.3 and the HTC Sense 3.0 interface. An update was released to upgrade the phone to Android 4.0.3 with Sense 3.6; this update is pre-loaded on the Evo V 4G.

=== Storage ===
The Evo 3D features 4GB internal storage and a pre-installed 8 GB microSDHC card. Its microSD slot supports cards up to 32 GB. Unofficially, the Evo 3D also supports 64 GB microSDXC cards as long as they are reformatted as FAT32 file system format.

== See also ==
- Android version history
- List of Android devices
- List of 3D-enabled mobile phones
