= WiBro =

Wireless broadband Internet technology

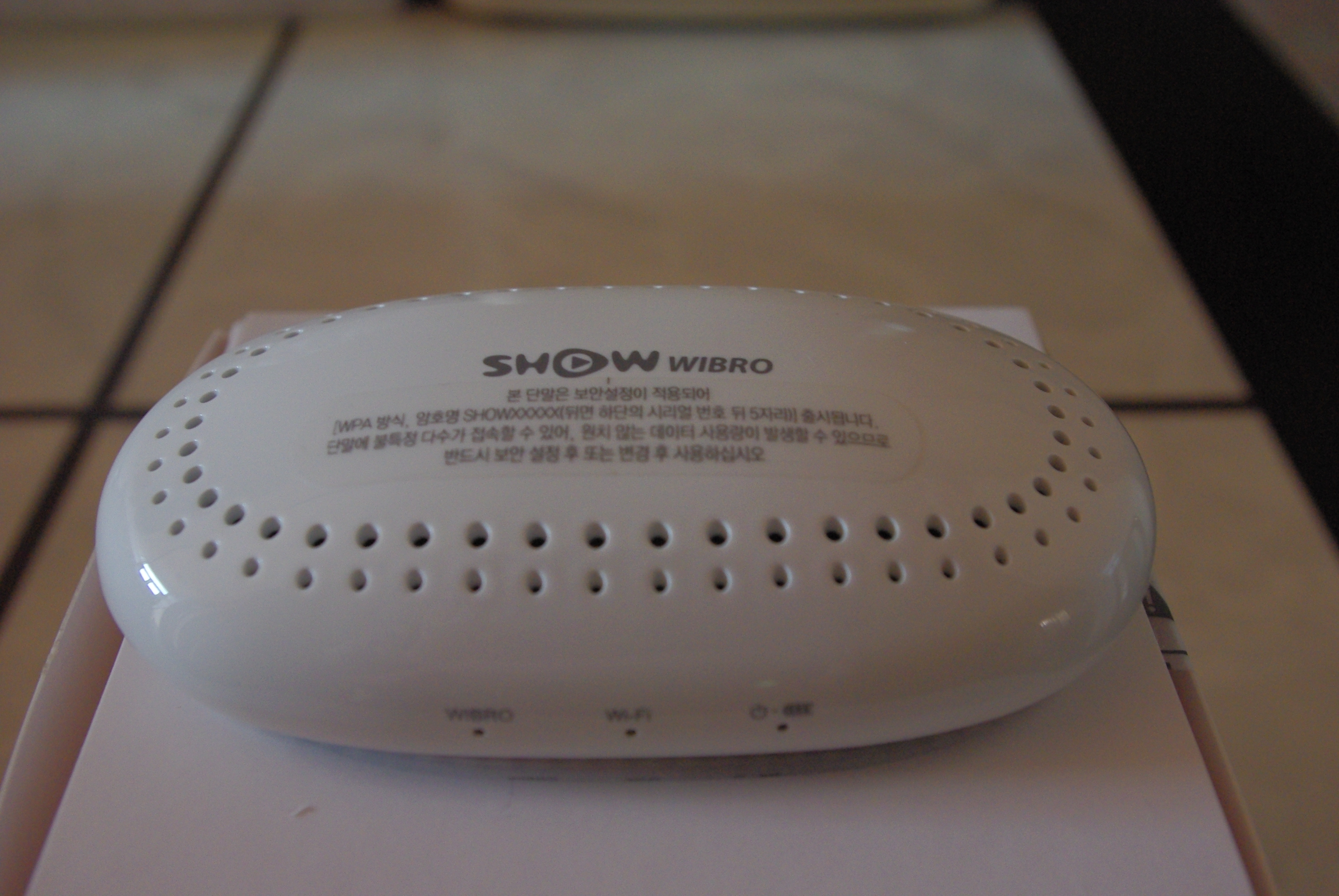
- Wibro Egg sold by KT, produced by Interbro

Korean name
- Hangul: 와이브로
- Revised Romanization: waibeuro
- McCune–Reischauer: waibŭro

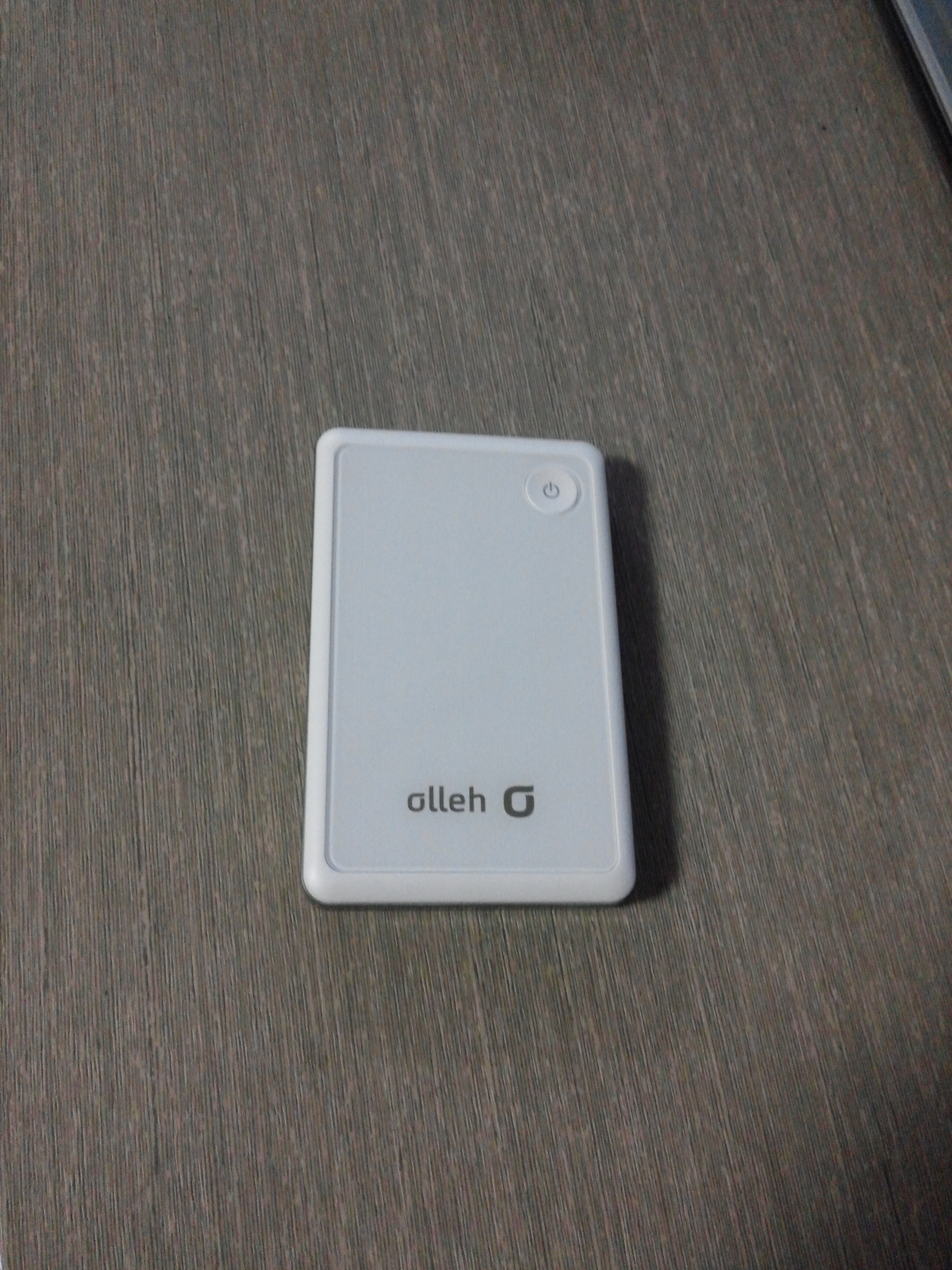
WiBro modem KWD-B2800 (sold by KT, produced by Modacom)

WiBro (wireless broadband) was a wireless broadband Internet technology developed by the South Korean telecoms industry. WiBro is the South Korean service name for IEEE 802.16e (mobile WiMAX) international standard. Usage of the service declined due to competition from LTE and WiBro services were officially discontinued at the end of 2018.

== Deployment ==
In February 2002, the Korean government allocated 100 MHz of electromagnetic spectrum in the 2.3–2.4 GHz band. In late 2004, WiBro Phase 1 was standardized by the TTA of Korea, and in late 2005 ITU standardized WiBro as IEEE 802.16e, also known as Mobile WiMAX. Two South Korean telecom companies (KT, SKT) launched commercial service in June 2006, and the monthly fees were equivalent to around 30 United States dollars (equivalent to $48 in 2025). Though WiBro was most popular and most widely deployed in South Korea, some carriers outside South Korea also deployed WiBro commercially, including Telecom Italia, Televisão Abril (now Vivo TV) in Brazil, Omnivisión in Venezuela, PORTUS in Croatia, and Arialink (now part of the Zayo Group) in the US state of Michigan.

== Technology ==
WiBro base stations offered an aggregate data throughput of 30 to 50 Mbit/s per carrier and cover a radius of 1–5 kilometres (0.62–3.11 mi), allowing for the use of portable internet usage, and providing mobility for moving devices up to 120 kilometres per hour (75 mph) compared to Wi-Fi having mobility up to walking speed and mobile phone technologies having mobility up to 250 kilometres per hour (160 mph). From testing during the APEC Summit in Busan in late 2005, the actual range and bandwidth were quite a bit lower than these numbers. The technology will also offer quality of service. The inclusion of QoS allows for WiBro to stream video content and other loss-sensitive data in a reliable manner. These all appear to be (and may be) the stronger advantages over the fixed WiMAX standard (802.16a). While WiBro is quite precise in its requirements from spectrum use to equipment design, WiMAX leaves much of this up to the equipment provider while providing enough detail to ensure interoperability between designs.

WiBro adopts TDD for duplexing, OFDMA for multiple access and 8.75 MHz (10 MHz in later revisions) as a channel bandwidth. WiBro was devised to overcome the data rate limitation of mobile phones (for example CDMA 1x) and to provide mobile broadband Internet access comparable to ADSL or Wi-Fi.

WiBro broadband connection speeds eventually increased to 10 Mbit/s, around ten times the speed of the initial implementation, which . The WiBro networks were shut down at the end of 2018.

WiBro has a theoretical maximum download speed of 128 Mbit/s and a theoretical maximum upload speed of 56 Mbit/s.

== Service ==
In Korea, before WiBro service was discontinued, KT (Korea Telecom) offered Wave 2 (18.4 Mbit/s, 4 Mbit/s) for 10,000 South Korean won per month with 10 GB data usage to ₩40,000/mo with 50 GB data usage plus free access to their own WiFi hotspots, ollehWiFi. The service coverage was advertised as nationwide, but actual coverage was restricted to urban areas, some railroad stations, airports, and major highways. SK Telecom also offered Wave 2 WiBro Service for US$18.87 a month with 30 GB data usage. Actual service coverage was limited mostly to major cities and highways.

For short term visitors, KT rented WiBro modems and hotspots at the KT Roaming Center in Incheon International Airport. In October 2012, rental of a WiBro-only USB modem cost ₩5,000 per day (equivalent to ₩6,350 in 2025) plus ₩100,000 deposit (equivalent to ₩127,000 in 2025); rental of a WiBro-HSPA USB modem and WiBro mobile hotspot cost ₩8,000 per day (equivalent to ₩10,160 in 2025) plus a ₩150,000 deposit (equivalent to ₩190,500 in 2025). One-day rental was free at KT Roaming Center, but required a credit card and passport.

In India, Tikona Digital Networks (Independent services provider) offered WiBro service up to 2 Mbit/s and 4 Mbit/s in many cities. The 2 Mbit/s unlimited monthly plan cost 999 Indian rupees (roughly US$21).

== Coverage ==
After its official opening in 2006, WiBro expanded to major cities in South Korea. By January 2013, KT covered all 80+ cities while SK covered Seoul and a few other major cities.

== Supported devices ==
Devices that supported WiBro included mobile phones such as the HTC Evo 4G+ and the Samsung Show WiBro Omnia (SCH-M830); mobile hotspots from manufacturers including INFOMARK, Interbro, LG Innotek, and Modacom; USB modems from LG Innotek, Myungmin, and Samsung; and netbooks with integrated WiBro.

== Network deployment ==
In November 2004, Intel and Samsung Electronics executives agreed to ensure compatibility between WiBro and Mobile WiMAX technology. KT Corporation, SK Telecom and Hanaro Telecom (acquired by SK Telecom and renamed SK Broadband) had been selected as Wibro operators in January, 2005. However, Hanaro Telecom cancelled its plan for the WiBro and returned WiBro licence in April 2005. In September 2005, Samsung Electronics signed a deal with Sprint Nextel Corporation to provide equipment for a WiBro trial. Two months later, KT Corporation (aka Korea Telecom) showed off WiBro trial services during the Asia-Pacific Economic Cooperation (APEC) summit in Busan. On February 10, 2006, Telecom Italia, the dominant telephony and internet service provider in Italy, together with Korean Samsung Electronics, has demonstrated to the public a WiBro network service on the occasion of the 2006 Winter Olympics, held in Turin, with downlink speed of 10 Mbit/s and uplink speed of some hundreds of kbit/s even in movement up to 120 km/h. In the same event Samsung tlc div. president Kitae Lee assured a future of 20–30 Mbit/s by the end of this year (2006) and >100 Mbit/s down/>1 Mbit/s up in 2008. KT Corporation launched commercial WiBro service in June 2006. Sprint (US), BT (UK), KDDI (JP), and TVA (BR) have or are trialing WiBro. KT Corporation and SK Telecom launched WiBro around Seoul on June 30, 2006. On April 3, 2007, KT launched WiBro coverage for all areas of Seoul including all subway lines. In January 2011, KT's mobile network SHOW and home network QOOK merged. Since then, KT has been changed to olleh. In March, 2011, olleh's WiBro coverage was expanded nationwide covering 85% of Koreans. In October 2012, olleh's Wibro covered 88% of the South Korean population.

== See also ==
- Digital Multimedia Broadcasting (DMB)
- HIPERMAN
- IEEE 802.16
- WiMAX
