= Vertu Ti =

Smartphone model

- Brand: Vertu
- Type: Smartphone
- First released: 14 February 2013
- Successor: Vertu Constellation V
- Form factor: Bar
- Operating system: Android 4.0 "Ice Cream Sandwich"
- System-on-chip: Qualcomm Snapdragon S4 MSM8260A
- CPU: 1.7 GHz dual-core ARM
- GPU: Adreno 225
- Memory: 1 GB RAM
- Storage: 64 GB flash memory
- Battery: Li-ion 1,250 mAh
- Rear camera: 8 Mpx
- Front camera: 1.3 MpX
- Other: NFC, Concierge
- Website: www.vertu.com/en/collections/vertu-ti.aspx

The Vertu Ti was an Android mobile phone made by Vertu in England. It had a titanium case and a sapphire screen. The phone retailed at £6700 (€7900, $10500).

It shared similar hardware and the same battery pack as Nokia's Lumia 920, and was also manufactured by Nokia, which formerly owned Vertu.

It was made of grade 5 Titanium, polished ceramic and partially covered with leather. The Vertu Ti was announced and released in February 2013. The phone had a 1.7 GHz dual-core CPU and 1 gigabyte of RAM, 64 gigabytes of built-in storage which could be increased by up to 32 gigabytes with a removable MicroSD memory card. The display was a 480 x 800, 3.7 inch TFT capacitive, multitouch, sapphire crystal glass touchscreen.

The phone had an 8-megapixel camera with autofocus, geo-tagging and an LED flash. The front-facing camera had a resolution of 1.3 megapixels.
