= HTC Raider 4G =

Smartphone model

HTC Raider 4G HTC Vivid HTC Velocity
- Brand: HTC
- Manufacturer: HTC Corporation
- Type: Smartphone
- First released: September 21, 2011; 15 years ago, South Korea
- Predecessor: HTC Sensation
- Successor: HTC One X
- Related: HTC Sensation XE; HTC Rezound
- Compatible networks: LTE(AWS/700, 850MHz or 700/1700/2100MHz), HSPA+/UMTS Tri-band (850/1900/2100MHz), GSM/GPRS/EDGE (850/900/1800/1900MHz)
- Form factor: Slate
- Weight: 6.24 oz (177 g)
- Operating system: Android 2.3.4 with HTC Sense 3.0, 2.3.7 with HTC Sense 3.5 (Australia), upgradable to 4.0.3 with HTC Sense 3.6, upgradable to 4.4.4 with CyanogenMod
- CPU: Dual-Core, 1.5 GHz (Korea/Australia) 1.2 GHz (USA/Canada) Qualcomm APQ8060 Snapdragon S3
- GPU: Adreno 220
- Memory: 1 GB RAM
- Storage: 16 GB
- Removable storage: microSD 2.0 (supports up to 32 GB)
- Battery: 1650 mAh Internal Rechargeable Li-ion; User replaceable
- Rear camera: 8-megapixel (3264×2448) with autofocus and dual LED flash, f/2.2, 28mm lens, 1080p HD video capture
- Front camera: 1.3-megapixel
- Display: 4.5 in (110 mm) capacitive touch screen with qHD (540×960)
- Connectivity: 3.5 mm TRRS connector, Bluetooth 3.0 with A2DP, FM stereo receiver (87.5-108 MHz) with RDS, Micro USB 2.0 (5-pin) port with Mobile High-Definition Link (MHL) for USB or HDMI connection, Wi-Fi 802.11b/g/n
- Data inputs: A-GPS, Ambient light sensor, Digital compass, G-sensor, Gyroscope, Multi-touch capacitive touchscreen, Proximity sensor
- Model: PH39100
- Other: USB and Wi-Fi tethering

The HTC Raider 4G (codenamed HTC Holiday, also known as the HTC Vivid and HTC Velocity 4G) is a smartphone which was released on September 21, 2011, in South Korea. The phone is manufactured by HTC Corporation and runs Android 2.3 with included HTC Sense 3.0. It has since been upgradable to Android 4.0.3 with HTC Sense 3.6 in certain markets.

On October 27, 2011, the phone was announced in Canada, with an underclocked 1.2 GHz dual-core processor for Rogers Wireless and Bell Mobility.

The phone was released in the United States as the HTC Vivid on November 6, 2011, by AT&T as their first LTE-enabled device. It also shipped with the 1.2 GHz underclocked processor as the Canadian variants.

As the HTC Velocity 4G, the phone was released in Australia by Telstra on January 24, 2012, as their first LTE-enabled device. It was announced in Hong Kong on February 1, 2012, by Hong Kong CSL as their first LTE-enabled device which only supports the 2600 MHz LTE band. Vodafone Germany announced it on February 8, 2012, as their first LTE-enabled device.

As of February 11, 2013, the HTC Vivid is still available online at AT&T for $.01 with a new or existing contract and a Required data plan.

== See also ==
- List of Android smartphones
