= HTC Evo Shift 4G =

Android smartphone released in 2011

- Manufacturer: HTC
- Series: HTC Evo
- Availability by region: January 9, 2011 (United States)
- Compatible networks: Sprint
- Form factor: Slider
- Dimensions: 117×60×16 mm (4.61×2.36×0.63 in)
- Weight: 167 g (6 oz)
- Operating system: Android 2.2 "Froyo" with HTC Sense at launch; subsequently updated to Android 2.3 "Gingerbread"
- CPU: 800 MHz Qualcomm MSM7630 Snapdragon S2
- GPU: Adreno 205
- Memory: 512 MB RAM
- Storage: 2 GB internal storage
- Removable storage: microSDHC (2 GB card included; up to 32 GB supported)
- Battery: 1,500 mAh removable lithium-ion battery
- Rear camera: 5 MP autofocus with LED flash; 720p video recording
- Front camera: None
- Display: 3.6-inch TFT LCD, 480 × 800 pixels
- Connectivity: WiMAX, CDMA2000/EV-DO Rev. A, Wi-Fi 802.11b/g/n, Bluetooth 2.1, GPS
- Codename: Speedy (also reported as Knight)
- Other: Slide-out QWERTY keyboard, FM radio, Wi-Fi hotspot

The HTC Evo Shift 4G (marketed as the HTC EVO Shift 4G) is an Android smartphone manufactured by HTC and released in the United States by Sprint on January 9, 2011. Part of the HTC Evo series, it was introduced as a smaller, less expensive alternative to the HTC Evo 4G, featuring a 3.6-inch touchscreen and a slide-out physical QWERTY keyboard.

The handset supported Sprint's WiMAX mobile broadband network, marketed as 4G, in addition to the carrier's existing 3G cellular network. It was released with Android 2.2 "Froyo" and HTC's Sense user interface, and subsequently received an update to Android 2.3 "Gingerbread".

== History ==
Sprint announced the Evo Shift 4G on January 4, 2011, during the Consumer Electronics Show in Las Vegas. Before its official announcement, the device had appeared in technology reporting under the names HTC Knight and HTC Speedy.

The handset became available on January 9, 2011, for $149.99 after a $100 mail-in rebate with a two-year Sprint service agreement. This placed it below the original Evo 4G and the Samsung Epic 4G in Sprint's subsidized smartphone pricing at the time.

The Evo Shift 4G was among the handsets affected by Sprint's subsequent retirement of its WiMAX network. The carrier was scheduled to shut down its remaining WiMAX sites on March 31, 2016, as it transitioned to newer mobile broadband technologies. The shutdown ended access to the phone's WiMAX service, although the handset also supported Sprint's separate CDMA-based cellular network.

== Hardware and design ==
The Evo Shift 4G has a 3.6-inch capacitive touchscreen with a resolution of 480 × 800 pixels. Four touch-sensitive navigation buttons are positioned beneath the display. Its landscape-oriented sliding keyboard includes a four-row QWERTY layout and a directional pad, providing an alternative to the touchscreen for text entry and navigation.

The handset measures approximately 117 mm in height, 60 mm in width and 16 mm in thickness, and weighs 167 g. Its casing has a dark-blue finish, with a removable rear cover concealing the battery and memory card compartment. The sliding keyboard contributes to its greater thickness relative to the original Evo 4G.

The device uses an 800 MHz Qualcomm MSM7630 Snapdragon S2 processor with an Adreno 205 graphics processor, 512 MB of RAM and 2 GB of internal storage. Additional storage is provided through a microSDHC card slot, with support for cards of up to 32 GB. A 2 GB memory card was included with the handset.

The rear-facing camera has a 5-megapixel sensor with autofocus and an LED flash, and supports video recording at 720p resolution. Unlike the original Evo 4G, the Evo Shift 4G does not include a front-facing camera or HDMI output. It has a 3.5 mm headphone jack and a micro-USB connector.

The handset supports CDMA2000 1xRTT and EV-DO Rev. A cellular connectivity on the 800 and 1900 MHz bands, along with mobile WiMAX operating in the 2.5–2.7 GHz range. Other wireless capabilities include Wi-Fi 802.11b/g/n, Bluetooth 2.1, GPS and FM radio. Its mobile hotspot feature allows a cellular data connection to be shared with up to eight Wi-Fi devices.

Power is supplied by a removable 1,500 mAh lithium-ion battery. HTC specified up to six hours of talk time, although actual operating time varied with network conditions and usage.

== Software ==
The Evo Shift 4G was initially released with Android 2.2 "Froyo" and HTC's Sense user interface. Sense provided seven customizable home-screen panels, widgets and integrated applications, including Friend Stream, which combined updates from supported social networking services. Its Leap feature displayed thumbnail previews of the home-screen panels for navigation between them.

In June 2011, Sprint announced an update to Android 2.3 "Gingerbread" for the Evo Shift 4G. The update was scheduled to become available for manual installation on June 17, with an over-the-air rollout beginning June 20. It also included the Swype text-entry application, a downloads application and a fix for media-streaming problems affecting some applications.

In February 2012, Sprint announced another software update, version 2.77.651.3. The update included security fixes, improvements intended to extend battery life and changes to HTC's Peep social networking application. Manual installation was made available on February 2, with update notifications scheduled to begin on February 7.

The same software version was subsequently identified in a security advisory published by NCC Group as resolving a permissions vulnerability affecting HTC's iQRD software. The vulnerability could allow applications to access information without the intended permission checks.

== Reception ==
Contemporary reviews generally praised the Evo Shift 4G's performance, relatively compact dimensions and lower price compared with other Sprint WiMAX smartphones, while noting limitations associated with its display, keyboard and available hardware features.

In PCWorld, Ginny Mies described the phone as responsive and praised its construction and performance. She noted that the smaller display and physical keyboard distinguished it from the original Evo 4G, although she found the keyboard keys somewhat stiff. Her review also criticized the inconsistent availability of Sprint's WiMAX service and the absence of a front-facing camera.

Mark Spoonauer of Laptop Mag praised the keyboard's spacing, the HTC Sense interface and the device's network performance during testing. However, he criticized the thickness of the handset, its difficult-to-access power button and the absence of HDMI output and a front-facing camera. In the publication's battery test, which involved continuous web browsing over WiMAX, the phone operated for six hours and 51 minutes before requiring recharging.

Rich Brome of Phone Scoop considered the Evo Shift 4G a smaller and less expensive alternative to the original Evo 4G rather than a direct successor. He praised the display's resolution and found the phone's general performance responsive, but criticized the keyboard's flat keys, the lack of a spring-assisted sliding mechanism and the difficulty of accessing the power button and memory card slot.

== See also ==
- HTC Evo 4G
- Samsung Epic 4G
