= HTC Evo 4G LTE =

Smartphone manufactured by HTC

HTC EVO 4G LTE
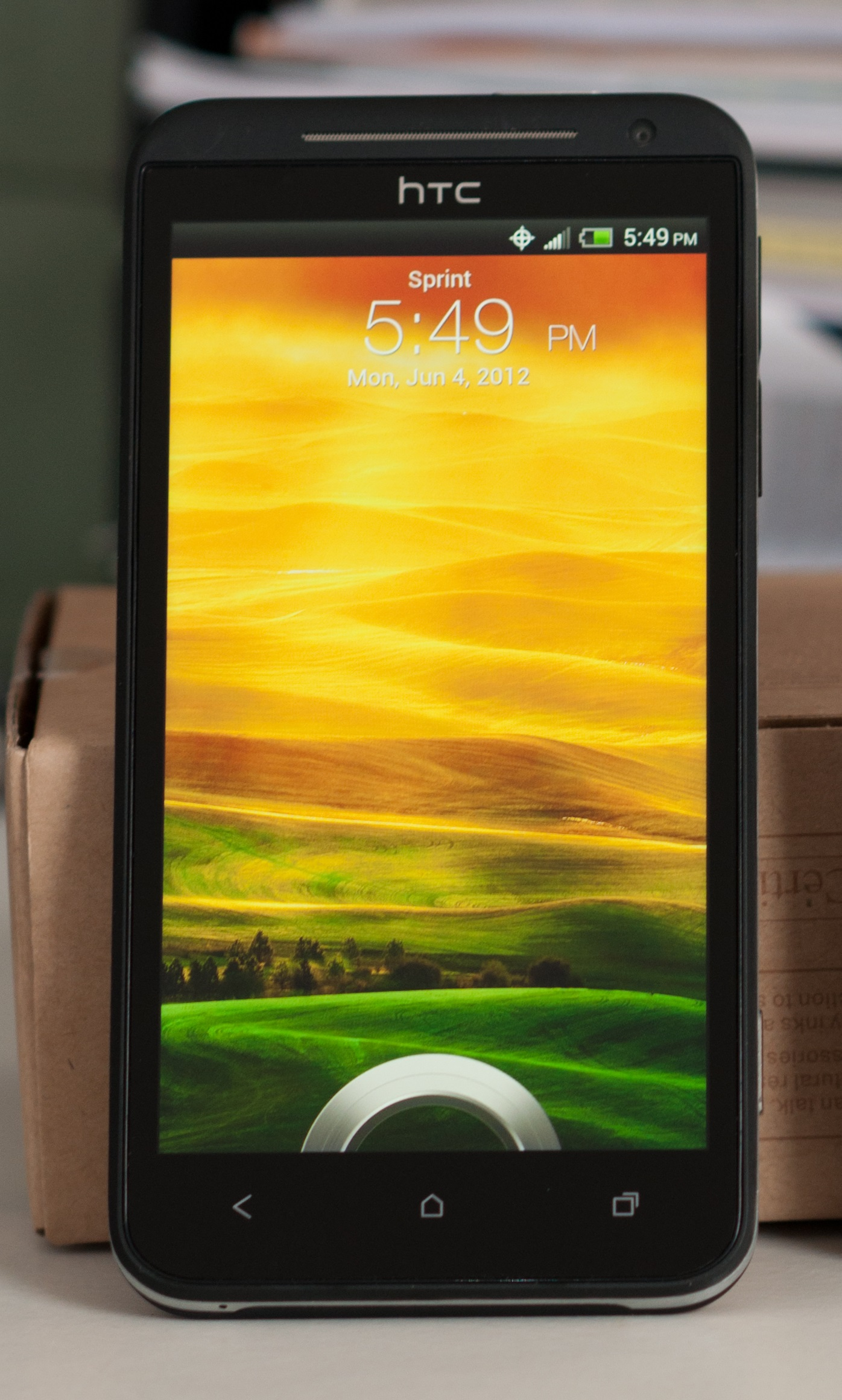
- Manufacturer: HTC Corporation
- Availability by region: Shipped May 24, 2012 (For those who pre-ordered through Sprint online) June 2, for all other consumers.
- Predecessor: HTC Evo 4G; HTC Evo 3D
- Successor: HTC One
- Related: HTC One X
- Compatible networks: Sprint
- Dimensions: 134.8 mm (5.31 in) H 68.9 mm (2.71 in) W 8.9 mm (0.35 in) D
- Weight: 134 g (4.7 oz)
- Operating system: Android 4.0.4 (Upgradeable to Android 4.3 with Sense 5)
- System-on-chip: Qualcomm Snapdragon S4 MSM8960
- CPU: Dual-Core, 1.5 GHz Qualcomm MSM8960 (Krait)
- GPU: Qualcomm Adreno 225
- Memory: 1 GB RAM
- Storage: 16 GB eMMC
- Removable storage: Micro-SDHC
- Battery: 2000 mAh Li-ion (non-removable by user)
- Rear camera: Backside illumination 8-megapixel autofocus with LED flash, rear-facing
- Front camera: 1.3-megapixel
- Display: 1280x720 px, 4.7 in at 312 ppi Capacitive Super-LCD 2
- Connectivity: LTE, CDMA2000, Bluetooth 4.0, Wi-Fi supporting 802.11 a/b/g/n, Wi-Fi Direct. Wi-Fi hotspot, micro-USB with MHL link, NFC
- Data inputs: Multi-touch touchscreen display 3-axis accelerometer 3-axis gyroscope Digital compass Proximity sensor Ambient light sensor
- Codename: Jewel

The HTC Evo 4G LTE is an Android smartphone developed by HTC Corporation to be released exclusively by Sprint. A successor to the previous HTC Evo 4G and 3D models, the Evo 4G LTE supports Sprint's LTE cellular network and its current-generation EV-DO network. The Evo 4G LTE shares features with its GSM counterpart, the HTC One X—such as the same dual-core 1.5 GHz processor used by the One X's LTE variant, a 4.7-inch screen, and Android 4.1 with HTC's Sense 4.0 interface. The Evo 4G LTE was also the first phone built with an all-aluminum frame, leaving only a small plastic piece to allow the SIM and Micro SD cards to be installed.

After a slight delay imposed by a patent infringement lawsuit, the Evo 4G LTE began shipping on May 24, 2012, to customers who pre-ordered the phone on Sprint's website. It was then released on a nationwide basis on June 2, 2012.

== Release ==
The Evo 4G LTE was unveiled in April 2012 as one of the first LTE-enabled smartphones to be released by Sprint, and as a successor to the Evo 4G. The Evo 4G LTE officially became available for pre-order from Sprint on May 7, 2012. On June 2, 2012, the HTC Evo 4G LTE was released.

After an announced May 18 release date for the Evo 4G LTE, shipments of both the Evo 4G LTE and the HTC One X were delayed by U.S. Customs by order of the International Trade Commission, to ensure that its software complied with an import ban imposed on HTC over products violating a "data tapping" patent owned by Apple Inc., relating to displaying a menu of options when clicking on an email or phone number.

On May 21, 2012, the Taipei Times reported that the HTC One X and HTC EVO 4G LTE shipment had cleared US Customs and was entering the United States. Following the report from the Taipei Times, Sprint confirmed the article and announced that the HTC EVO 4G LTE is expected to start shipping Thursday, May 24, 2012, to those who pre-ordered online. To comply with the ruling, such actions are pre-set to particular apps and can only be modified within a new "App Associations" menu.

== Features ==
The Evo 4G LTE is visibly and technologically similar to its GSM counterpart, the HTC One X. As a result, it shares many of its features and functionality with the One X, but still features other slight differences.

=== Kickstand ===
The Sprint CDMA variant of the handset once again featured the kickstand, popular with users of the HTC Evo 4G and watching videos.

=== Screen and input ===
The Evo 4G LTE utilizes a 720p 4.7 inch Super LCD 2 display, with a pixel-density of 312 ppi.

As with the One X, the Evo 4G LTE utilizes three capacitive keys on the front of the phone for the Back, Home, and Recent Apps functions, along with a power button and volume rocker. Unlike the One X, the Evo 4G LTE also features a camera button. As with other Sense 4.0 phones, applications that require the now deprecated "Menu" button from previous versions of Android display this button on a bar at the bottom of the screen when needed.

=== Processor and memory ===
Like the LTE variants of the One X, the Evo 4G LTE utilizes a 1.5 GHz dual-core Qualcomm Snapdragon MSM8960 processor, with 1024 MB of RAM.

=== Cameras ===
The Evo 4G LTE features a rear-facing 8-megapixel camera capable of shooting 1080p videos, as well as a 1.3-megapixel front-facing camera. It also features HTC's "ImageSense" chip, which allows for increased camera functionality, such as the ability to shoot burst shots at 4 pictures per second, as well as take pictures while recording video.

=== Storage ===
The Evo 4G LTE features 16 GB of internal storage. Unlike the One X, the Evo 4G LTE also includes a Micro SDHC card slot, supporting up to 32 GB Class 10 of additional storage.

=== Audio and output ===
As with other contemporary HTC phones, the Evo 4G LTE featured Beats Audio technology, providing better audio quality.

=== Connectivity ===
The Evo 4G LTE features a CDMA cellular radio that supports 3G, EV-DO, as well as Sprint's LTE network. The phone will also be the first Sprint phone to support HD voice. It does not operate on Sprint's 2G iDEN network. More importantly, it does not work on Sprint's 4G WiMAX network. This means that a customer moving from previous generation Sprint 4G WiMAX phones such as the Evo 4G/3D may see drastically slower speeds if they are not in a 4G LTE area.

=== Battery and power ===
The device features an integrated 2000 mAh battery.

=== Software ===
As with other recent HTC phones, the Evo 4G LTE is pre-loaded with Android 4.0 and HTC's Sense 4.0 user interface. A software update for the EVO 4G LTE began rolling out to users on August 29, 2012. The update included several software fixes, Android version 4.0.4, and version 4.1 of HTC Sense. On December 13, 2012, Android 4.1 and Sense 4+ was rolling out with many new features including a new interface and Android version 4.1. On February 3, 2013, a new software update came out fixing the bugs and issues of Android 4.1 and Sense 4+ relating to the proximity sensor and camera. In October 2013, a new software update started rolling out. It made HD Voice over Sprint on by default. While HTC had apparently stated that the EVO 4G LTE would be updated to Android 4.3 via an update from them (rather than Sprint), that update has been pulled and abandoned. While not officially updated past Android 4.1 Jelly Bean, it can still run Android versions up to at least 5.0 Lollipop via community support.

== See also ==
- HTC One X
