= HTC Evo 4G =

Android smartphone released in 2010

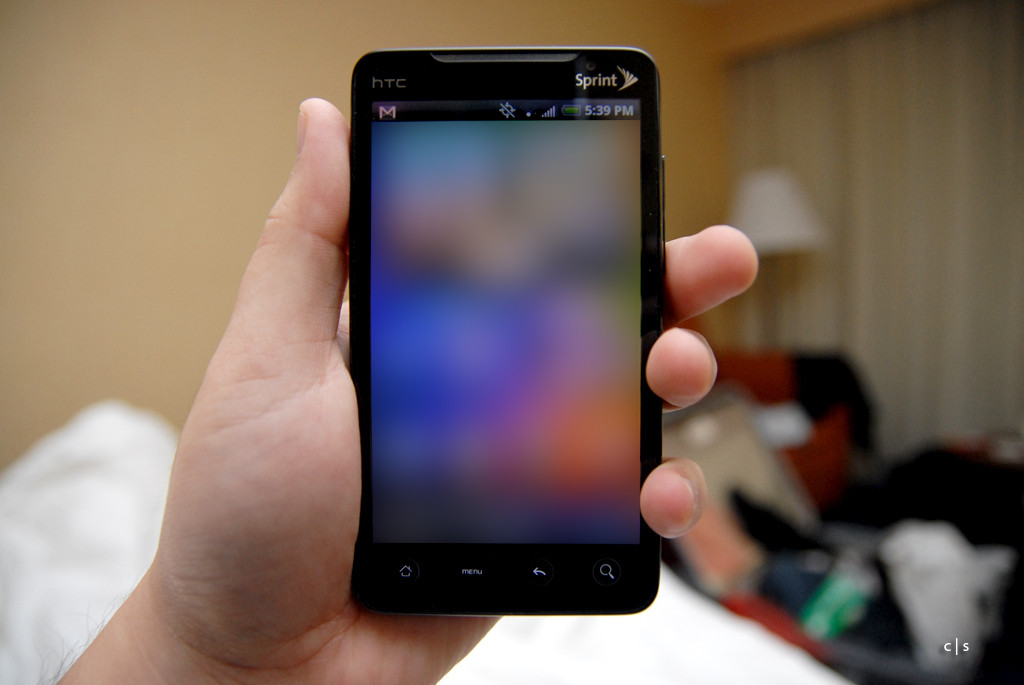
- HTC Evo 4G
- Manufacturer: HTC
- Availability by region: United States: June 4, 2010; Japan (EVO WiMAX ISW11HT): April 15, 2011
- Predecessor: HTC Hero
- Successor: HTC Evo 3D; HTC Evo 4G LTE
- Related: HTC Evo Shift 4G; HTC Evo Design 4G
- Compatible networks: Sprint (United States); KDDI (Japan)
- Form factor: Slate smartphone
- Dimensions: 122×66×12.7 mm (4.80×2.60×0.50 in)
- Weight: 170 g (6 oz)
- Operating system: Android 2.1 "Eclair" with HTC Sense at launch; subsequently updated to Android 2.3 "Gingerbread"
- CPU: 1 GHz Qualcomm QSD8650 Snapdragon
- GPU: Adreno 200
- Memory: 512 MB RAM
- Storage: 1 GB internal storage
- Removable storage: microSD (up to 32 GB supported; 8 GB card included)
- Battery: 1,500 mAh removable lithium-ion battery
- Rear camera: 8 MP autofocus with dual-LED flash; 720p video recording
- Front camera: 1.3 MP
- Display: 4.3-inch TFT LCD, 480 × 800 pixels
- Connectivity: WiMAX, CDMA2000/EV-DO Rev. A, Wi-Fi, Bluetooth 2.1, GPS, micro-USB, micro-HDMI
- Codename: Supersonic
- Other: Integrated kickstand, FM radio, Wi-Fi hotspot

The HTC Evo 4G (marketed as the HTC EVO 4G) is an Android smartphone developed by HTC and released in the United States by Sprint on June 4, 2010. It was the first WiMAX-capable smartphone sold in the United States, supporting Sprint's WiMAX mobile broadband network, marketed as 4G, alongside its existing 3G cellular network.

A Japanese variant, the HTC EVO WiMAX ISW11HT, was released by KDDI through its au mobile service on April 15, 2011.

== History ==
The Evo 4G was announced at the CTIA Wireless trade show in Las Vegas on March 23, 2010. Developed under the codename Supersonic, the handset was presented as Sprint's first smartphone capable of using its WiMAX network. At the time of the announcement, the carrier planned to release the device during the summer of 2010.

The Evo 4G went on sale on June 4, 2010, for $199.99 after a $100 mail-in rebate with a two-year Sprint service agreement. Following its release, Sprint reported that the phone had established a company record for first-day sales of a single handset, surpassing the previous records held by the Palm Pre and Samsung Instinct. The carrier did not disclose the number of devices sold.

Sprint subsequently acknowledged that its original comparison of the Evo 4G's launch-day sales with the combined first three days of sales of the Palm Pre and Samsung Instinct had been overstated. In a statement corrected on June 8, 2010, the carrier reported that Evo 4G sales on its launch day were approximately equal to the combined first three-day sales of those earlier handsets, rather than three times greater as initially claimed. Sprint maintained that the Evo 4G had set a company record for single-day handset sales.

In Japan, KDDI began selling the EVO WiMAX ISW11HT on April 15, 2011. The Japanese model combined WiMAX and CDMA cellular connectivity and was released with Android 2.2.

Sprint subsequently discontinued its WiMAX network as it transitioned to newer mobile broadband technologies. The remaining WiMAX sites were scheduled to cease operation on March 31, 2016, ending the availability of the network service that had been a central feature of the Evo 4G.

== Hardware and design ==
The Evo 4G has a 4.3-inch capacitive touchscreen with a resolution of 480 × 800 pixels and four touch-sensitive navigation buttons beneath the display. The handset measures 122 mm in height, 66 mm in width and 12.7 mm in thickness, and weighs 170 g. Its exterior consists primarily of black plastic, with red detailing beneath the removable rear cover. An integrated metal kickstand allows the phone to be positioned horizontally for video viewing.

The Evo 4G's hardware design was compared with that of the HTC HD2, a Windows Mobile smartphone that also featured a 4.3-inch display. In its initial coverage of the Evo 4G, Engadget described the handset as drawing on the HD2's hardware design while incorporating Android and several changes to its appearance. A subsequent review noted differences in the devices' dimensions and construction, including the Evo 4G's greater thickness. The Evo also incorporated additional features, including a front-facing camera and integrated kickstand.

The device is powered by a 1 GHz Qualcomm Snapdragon QSD8650 processor with an Adreno 200 graphics processor, 512 MB of RAM and 1 GB of internal storage. It also includes a microSD card slot supporting cards of up to 32 GB; an 8 GB card was supplied with the handset.

The Evo 4G has an 8-megapixel rear-facing camera with autofocus and a dual-LED flash, capable of recording video at 720p resolution. A separate 1.3-megapixel front-facing camera supports video calling and photography. Additional hardware includes a 3.5 mm headphone jack, a micro-USB connector and a micro-HDMI (HDMI Type D) output for connecting the handset to an external display.

The handset includes an accelerometer, digital compass, ambient light sensor, proximity sensor and GPS receiver. Its removable 1,500 mAh lithium-ion battery is accessible beneath the rear cover.

For cellular data, the Evo 4G supports CDMA2000 EV-DO Rev. A and mobile WiMAX. Its wireless components include a Broadcom BCM4329 chip providing Wi-Fi, Bluetooth and FM radio functionality, and a Sequans SQN210 WiMAX chip. The phone also includes a mobile hotspot feature allowing its cellular data connection to be shared with up to eight Wi-Fi devices.

== Software ==
The Evo 4G was released with Android 2.1 "Eclair" and HTC's Sense user interface. Sense provided customized home screens, widgets and applications, including Friend Stream, which combined updates from supported social networking services. The interface also included Leap, a feature that displayed thumbnail previews of the phone's seven home-screen panels.

Sprint began rolling out an update to Android 2.2 "Froyo" on August 3, 2010. The update introduced features including support for installing compatible applications on the memory card, improvements to the browser and Bluetooth voice dialing.

In June 2011, Sprint released an update to Android 2.3 "Gingerbread". Manual installation became available on June 3, followed by an over-the-air rollout beginning June 6. Along with the operating system changes, the update was intended to address problems involving synchronization of multiple Gmail accounts and the display of email attachments.

A subsequent maintenance update, version 4.24.651.1, began rolling out on June 20, 2011. It addressed several problems introduced by the Gingerbread update, including incompatibility with the Netflix application, missing voicemail notifications and the disappearance of hearing-aid compatibility menu options.

In January 2012, Sprint distributed software update 4.67.651.3 for the Evo 4G. The update included removal of the Carrier IQ diagnostics software, changes to HTC's Peep application and improvements intended to address battery-life problems. The same software version was subsequently identified by the security research firm NCC Group as resolving a permissions vulnerability affecting HTC's iQRD software.

== Reception ==
Contemporary reviews generally praised the Evo 4G's display, performance and multimedia capabilities, although reviewers raised concerns about battery life and the limited availability of Sprint's WiMAX network. In PC World, Ginny Mies praised the responsiveness of the display and the photographic performance of the rear camera. She also criticized Sprint's requirement that customers pay an additional monthly data charge even when they lived outside the carrier's WiMAX coverage area.

Battery performance received differing assessments. A TechCrunch reviewer reported that the handset frequently required recharging before the end of the day, even with several wireless features disabled. In contrast, Mies reported obtaining a full day of operation with moderate data use, although her initial testing did not include WiMAX connectivity.

=== Display issues ===
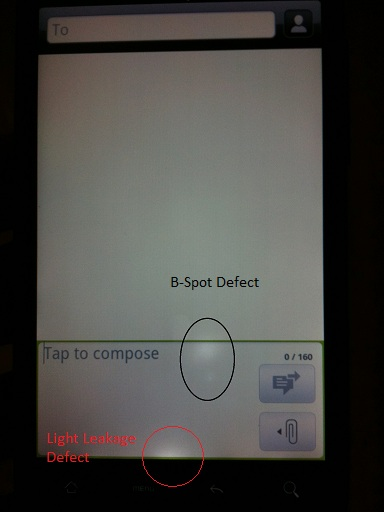
An Evo 4G display photographed in 2011, showing a bright spot and light leakage identified by the uploader.

Reports of display problems emerged shortly after the Evo 4G's release. In its initial review, Engadget observed light leakage along the lower edge of its test handset, where the display met the surrounding casing. In June 2010, the publication reported complaints from owners that the lower portion of the display glass was separating from the handset's body, sometimes accompanied by additional light leakage.

Other reports concerned inconsistent touchscreen sensitivity, particularly when the device was not being held. Engadget reported receiving multiple complaints about this behavior but had not reproduced the problem during its own testing.

VentureBeat subsequently reported that an unidentified source cited by Engadget had described the screen-separation problem as relatively minor and indicated that HTC had made manufacturing changes intended to reduce its occurrence. The same report stated that a software update was being prepared to address the touchscreen-sensitivity complaints.

On June 28, 2010, TechCrunch reported that an over-the-air software update had become available for the Evo 4G and that users were reporting improvements to the touchscreen grounding problem, in which parts of the display could become unresponsive when the handset was placed on a surface rather than held.

=== Frame-rate limitation ===
The Evo 4G was also reported to limit on-screen graphics rendering to 30 frames per second. In July 2010, HTC stated that the limit was associated with the handset's HDMI output hardware and could not be removed through a software update. However, following a firmware update released in September 2010, Engadget confirmed that the limitation had been removed on its test handset.

== See also ==
- HTC Evo Shift 4G
- HTC Evo 3D
- HTC Evo Design 4G
- HTC Evo 4G LTE
