= List of Motorola Mobility products =

Logo of Motorola Mobility

This is a list of Motorola products. Motorola Mobility is an American subsidiary company of Chinese multinational technology company Lenovo that manufactures consumer electronics and telecommunications products.

== Computers ==
=== Laptops ===
- ML910
- MW810
- MW800
- ML900
- ML850
- ML950
- MNope2

=== Handheld ===
- HC700 series
- Symbol Technologies line of products
- HYT
- ICOM
- Motorola
- MotoG

=== Mobile VHF UHF two-way radio ===
- VHF MT 1000
- UHF GP 388 GP 388
- VHF GM 300
- VHF GER 300
- VHF UHF Repeater MSR 2000, GR 500, MTR 2000

=== StarMax ===
- StarMax 3000
- StarMax 4000
- StarMax 5000
- StarMax 5500

== Home and consumer products ==
- Vintage radio and television receivers
- Follow Me TV
- m25 (256 MB) and m500 (5 GB) digital audio players
- iRadio music subscription service

=== Cordless phones ===
- C series: C50, C51, C51, C70
- E series: E30, E31, E32, E33, E34, E40, E51, E51, E52
- G series: G13, G14, G32, G52, G54, G62, G73, G84, G85
- T series: T31
- MA3100 series (2.4 GHz): MA3153, MA3163
- MD4100 series (2.4 GHz digital): MD4153, MD4163
- MD600 series (5.8 GHz digital): MD671, MD681, MA681, MA61
- "Disney phones"

=== Home monitoring and automation ===
- Homesight

==== Cameras ====
- HMVC3050
- HMVC3075
- HMVC3020

== Semiconductors ==
Note: As of mid-2004, these are part of the product portfolio of Freescale Semiconductor, Inc. Please see the List of Freescale products for more information.

== Wireless communications ==
=== Data networks ===
- Canopy – A line-of-sight wireless technology, primarily used by ISPs to provide broadband internet
- MotoMESH – A mobile wireless broadband product providing proprietary "Mesh-Enabled Architecture" and standards-based 802.11 network access in both the unlicensed 2.4 GHz band and the licensed 4.9 GHz public-safety band
- HotZone Duo – Meshed wireless broadband networking product supporting both 2.4 GHz 802.11b/g and 5.8 GHz 802.11a standards. The system supports 802.11e for quality of service management, and is planned to support the 802.11s standard for mesh networking once that standard is finalized
- Orthogon Systems – wireless, non-line-of-sight (NLOS), point-to-point Ethernet bridges
- WiMax Wi4 – GAP, DAP & SAAP Systems. Base Stations based on the recent WiMAX technology. Pointed to Wireless BroadBand Access and Internet.

=== Mobile network carrier infrastructure ===
- ASTRO 25 – implementation of APCO Project 25
- BSC (GSM)
- Dimetra – proprietary implementation of TETRA
- Horizon 2 Macro BTS (GSM)
- Horizon 2 Mini BTS (GSM)
- MSS – Mobile Soft Switch (Multiple Technologies)
- PCU (GSM)
- RXCDR (GSM)

=== Mobile telephones ===
- Status: D = discontinued; P = in production

==== Classic (1983-1998) ====
| Phone model | Screen type | Released | Status | Technology | Form factor |
|---|---|---|---|---|---|
| DynaTAC 8000 Series | LED | 1983 | D | AMPS | Brick |
| DynaTAC International Series | LED | 1992 | D | GSM | Brick |
| DynaTAC 6000XL | Vacuum Fluorescent | 1987 | D | AMPS | Transportable |
| Ultra Classic | LED | 1994 | D | AMPS | Brick |
| Ultra Classic II | LED | 1994 | D | AMPS | Brick |
| 4500X/4800X/5000X (Europe), Tough Talker (North America) | LED, Monochrome | 1984 | D | AMPS | Transportable |
| International 1000/2000/2200/2700 | Monochrome | 1991 | D | GSM | Transportable |
| MicroTAC | LED | 1989 | D | AMPS, ETACS | Clamshell |
| MicroTAC Classic | LED | 1991 | D | AMPS | Clamshell |
| MicroTAC II | LED | 1991 | D | AMPS | Clamshell |
| MicroTAC Alpha | LED | 1992 | D | AMPS | Clamshell |
| MicroTAC Lite | LED | 1994 | D | AMPS | Clamshell |
| MicroTAC Elite | LED | 1994 | D | NAMPS | Clamshell |
| "Bag phone" | Monochrome, Color | 1992 | D | AMPS, TDMA, GSM | Transportable |
| StarTAC | LED, Monochrome | 1996 | D | AMPS, GSM, TDMA, CDMA | Clamshell |
| MR30 | Monochrome | 1998 | D | GSM | Candybar |
| MicroTAC International Series | Monochrome | 1994 | D | GSM | Clamshell |
| MicroTAC DPC Series | Monochrome | 1995 | D | GSM | Clamshell |

==== A series feature phones (1999-2010) ====
| Phone model | Screen type | Released | Status | Technology | Form factor |
|---|---|---|---|---|---|
| A-7F | Color | 2008 | D | GSM | ? |
| A-8B | Color | 2008 | D | GSM | ? |
| A009 (Accompli 009) | Color | 2001 | D | GSM | QWERTY clamshell |
| A455 (Rival) | Color | 2009 | D | CDMA | QWERTY slider |
| A630 | Color | 2004 | D | GSM | QWERTY clamshell |
| A668 | Color | 2005 | D | GSM | Clamshell |
| A830 | Color | 2003 | D | W-CDMA | Candybar |
| A835 | Color | 2003 | D | W-CDMA | Candybar |
| A840 | Color | 2004 | D | GSM, CDMA | Clamshell |
| A845 | Color | 2004 | D | W-CDMA | Candybar |

==== A series smartphones (1999-2010) ====
| Phone model | Screen type | Released | Status | Technology | Form factor | Operating system |
|---|---|---|---|---|---|---|
| A008 (Accompli 008) | Monochrome touchscreen | 2001 | D | GSM | Clamshell PDA | Proprietary OS |
| A388 (Accompli 388) | Monochrome touchscreen | 2002 | D | GSM | Clamshell PDA | Proprietary OS |
| A388C (Accompli 388) | Color touchscreen | 2003 | D | GSM | Clamshell PDA | Proprietary OS |
| A760 – Developed and introduced in China | Color touchscreen | 2003 | D | GSM | Clamshell PDA | Linux + Qt + OpenEZX |
| A768 | Color touchscreen | 2004 | D | GSM | Clamshell PDA | Linux + Qt + OpenEZX |
| A768i | Color touchscreen | 2004 | D | GSM | Clamshell PDA | Linux + Qt + OpenEZX |
| A780 – With quad-band and GPS, available in Europe | Color touchscreen | 2005 | D | GSM | Clamshell PDA | Linux + Qt + OpenEZX |
| A853 (MILESTONE) | Color touchscreen | 2009 | D | GSM, WCDMA | QWERTY slider | Google Android 2.0 (Eclair) |
| A855 (DROID) | Color touchscreen | 2009 | D | GSM, CDMA | QWERTY slider | Google Android 2.0 (Eclair) |
| A953 (MILESTONE 2) | Color touchscreen | 2010 | D | GSM, WCDMA | QWERTY slider | Google Android 2.2 (Froyo) |
| A955 (DROID2) | Color touchscreen | 2010 | D | GSM, CDMA | QWERTY slider | Google Android 2.2 (Froyo) |
| A910/A910i | Color touchscreen | 2005 | D | GSM | Clamshell | Linux + Qt + OpenEZX |
| A920 | Color touchscreen | 2003 | D | W-CDMA | PDA | Symbian 7.0 + UIQ 2.1 |
| A925 | Color touchscreen | 2004 | D | W-CDMA | PDA | Symbian 7.0 + UIQ 2.1 |
| A1000 | Color touchscreen | 2004 | D | W-CDMA | PDA | Symbian 7.0 + UIQ 2.1 |
| A1010 | Color touchscreen | 2005 | D | W-CDMA | PDA | Symbian 7.0 + UIQ 2.1 |
| A1200 (MING) | Color touchscreen | 2005 | D | GSM | Clamshell PDA | Linux + Qt + MOTOMAGX |
| A1600 (MING2) | Color touchscreen | 2008 | D | GSM | Clamshell PDA | Linux + Qt + MOTOMAGX |
| A3100 (SURF) | Color touchscreen | 2009 | D | GSM, W-CDMA | PDA | Microsoft Windows Mobile 6.1 Professional |
| A6288 | Monochrome touchscreen | 2001 | D | GSM | Clamshell PDA | Proprietary OS |

==== C series (1998-2006) ====
| Phone model | Screen type | Released | Status | Technology | Data and connectivity | Form factor |
|---|---|---|---|---|---|---|
| C115 | Monochrome | 2005 | D | GSM | | Candybar |
| C116 | Monochrome | 2005 | D | GSM | | Candybar |
| C117 | Monochrome | 2005 | D | GSM | | Candybar |
| C118 | Monochrome | 2005 | D | GSM | | Candybar |
| C123 | Monochrome | 2005 | D | GSM | | Candybar |
| C131 | Monochrome | 2005 | D | GSM | | Candybar |
| C139 | Color | 2006 | D | GSM | | Candybar |
| C140 | Color | 2006 | D | GSM | | Candybar |
| C155 | Color | 2006 | D | GSM | | Candybar |
| C157 | Color | 2005 | D | | | |
| C168 | Color | 2006 | D | GSM | | Candybar |
| C200 | Monochrome | 2002 | D | GSM | | Candybar |
| C201 | Monochrome | 2001 | D | GSM | | Candybar |
| C202 | Monochrome | 2002 | D | GSM | | Candybar |
| C205 | Monochrome | 2002 | D | GSM | | Candybar |
| C212 | Color | 2005 | D | GSM | | Candybar |
| C250 | Monochrome | 2002 | D | GSM | | Candybar |
| C256 | Monochrome | 2002 | D | GSM | | Candybar |
| C260 | Color | 2005 | D | CDMA | | Candybar |
| C261 | Color | 2005 | D | GSM | | Candybar |
| C290 | Color | 2006 | D | CDMA | | Clamshell |
| C291 | Color | 2005 | D | GSM | | Clamshell |
| C300 | Monochrome | 2002 | D | GSM | | Candybar |
| C331 | Monochrome | 2002 | D | TDMA, GSM | | Candybar |
| C332 | Monochrome | 2003 | D | GSM | | Candybar |
| C333 | Monochrome | 2003 | D | CDMA, TDMA, GSM | | Candybar |
| C341 | Color | 2004 | D | CDMA | | Candybar |
| C343 | Color | 2003 | D | CDMA | | Candybar |
| C343a | Color | 2005 | D | CDMA | | Candybar |
| C350g | Color | 2005 | D | GSM | | Candybar |
| C353 | Color CSTN | 2003 | D | TDMA, GSM | WAP 1.2.1; PC Sync | Candybar |
| C359 | Color | 2005 | D | GSM | | Candybar |
| C370 | Color | 2005 | D | GSM | | Candybar |
| C380 | Color | 2005 | D | GSM | | Candybar |
| C381p | Color | 2005 | D | GSM | | Candybar |
| C385 | Color | 2004 | D | GSM | WAP 2.0; PC Sync | Candybar |
| C390 | Color | 2005 | D | GSM | | Candybar |
| C450 | Color | 2005 | D | GSM | | Candybar |
| C520 | Monochrome | 1998 | D | GSM | | Candybar |
| C550 | Color | 2005 | D | GSM | | Candybar |
| C650 | Color | 2005 | D | GSM | | Candybar |
| C651 | Color | 2005 | D | GSM | | Candybar |
| C975 | Color | 2004 | D | W-CDMA | | Candybar |
| C980 | Color | 2004 | D | W-CDMA | | Candybar |
| C1100 | Color | 2005 | D | GSM | | Candybar |

==== E series (2004-2006) ====
| Phone model | Screen type | Released | Status | Technology | Form factor |
|---|---|---|---|---|---|
| E310 | Color | 2005 | D | CDMA | Clamshell |
| E378i | Color | 2005 | D | GSM | Clamshell |
| E365 | Color | 2003 | D | GSM | Clamshell |
| E380 | Color | 2006 | D | GSM | Clamshell |
| E398 | Color | 2005 | D | GSM | Candybar |
| E550 | Color | 2006 | D | GSM | Clamshell |
| E680 Linux-based | Color | 2006 | D | GSM | Candybar |
| E680i Linux-based | Color | 2006 | D | GSM | Candybar |
| E770 | Color | 2006 | D | GSM, W-CDMA | Clamshell |
| E815/E816 | Color | 2005 | D | CDMA | Clamshell |
| E1000 | Color | 2006 | D | W-CDMA | Candybar |
| E1070 | Color | 2006 | D | W-CDMA | Candybar |

==== Timeport series (1999-2003) ====
| Phone model | Screen type | Released | Status | Technology | Form factor |
|---|---|---|---|---|---|
| L7089 (Timeport) | Monochrome | 1998 | D | GSM | Candybar |
| P7389 | Monochrome | 2000 | D | GSM | Candybar |
| P8767 | Monochrome | 2000 | D | CDMA, AMPS | Clamshell |
| 250 | Monochrome | 2001 | D | GSM | Candybar |
| 280 | Monochrome | 2001 | D | GSM | Candybar |
| 260 | Monochrome | 2002 | D | GSM | Candybar |

==== iDEN/CDMA dual-mode a.k.a. Cobra ====
See also: Integrated Digital Enhanced Network (iDEN), Code division multiple access (CDMA)

| Phone model | Screen type | Released | Status | Providers | Form factor |
|---|---|---|---|---|---|
| ic402 | Color | 2006 | D | Sprint Nextel | Clamshell |
| ic502 | Color | 2006 | D | Sprint Nextel | Clamshell |
| ic602 | Color | 2007 | D | Sprint Nextel | Clamshell |
| ic902 | Color | 2007 | D | Sprint Nextel | Clamshell |

==== Eagle series ====
| Phone model | Screen type | Released | Status | Providers | Form factor |
|---|---|---|---|---|---|
| i500plus | Monochrome | 1996 | D | Nextel | Candybar |
| i550 | Monochrome | 1996 | D | Nextel | Candybar |
| i550plus | Monochrome | 1996 | D | Nextel, NII | Candybar |
| i700 | Monochrome | 1999 | D | Nextel | Candybar |
| i700plus | Monochrome | 1999 | D | Nextel, NII | Candybar |
| i1000 | Monochrome | 1998 | D | Nextel | Clamshell |
| i1000plus | Monochrome | 1999 | D | Nextel, NII | Clamshell |
| i2000 | Monochrome | 1999 | D | Nextel | Candybar |
| i2000plus | Monochrome | 2000 | D | Nextel, NII | Candybar |

==== Condor series (1999-2003) ====
| Phone model | Screen type | Released | Status | Providers | Form factor |
|---|---|---|---|---|---|
| i30sx | Monochrome | 2002 | D | Nextel, SouthernLINC, NII | Candybar |
| i35s | Monochrome | 2002 | D | Nextel, SouthernLINC | Candybar |
| i50sx | Monochrome | 2001 | D | Nextel, Boost Mobile, NII | Candybar |
| i55sr | Monochrome | 2002 | D | Nextel, SouthernLINC, Boost Mobile | Candybar |
| i58sr | Monochrome | 2002 | D | Nextel, SouthernLINC | Candybar |
| i60c | Monochrome | 2002 | D | Nextel, Boost Mobile | Clamshell |
| i80s | Monochrome | 2000 | D | Nextel, SouthernLINC, NII | Candybar |
| i85s | Monochrome | 2001 | D | Nextel, SouthernLINC, NII | Candybar |
| i88s | Monochrome | 2002 | D | Nextel, SouthernLINC | Candybar |
| i90c | Monochrome | 2001 | D | Nextel, SouthernLINC, Boost Mobile, NII | Clamshell |
| i95cl | Color | 2002 | D | Nextel, SouthernLINC, Boost Mobile, NII | Clamshell |
| i99cl | Color | 2002 | D | Nextel | Clamshell |

==== Falcon series (2003-2011) ====
| Phone model | Screen type | Released | Status | Providers | Form factor |
|---|---|---|---|---|---|
| i1 (Android) | Color | 2010 | D | Nextel, Boost Mobile, SouthernLINC, Mike | PDA |
| i9 | Color | 2009 | D | Nextel, Boost Mobile, SouthernLINC | Clamshell |
| i205 | Monochrome | 2003 | D | Nextel, SouthernLINC, Boost Mobile, NII | Candybar |
| i215 | Monochrome | 2003 | D | Boost Mobile | Candybar |
| i265 | Color | 2005 | D | Nextel, SouthernLINC, XPress, NII | Candybar |
| i275 | Color | 2005 | D | Nextel, Bravo Telecom, XPress, NII | Candybar |
| i285 | Color | 2004 | D | Boost Mobile, Mirs, Bravo Telecom, XPress | Candybar |
| i290 | Color | 2007 | D | SouthernLINC, NII, Avantel | Candybar |
| i305 | Monochrome | 2003 | D | Nextel, SouthernLINC, XPress | Candybar |
| i315 | Monochrome | 2004 | D | Nextel, SouthernLINC | Candybar |
| i325 | Color | 2005 | D | Mike | Candybar |
| i325is | Color | 2005 | D | Nextel, SouthernLINC, Bravo Telecom, Avantel | Candybar |
| i335 | Color | 2007 | D | Mike, Nextel, SouthernLINC, NII, Avantel, Bravo Telecom, Boost Mobile | Candybar |
| i355 | Color | 2005 | D | Nextel, SouthernLINC, NII, Mike, Bravo Telecom, Avantel | Candybar |
| i415 | Color | 2005 | D | Boost Mobile, Avantel | Candybar |
| i425 | Color | 2007 | D | Boost Mobile | Candybar |
| i450 | Color | 2005 | D | Boost Mobile | Clamshell |
| i455 | Color | 2006 | D | Boost Mobile | Clamshell |
| i465 | Color | 2009 | D | Boost Mobile, Nextel, SouthernLINC | Candybar |
| i475 | Color | 2011 | D | Boost Mobile, Mike, NII, SouthernLINC | Candybar |
| i530 | Monochrome | 2003 | D | Nextel, SouthernLINC | Clamshell |
| i560 | Color | 2006 | D | Nextel, SouthernLINC, NII, Mike, Bravo Telecom, XPress | Clamshell |
| i570 | Color | 2007 | D | Mike, SouthernLINC, Nextel, NII | Clamshell |
| i580 | Color | 2006 | D | Nextel, SouthernLINC, Mike, Mirs | Clamshell |
| i605 | Color | 2005 | D | Nextel, SouthernLINC, Mike, NII | Candybar |
| i615 | Color | 2005 | D | Nextel, SouthernLINC, NII | Candybar |
| i670 | Color | 2006 | D | Nextel, SouthernLINC, Mirs | Clamshell |
| i680 | Color | 2010 | D | Nextel | Clamshell |
| i686 | Color | 2011 | D | Nextel | Clamshell |
| i690 | Color | 2006 | D | NII, Mike, Mirs | Clamshell |
| i710 | Color | 2005 | D | Nextel, SouthernLINC, XPress | Clamshell |
| i720 | Color | 2005 | D | SouthernLINC | Clamshell |
| i730 | Color | 2003 | D | Nextel, SouthernLINC, Boost Mobile, NII | Clamshell |
| i733 | Color | 2004 | D | Nextel, SouthernLINC | Clamshell |
| i736 | Color | 2004 | D | Nextel (NASCAR Nextel Cup Phones) | Clamshell |
| i740 | Color | 2004 | D | Nextel, SouthernLINC | Clamshell |
| i760 | Color | 2006 | D | Nextel, SouthernLINC, Mirs | Clamshell |
| i776 | Color | 2008 | D | Nextel, Boost Mobile | Clamshell |
| i830 | Color | 2004 | D | Nextel, SouthernLINC, Boost Mobile, NII | Clamshell |
| i833 | Color | 2004 | D | SouthernLINC, NII, Mike, XPress | Clamshell |
| i835 | Color | 2004 | D | Boost Mobile, NII | Clamshell |
| i836 | Color | 2005 | D | Nextel, SouthernLINC, Mirs | Clamshell |
| i850 | Color | 2005 | D | Nextel, SouthernLINC, NII, XPress | Clamshell |
| i855 | Color | 2005 | D | Boost Mobile | Clamshell |
| i857 | Color | 2005 | D | Mike, Mirs | Clamshell |
| i860 | Color | 2004 | D | Nextel, SouthernLINC, Boost Mobile, Bravo Telecom, NII | Clamshell |
| i867 (Android) | Color | 2012 | D | NII, SouthernLINC | PDA |
| i870 | Color | 2005 | D | Nextel, SouthernLINC, Bravo Telecom, NII | Clamshell |
| i875 | Color | 2006 | D | Boost Mobile | Clamshell |
| i876 | Color | 2007 | D | Mike, SouthernLINC, NII, Bravo Telecom, Mirs | Clamshell |
| i877 | Color | 2008 | D | Mike, NII, SouthernLINC, Avantel, Bravo Telecom, Mirs | Clamshell |
| i880 | Color | 2006 | D | Nextel, SouthernLINC, NII, Mike, Mirs | Clamshell |
| i885 | Color | 2006 | D | Boost Mobile, NII, Mike | Clamshell |
| i886 (Android) | Color | 2011 | D | Nextel, NII | Slider, PDA |
| i890 | Color | 2009 | D | Nextel, Southern LINC | Clamshell |
| i920 (Windows Mobile 2003) | Color | 2006 | D | Nextel | Clamshell |
| i930 (Windows Mobile 2003) | Color | 2005 | D | Nextel, NII | Clamshell |

==== M series (2004-2008) ====
| Phone model | Screen type | Released | Status | Technology | Form factor |
|---|---|---|---|---|---|
| M710 | Color | 2007 | D | iDEN | Car Phone |
| M800 | Monochrome | 2006 | D | CDMA | Bag Phone |
| M800 | Monochrome | 2006 | D | CDMA | Car Phone |
| M900 | Monochrome | 2006 | D | GSM | Bag Phone |
| M900 | Monochrome | 2006 | D | GSM | Car Phone |
| M930 | Color | 2007 | D | GSM | Car Phone |
| M990 | Color | 2008 | D | GSM, GPS | Car Phone |

==== M series smartphones ====
| Phone model | Screen type | Released | Status | Technology | Form factor | Operating system |
|---|---|---|---|---|---|---|
| M1000 | Color | 2005 | D | W-CDMA | PDA | Symbian 7.0 + UIQ 2.1 |
| MPx200 | Color | 2003 | D | GSM | Clamshell | Microsoft Smartphone 2002 |
| MPx220 | Color | 2004 | D | GSM | Clamshell | Microsoft Windows Mobile 2003 Second Edition for Smartphone |
| MPx300/MPx | Color touchscreen | 2004 | D | GSM | Clamshell | Microsoft PocketPC 2003 SE |

==== MS series ====
| Phone model | Screen type | Released | Status | Technology | Form factor |
|---|---|---|---|---|---|
| MS100 | Color | 2004 | D | CDMA | Clamshell |
| MS150 | Color | 2004 | D | CDMA | Clamshell |
| MS200 | Color | 2004 | D | CDMA | Clamshell |
| MS250 | Color | 2006 | D | CDMA | Clamshell |
| MS280 | Color | 2004 | D | CDMA | Swivel |
| MS300 | Color | 2006 | D | CDMA | Clamshell |
| MS330 | Color | 2004 | D | CDMA | Clamshell |
| MS350 | Color | 2005 | D | CDMA | Clamshell |
| MS400 | Color | 2005 | D | CDMA | Slider |
| MS500 | Color | 2005 | D | CDMA | Clamshell |
| MS550 | Color | 2006 | D | CDMA | Slider |
| MS600 | Color | 2006 | D | CDMA | Slider |
| MS700 | Color | 2006 | D | CDMA | Clamshell |
| MS800 | Color | 2006 | D | CDMA | Clamshell |
| MS900 | Color | 2007 | D | CDMA | Clamshell |

==== Q series smartphones (2005-2008) ====
| Phone model | Screen type | Released | Status | Technology | Form factor | Operating system |
|---|---|---|---|---|---|---|
| Q | Color | 2005 | D | CDMA | Keyboard bar | Microsoft Windows Mobile 5.0 for Smartphone |
| Q9c | Color | 2007 | D | CDMA | Keyboard bar | Microsoft Windows Mobile 6 Standard |
| Q9h | Color | 2007 | D | HSDPA | Keyboard bar | Microsoft Windows Mobile 6 Standard |
| Q9m | Color | 2007 | D | CDMA | Keyboard bar | Microsoft Windows Mobile 6 Standard |
| Q11 | Color | 2008 | D | GSM | Keyboard bar | Microsoft Windows Mobile 6.1 Standard |

==== T series (1999-2006) ====
| Phone model | Screen type | Released | Status | Technology | Form factor |
|---|---|---|---|---|---|
| T190 | Monochrome | 2003 | D | GSM | Candybar |
| T191 | Monochrome | 2003 | D | GSM | Candybar |
| T2260 | Monochrome | 1999 | D | CDMA | Candybar |
| T2288 | Monochrome | 1999 | D | GSM | Candybar |
| T280i | Monochrome | 2003 | D | GSM | Candybar |
| T300p | Monochrome | 2003 | D | GSM, CDMA | Candybar |
| T720 | Color | 2002 | D | GSM, CDMA | Clamshell |
| T721 | Color | 2004 | D | GSM | Clamshell |
| T722 | Color | 2004 | D | GSM | Clamshell |
| T725 | Color | 2004 | D | GSM | Clamshell |
| T730 | Color | 2005 | D | CDMA | Clamshell |
| T731 | Color | 2004 | D | CDMA | Clamshell |

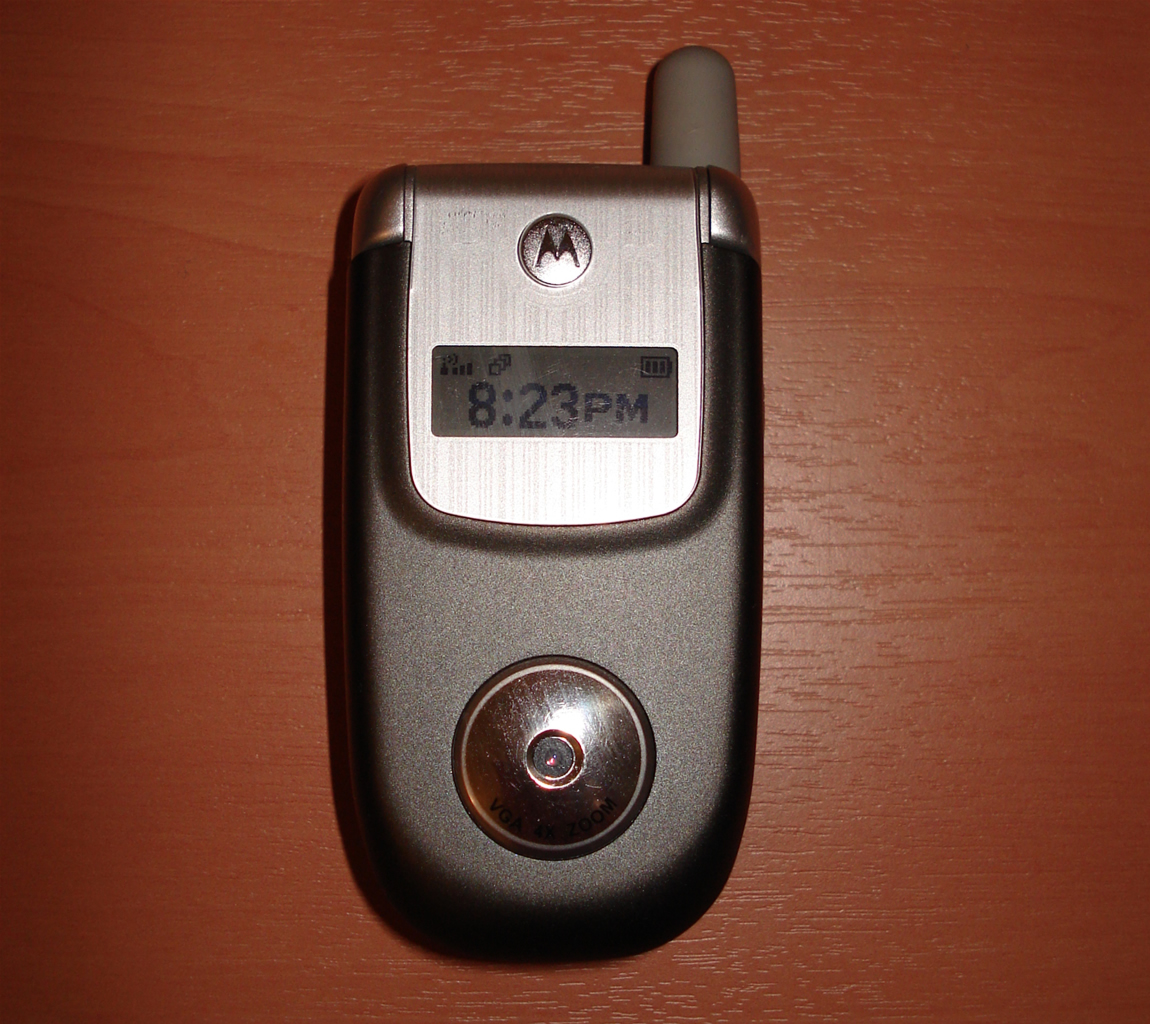
Motorola V220 budget friendly flip phone released in 2004

==== V series (1998-2008) ====
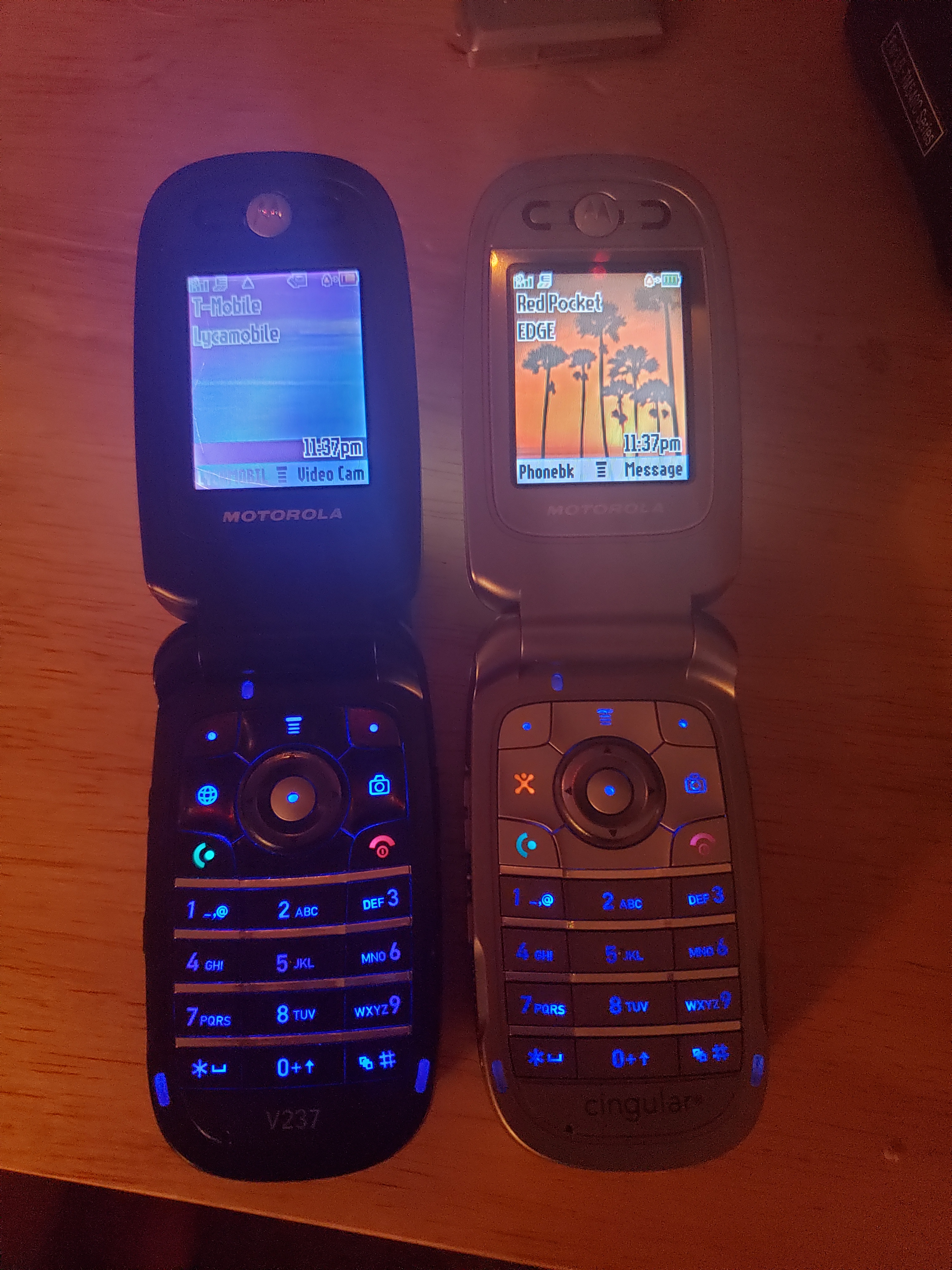
Motorola V235 and V237 budget level phones from 2005, sold by Cingular

| Phone model | Screen type | Released | Status | Technology | Form factor |
|---|---|---|---|---|---|
| V3688 | Monochrome | 1998 | D | GSM | Clamshell |
| V3690 | Monochrome | 1999 | D | GSM | Clamshell |
| V50 | Monochrome | 1999 | D | GSM | Clamshell |
| V8088 | Monochrome | 2000 | D | GSM | Clamshell |
| V3620 | LED | 1998 | D | AMPS | Clamshell |
| V60 | Monochrome | 1999 | D | CDMA, TDMA, GSM | Clamshell |
| V60p | Monochrome | 2003 | D | CDMA | Clamshell |
| V60v | Color | 2003 | D | CDMA | Clamshell |
| V60t Color | Color | 2003 | D | TDMA | Clamshell |
| V65p | Color | 2003 | D | CDMA | Clamshell |
| V66 | Monochrome | 2003 | D | GSM | Clamshell |
| V66i | Monochrome | 2003 | D | GSM | Clamshell |
| V70 | Monochrome | 2003 | D | GSM | Swivel |
| V80 | Color | 2003 | D | GSM | Swivel |
| V100 | Monochrome | 1999 | D | GSM | Clamshell |
| V120c | Monochrome | 2002 | D | CDMA | Candybar |
| V120e | Monochrome | 2002 | D | CDMA | Candybar |
| V120t | Monochrome | 2002 | D | TDMA | Candybar |
| V120x | Monochrome | 2002 | D | CDMA | Candybar |
| V150 | Color | 2004 | D | GSM | Clamshell |
| V170 | Color | 2005 | D | GSM | Clamshell |
| V171 | Color | 2005 | D | GSM | Clamshell |
| V173 | Color | 2005 | D | GSM | Clamshell |
| V176 | Color | 2006 | D | GSM | Clamshell |
| V180 | Color | 2004 | D | GSM | Clamshell |
| V188 | Color | 2004 | D | GSM | Clamshell |
| V190 | Color | 2004 | D | GSM | Clamshell |
| V195 | Color | 2005 | D | GSM | Clamshell |
| V195s | Color | 2006 | D | GSM | Clamshell |
| V197 | Color | 2005 | D | GSM | Clamshell |
| V200 | Color | 2005 | D | GSM | Clamshell |
| V220 | Color | 2004 | D | GSM | Clamshell |
| V235 | Color | 2005 | D | GSM | Clamshell |
| V260 | Color | 2004 | D | CDMA | Clamshell |
| V262 | Color | 2005 | D | CDMA | Clamshell |
| V265 | Color | 2005 | D | CDMA | Clamshell |
| V266 | Color | 2005 | D | GSM | Clamshell |
| V276 | Color | 2006 | D | CDMA | Clamshell |
| V300 | Color | 2003 | D | GSM | Clamshell |
| V303 | Color | 2005 | D | GSM | Clamshell |
| V323 | Color | 2005 | D | CDMA | Clamshell |
| V325 | Color | 2005 | D | CDMA | Clamshell |
| V330 | Color | 2005 | D | GSM | Clamshell |
| V360 | Color | 2005 | D | GSM | Clamshell |
| V360v (Vodafone) | Color | 2005 | D | GSM | Clamshell |
| V361 | Color | 2005 | D | GSM | Clamshell |
| V365 | Color | 2006 | D | GSM | Clamshell |
| V400 | Color | 2005 | D | GSM | Clamshell |
| V400p | Color | 2005 | D | GSM | Clamshell |
| V500 | Color | 2005 | D | GSM | Clamshell |
| V535 | Color | 2005 | D | GSM | Clamshell |
| V545 | Color | 2005 | D | GSM | Clamshell |
| V547 | Color | 2005 | D | GSM | Clamshell |
| V551 | Color | 2005 | D | GSM | Clamshell |
| V555 | Color | 2005 | D | GSM | Clamshell |
| V557 | Color | 2005 | D | GSM | Clamshell |
| V600 | Color | 2005 | D | GSM | Clamshell |
| V620 | Color | 2005 | D | GSM | Clamshell |
| V628 (StarTAC 2004) | Color | 2004 | D | CDMA | Clamshell |
| V635 | Color | 2005 | D | GSM | Clamshell |
| V690 | Color | 2005 | D | GSM | Clamshell |
| V710 | Color | 2005 | D | CDMA | Clamshell |
| V740 | Color | 2005 | D | CDMA | Clamshell |
| V750 | Color | 2008 | D | CDMA | Clamshell |
| V810 | Color | 2005 | D | CDMA | Clamshell |
| V872 | Color | 2005 | D | GSM | Clamshell |
| V878 | Color | 2005 | D | GSM | Clamshell |
| V950 | Color | 2008 | D | CDMA | Clamshell |
| V975 | Color | 2004 | D | W-CDMA | Clamshell |
| V980 | Color | 2004 | D | W-CDMA | Clamshell |
| V1050 | Color | 2005 | D | W-CDMA | Clamshell |
| V2260 | Monochrome | 2002 | D | CDMA | Candybar |
| V2288 | Monochrome | 2000 | D | GSM | Candybar |

==== W series (2006-2010) ====
Motorola W375

| Phone model | Screen type | Released | Status | Technology | Form factor |
|---|---|---|---|---|---|
| W156 | Color | | D | GSM | Candybar |
| W175 | Color | 2008 | D | GSM | Candybar |
| W177 | Color | 2008 | D | GSM | Candybar |
| W208 | Color | 2006 | D | GSM | Clamshell |
| W220 | Color | 2006 | D | GSM | Clamshell |
| W230 | Color | 2008 | D | GSM | Candybar |
| W233 Renew | Color | 2009 | D | GSM | Candybar |
| W260 | Color | 2008 | D | GSM | Clamshell |
| W270 | Color | 2008 | D | GSM | Clamshell |
| W315 | Color | 2006 | D | CDMA | Clamshell |
| W370 | Color | 2006 | D | GSM | Clamshell |
| W375 | Color | 2006 | D | GSM | Clamshell |
| W376 | Color | 2008 | D | GSM | Clamshell |
| W376g | Color | 2008 | D | GSM | Clamshell |
| W385 | Color | 2007 | D | CDMA | Clamshell |
| W388 Renew+ | Color | 2009 | D | GSM | Candybar |
| W396 | Color | 2007 | D | GSM | Clamshell |
| W490 | Color | 2007 | D | GSM | Clamshell |
| W510 | Color | 2006 | D | GSM | Clamshell |
| W755 | Color | 2008 | D | CDMA | Clamshell |
| W760 | Color | 2008 | D | W-CDMA | Clamshell |

==== WX series (2009-2013) ====
| Phone model | Screen type | Released | Status | Technology | Form factor |
|---|---|---|---|---|---|
| WX160 | Color | 2009 | D | GSM | Candybar |
| WX181 | Color | 2010 | D | GSM | Candybar |
| WX290 | Color | 2010 | D | GSM | Candybar |
| WX295 | Color | 2010 | D | GSM | Clamshell |
| WX306 | Color | 2011 | D | GSM | Candybar |
| WX308 | Color | 2012 | D | GSM | Candybar |
| WX345 | Color | 2011 | D | GSM | Clamshell |
| WX346 | Color | 2011 | D | GSM | Clamshell |
| WX390 | Color | 2009 | D | GSM | Candybar |
| WX395 | Color | 2009 | D | GSM | Candybar |
| WX416 | Color | 2010 | D | GSM | Clamshell |

==== Four Letter (4LTR) series (2004-) ====
| Phone model | Screen type | Released | Status | Technology | Form factor |
|---|---|---|---|---|---|
| AURA | Color (circular) | 2008 | D | GSM | Swivel |
| FONE F3 | Electronic Paper | 2006 | D | GSM, CDMA | Candybar |
| KRZR K1 | Color | 2006 | D | GSM, CDMA | Clamshell |
| KRZR K3 | Color | 2007 | D | W-CDMA, CDMA | Clamshell |
| KRZR K3m | Color | 2007 | D | W-CDMA, CDMA | Clamshell |
| HINT (QA30) | Color | 2008 | D | CDMA | Slider |
| PEBL U6 | Color | 2005 | D | GSM | Clamshell |
| RAZR V3 | Color | 2004 | D | GSM | Clamshell |
| RAZR V3a | Color | 2006 | D | CDMA | Clamshell |
| RAZR V3c | Color | 2004 | D | CDMA | Clamshell |
| RAZR V3i | Color | 2005 | D | GSM | Clamshell |
| RAZR V3m | Color | 2005 | D | CDMA | Clamshell |
| RAZR V3r | Color | 2005 | D | GSM | Clamshell |
| RAZR V3t | Color | 2005 | D | GSM | Clamshell |
| RAZR V3x | Color | 2005 | D | W-CDMA | Clamshell |
| RAZR V3xx | Color | 2006 | D | W-CDMA | Clamshell |
| RAZR maxx (V6 and Ve) | Color | 2007 | D | GSM, CDMA, W-CDMA | Clamshell |
| RAZR² (V8, V9, V9M and VE20) (Linux based - LiMo R1) | Color touchscreen | 2007 | D | GSM, CDMA, W-CDMA | Clamshell |
| RAZR 2020 | Color | 2019 | D | 4G LTE | Clamshell |
| Motorola Razr 5G | Color | 2020 | D | 4G LTE | Clamshell |
| RAZR 2022 | Color | 2022 | D | 4G LTE | Clamshell |
| RAZR 40 | Color | 2023 | D | 4G LTE | Clamshell |
| RAZR 40 Ultra | Color | 2023 | P | 4G LTE | Clamshell |
| RAZR 2024 | Color | 2024 | D | 4G LTE | Clamshell |
| RAZR 50 Ultra | Color | 2024 | P | 4G LTE | Clamshell |
| RAZR 2025 | Color | 2025 | P | 4G LTE | Clamshell |
| RAZR 60 Plus | Color | 2025 | P | 4G LTE | Clamshell |
| RAZR 60 Ultra | Color | 2025 | P | 4G LTE | Clamshell |
| RIZR Z3 | Color | 2006 | D | GSM | Slider |
| ROKR Z6 (Linux based - LiMo R1) | Color touchscreen | 2007 | D | GSM | Slider |
| RIZR Z8 | Color | 2007 | D | GSM, W-CDMA | Slider |
| RIZR Z9 | Color | 2008 | D | W-CDMA | Slider |
| RIZR Z10 | Color | 2008 | D | GSM, W-CDMA | Slider |
| ROKR E1 (First to support Apple's iTunes) | Color | 2005 | D | GSM | Candybar |
| ROKR E2 (Linux based - Qt + OpenEZX) | Color touchscreen | 2006 | D | GSM | Candybar |
| ROKR E6 (Linux based - Qt + OpenEZX) | Color touchscreen | 2006 | D | GSM, W-CDMA | PDA |
| ROKR E8 (Linux based - LiMo R1) | Color touchscreen | 2008 | D | GSM | Candybar |
| PEBL U3 | Color | 2007 | D | GSM | Clamshell |
| ROKR U9 (Linux based - LiMo R1) | Color touchscreen | 2007 | D | GSM | Clamshell |
| ROKR W5 | Color | 2007 | D | GSM | Clamshell |
| SLVR L2 | Color | 2006 | D | GSM, CDMA | Candybar |
| SLVR L6 | Color | 2006 | D | GSM, CDMA | Candybar |
| SLVR L6i | Color | 2006 | D | GSM, CDMA | Candybar |
| SLVR L7 | Color | 2006 | D | GSM, CDMA | Candybar |
| SLVR L7e (called L71 in Asia) | Color | 2006 | D | GSM, CDMA | Candybar |
| SLVR L9 (called L72 in Asia) | Color | 2007 | D | GSM, CDMA | Candybar |
| ZINE ZN5 (Linux based - Qt + OpenEZX) (First to support Kodak's Imaging technology) | Color touchscreen | 2008 | D | GSM | Candybar |

==== Android Smartphones (2009–) ====
| Phone model | Released | Status | Android version | References |
|---|---|---|---|---|
| Motorola Cliq | 2009/10 | D | Android 1.5 "Cupcake" | |
| Motorola Droid | 2009/11 | D | Android 2.0 "Eclair" | |
| Motorola Backflip | 2010/03 | D | Android 1.5 "Cupcake" | |
| Motorola Flipout | 2010/06 | D | Android 2.0 "Eclair" | |
| Motorola Droid X | 2010/07 | D | Android 2.0 "Eclair" | |
| Motorola Milestone XT720 | 2010/07 | D | Android 2.1 "Eclair" | |
| Motorola Charm | 2010/08 | D | Android 2.0 "Eclair" | |
| Motorola Droid 2 | 2010/08 | D | Android 2.2 "Froyo" | |
| Motorola Defy | 2010/10 | D | Android 2.0 "Eclair" | |
| Motorola Bravo | 2010/11 | D | Android 2.1 "Eclair" | |
| Motorola Droid Pro | 2010/11 | D | Android 2.2 "Froyo" | |
| Motorola Flipside | 2010/11 | D | Android 2.2 "Froyo" | |
| Motorola Atrix 4G | 2011/02 | D | Android 2.3 "Gingerbread" | |
| Motorola Droid 3 | 2011/07 | D | Android 2.3 "Gingerbread" | |
| Motorola Droid Bionic | 2011/09 | D | Android 2.3 "Gingerbread" | |
| Motorola Atrix 2 | 2011/10 | D | Android 2.3 "Gingerbread" | |
| Motorola Droid Razr | 2011/11 | D | Android 2.3 "Gingerbread" | |
| Motorola Droid 4 | 2012/02 | D | Android 2.3 "Gingerbread" | |
| Motorola Atrix HD | 2012/07 | D | Android 4.0 "Ice Cream Sandwich" | |
| Motorola Photon Q | 2012/08 | D | Android 4.0 "Ice Cream Sandwich" | |
| Motorola Droid Razr M | 2012/09 | D | Android 4.0 "Ice Cream Sandwich" | |
| Motorola Droid Razr HD | 2012/10 | D | Android 4.0 "Ice Cream Sandwich" | |
| Motorola Droid Maxx | 2013/08 | D | Android 4.1 "Jelly Bean" | |
| Motorola Droid Mini | 2013/08 | D | Android 4.1 "Jelly Bean" | |
| Moto X (1st generation) | 2013/08 | D | Android 4.1 "Jelly Bean" | |
| Moto G (1st generation) | 2013/11 | D | Android 4.1 "Jelly Bean" | |
| Moto E (1st generation) | 2014/05 | D | Android 4.4 "KitKat" | |
| Moto G (2nd generation) | 2014/09 | D | Android 4.4 "KitKat" | |
| Moto X (2nd generation) | 2014/09 | D | Android 4.4 "KitKat" | |
| Motorola Droid Turbo | 2014/10 | D | Android 4.4 "KitKat" | |
| Moto E (2nd generation) | 2015/02 | D | Android 5.0 "Lollipop" | |
| Moto G (3rd generation) | 2015/07 | D | Android 5.0 "Lollipop" | |
| Moto X Play | 2015/07 | D | Android 5.0 "Lollipop" | |
| Moto X Style | 2015/09 | D | Android 5.0 "Lollipop" | |
| Moto G4 | 2016/05 | D | Android 6.0 "Marshmallow" | |
| Moto E3 | 2016/07 | D | Android 6.0 "Marshmallow" | |
| Moto Z | 2016/09 | D | Android 6.0 "Marshmallow" | |
| Moto Z Play | 2016/09 | D | Android 6.0 "Marshmallow" | |
| Moto M | 2016/11 | D | Android 6.0 "Marshmallow" | [10] |
| Moto G5 | 2017/03 | D | Android 7.0 "Nougat" | |
| Moto C | 2017/05 | D | Android 7.0 "Nougat" | |
| Moto E4 | 2017/06 | D | Android 7.0 "Nougat" | |
| Moto Z2 Play | 2017/06 | D | Android 7.0 "Nougat" | |
| Moto Z2 Force | 2017/08 | D | Android 7.0 "Nougat" | |
| Moto X4 | 2017/09 | D | Android 7.0 "Nougat" | |
| Moto E5 | 2018/05 | D | Android 8.0 "Oreo" | |
| Moto G6 | 2018/05 | D | Android 8.0 "Oreo" | |
| Moto Z3 Play | 2018/06 | D | Android 8.0 "Oreo" | |
| Moto Z3 | 2018/08 | D | Android 8.0 "Oreo" | |
| Motorola One/One Power | 2018/10 | D | Android 8.0 "Oreo" | |
| Moto G7 | 2019/03 | D | Android 9.0 "Pie" | |
| Motorola One Vision | 2019/06 | D | Android 9.0 "Pie" | |
| Moto Z4 | 2019/06 | D | Android 9.0 "Pie" | |
| Motorola One Zoom | 2019/09 | D | Android 9.0 "Pie" | |
| Moto G8 Plus | 2019/10 | D | Android 9.0 "Pie" | |
| Motorola One Macro | 2019/10 | D | Android 9.0 "Pie" | |
| Motorola One Action | 2019/10 | D | Android 9.0 "Pie" | |
| Motorola Razr (4G) | 2019/11 | P | Android 9.0 "Pie" | |
| Motorola One Hyper | 2020/01 | D | Android 10 | |
| Moto G8 Power | 2020/02 | D | Android 10 | |
| Moto G Power/Stylus | 2020/02 | D | Android 10 | |
| Moto G8 | 2020/03 | D | Android 10 | |
| Moto E6s (2020) | 2020/03 | D | Android 9.0 "Pie" | |
| Moto G8 Power Lite | 2020/04 | D | Android 9.0 "Pie" | |
| Motorola Edge/Edge+ | 2020/05 | D | Android 10 | |
| Moto G Pro | 2020/05 | D | Android 10 | |
| Moto E (2020) | 2020/06 | D | Android 10 | |
| Moto G Fast | 2020/06 | D | Android 10 | |
| Motorola One Fusion+ | 2020/06 | D | Android 10 | |
| Motorola One Fusion | 2020/07 | D | Android 10 | |
| Moto G 5G Plus | 2020/07 | D | Android 10 | |
| Moto G9 Play | 2020/08 | D | Android 10 | |
| Moto G9 Plus | 2020/09 | D | Android 10 | |
| Moto E7 Plus | 2020/09 | D | Android 10 | |
| Motorola Razr (5G) | 2020/09 | P | Android 10 | |
| Moto G9 Power | 2020/12 | D | Android 10 | |
| Moto G 5G | 2020/12 | D | Android 10 | |
| Moto E7 | 2020/12 | D | Android 10 | |
| Moto G Play (2021) | 2021/01 | D | Android 10 | |
| Moto G Power (2021) | 2021/01 | P | Android 10 | |
| Moto G Stylus (2021) | 2021/01 | P | Android 10 | |
| Moto E6i | 2021/02 | P | Android 10 | |
| Moto E7 Power | 2021/02 | P | Android 10 | |
| Moto G10 | 2021/03 | P | Android 11 | |
| Moto G30 | 2021/03 | P | Android 11 | |
| Moto G10 Power | 2021/03 | P | Android 11 | |
| Moto G50 | 2021/04 | P | Android 11 | |
| Moto G100 | 2021/04 | P | Android 11 | |
| Moto G60 | 2021/04 | P | Android 11 | |
| Moto G40 Fusion | 2021/05 | P | Android 11 | |
| Moto G20 | 2021/06 | P | Android 11 | |
| Moto G Stylus 5G | 2021/06 | P | Android 11 | |
| Motorola Defy (2021) | 2021/07 | P | Android 10 | |
| Motorola Edge 20 | 2021/08 | P | Android 11 | |
| Moto G22 | 2022/04 | P | Android 12 | |
| Motorola Edge 50 fusion | 2024/05 | P | Android 14 | |
| Motorola Signature 27 | 2026/11 | P | Android 17 | |

==== Mobile phone accessories ====
- TXTR

=== Smartwatches ===
- Motoactv (2011)
- Moto 360 (2014)
- Moto 360 (2015)
- Moto 360 Sport

==== Accessories ====
===== Bluetooth =====
- HT820 Bluetooth stereo wireless headset
- HF850 Bluetooth Car Adapter
- H3-bluetooth Bluetooth Headset
- H350 Bluetooth Headset
- H500 Bluetooth Headset
- H605 Bluetooth Headset
- H700 Bluetooth Headset
- HS805 Bluetooth Headset
- HS815 Bluetooth Headset
- HS820 Bluetooth Headset
- HS830 Bluetooth Headset
- HS850 Bluetooth Headset
- S9 Stereo Bluetooth Headset
- EQ5 Stereo Bluetooth Speaker

===== Wired =====
- P000 Y-splitter USB adapter
- GP300 Portable Radio
- GP340 Portable Radio
- GP360/380 Portable Radio
- GP68 Portable Radio
- GP328/HT750 Portable Radio
- GP338/339 Portable Radio
- GM360/380 Mobile Radio
- Visar Portable Radio
- MT1000 Portable Radio
- MT500 Portable Radio
- HT1000 Portable Radio
- MT2000 Portable Radio
- MTS2000 Portable radio
- DP/DM Series Portable/Mobile DMR Radio

=== Pagers ===
==== Tone and voice ====
- AT&T Bellboy
- AT&T Bellboy II
- BPR2000
- Dimension IV
- Director
- Director II
- Gold Line Pen Pager
- METRX
- Pageboy
- Pageboy II
- Sensar

==== Numeric ====
- Bravo Alpha
- Bravo/Lifestyle
- Bravo Classic
- Bravo FLX/Pro Encore
- Bravo Instinct
- Bravo Lx/Encore
- Bravo Plus
- BR850
- eXpress Xtra
- eXpress Xtra FLX
- GoldLine Pen
- LS350
- LS550
- LS750
- Pronto
- Pronto FLX
- Renegade
- Sensar DTMF
- Ultra Express

==== Alphanumeric ====
- Advisor
- Advisor Elite
- Advisor Gold
- Advisor Pro
- Advisor II
- Advisor Graphix
- Everest
- Memo Express
- Motorola Optrx
- Jazz
- Jazz Flex
- Scriptor
- Scriptor Linguist
- PageFinder
- CP1250

==== Message senders ====
- AlphaMate
- QuickWORD
- WordSender
- WordTrek
- WordTrek Plus

==== Two-Way Message Pagers ====
- Tango
- T900
- PF1500
- 9501 (Iridium Satellite Pager)
- PageWriter 2000

==== Voice ====
- PR2000
- PR3000
- PR5000

==== Fire pagers ====
- Motorola BMD pager
- MINITOR pager
- MINITOR II
- MINITOR III
- MINITOR IV
- MINITOR V
- Motorola PageBoy I
- Motorola PageBoy II
- Motorola Skyfire
- Motorola Skyfire II

=== Two-way radios ===
==== Mobile radios ====
- Project 25 in vehicle radios
  - APX 1500
  - APX 4500
  - APX 6500
  - APX 7500 (The first "Dual-Band" Offering. Discontinued)
  - APX 8500
  - APX Dual Radio
  - APX DVR-LX P25 Digital Vehicular Repeater
  - APX VRX1000 Vehicle Radio Extender
- ASTRO Spectra
- ASTRO Spectra Plus (Offered XTL features in an ASTRO Spectra package)
- CDM750
- CDM1250
- CDM1550
- CLS1413
- GM300 (6, 8 or 16 channels)
- M10 (a single channel GM300)
- M120 (a two channel GM300)
- M130 (a two channel GM300)
- Maratrac
- Maxtrac
- Maxar
- MC Micro
- Motrar (Trunked version of the Maxar)
- Micom (HF SSB Series)
- Micor
- Mitrek
- Motrek
- Mocom
- Mostar
- Mototrbo/XPR Series (ETSI DMR Series)
- Motrac
- Moxy
- MCS 2000
- Radius M10, M110, M120, M206, M208, M216, GM300
- Spectra
- Syntor, Syntor X, Syntor X9000
- T-power
- Traxar
- Syntrx
- Syntrx Plus
- XTL 1500
- XTL 2500
- XTL 5000
- XPR 5550
- XPR 5350
- XPR 5580
- XPR 5380

==== Walkie-talkies ====
- SCR-536
- Project 25 professional grade public safety radios currently for sale
  - APX 900
  - APX 3000
  - APX 4000
  - APX 4000XH
  - APX 6000
  - APX 6000XE
  - APX 8000
  - APX 8000H
  - APX 8000XE
  - APX 8000HXE
  - APX N30
  - APX N50
  - APX N70
  - APX NEXT
  - APX NEXT XE
  - APX NEXT XN
  - SRX 2200
- BPR 40
- DTR 650
- HT-100
- HT 200
- HT 220
- MT-500
- MX-300, MX-300S
- HT 90, HT 440
- HT600, HT600E, HT800, MT1000, MTX800, MTX810, MTX900, and P200
- GP300
- GP900, GP1200, HT1000, HT1100, JT1000, MT2000, MT2100, MTS-LS, MTX838, MTX2000, MTX8000, MTX9000, MTS2000, MTS2010, MTS2013, PTX1200, and PTX3600
- STX
- GTX
- ASTRO Digital Saber
- Systems Saber
- European Saber MX 1000, MX 2000, MX 3000, Stornophone 7000
- Talkabout
- TLKR Series
- Visar
- HT 750, HT 1250, HT 1550
- WHK-R Series
- XTS Series
- XPR series
- Spirit
- Radius GP 300

==== Infrastructure ====
===== Base stations =====
Fixed Voice-Only Base Stations

- MICOR Base Station (Voice)
- MDB Base Station (Voice)
- MSY Base Station (Voice)
- MTR 300 Base Station (Voice)
- MTR 2000 Base Station (Voice)
- MSR 2000 Base Station (Voice)
- MSF 5000 Base Station (Voice)
- MCR 100 / Radius R100 Base Station (Voice)
- GR 1225 / RKR 1225 Base Station (Voice)

Data Base Stations

- Gemini Base Station (MDC4800 Data)
- DataTAC DSS-III Base Station (Data)
- MSF 5000 DBS (Data Base Station)
- Quantar DBS (Data Base Station)

Integrated Voice & Data Stations (IV&D)

- Quantro Base Station (Voice & Data)
- Quantar Base Station (Voice & Data)
- MTR 3000 Base Station (Voice & Data)
- GTR 8000 Base Station (Voice & Data)

Transportable Base Stations

- XTVA Transportable Base Station (Analog & Digital Voice)
- MX-based Suitcase Repeater (Analog/CVSD Encrypted Voice)
- PDR 3500 Suitcase Repeater (Analog & Digital Voice)

Paging Base Stations

- MICOR PURC Paging Station (Based on the MICOR Product)
- PURC 5000 Paging Station (Based on the MSF 5000 Product)
- NUCLEUS Paging Station
- NUCLEUS II Paging Station
- PeopleFinder series on-site Paging Stations

===== Fixed Repeaters =====
- ATS Cumulative Repeater
- MSY Repeater Station (Based on the MOTRAC design)
- MICOR Repeater Station
- GR 300 (Based on two GM 300 Mobile Radios)
- GR 500 (Based on two GM 300 Mobile Radios)
- GR 1225 / RKR 1225 Conventional Repeaters
- MCR 100 / Radius R100 Conventional Repeaters
- GTR 8000 Conventional & Trunked Repeater
- MSR 2000 Conventional Repeater
- MTR 2000 Conventional & Trunked Repeater
- MTR 3000 Conventional & Trunked Repeater
- MSF 5000 Conventional & Trunked Repeater
- PDR 3500 Portable Analog & P25 Repeater
- Quantar Conventional & Trunked Repeater
- Quantro Conventional & Trunked Repeater
- XPR 8300 Conventional & Trunked Repeater
- XPR 8400 Conventional & Trunked Repeater

Vehicle-based Repeaters

- PAC, PAC-PL & PAC-RT Mobile Repeaters
- VRS•EP Mobile Repeater
- VRS 750 Mobile Repeater
- Futurecom DVRS Mobile Repeater (a third-party product)

===== Site & Zone Controllers =====
- 6809 Trunked Central Controller (SmartNET, SmartZone Prime & Remote)
- MTC 3600 SmartNET/SmartZone 4.1 Controller (Prime & Remote)
- PSC 9600 Astro25 6.x Site Controller (Remote Sites)
- MTC 9600 ASTRO25 Site Controller (Prime Sites)
- GCP 8000 ASTRO25 Site Controller (Prime & Remote Sites)
- MZC 3000 SmartZone 4.1 Zone Controller (4.1 Master Sites)
- MZC 5000 Astro25 7.x Zone Controller (7.x Master Sites)

===== Voting Comparators =====
- TAC (Total Area Coverage) Voting Comparator (Supporting analog calls)
- SpectraTAC Voting Comparator (Supporting analog calls)
- SECURENET DIGITAC Voting Comparator (Supporting analog & CVSD encrypted calls)
- ASTROTAC Comparator (Supporting VSELP & IMBE (P25) Digital Calls)
- ASTROTAC 3000 Voting Comparator (Supporting analog & IMBE (P25) Digital calls)
- GCM 8000 Voting Comparator (Supporting Astro25 Trunked & Conventional)
- MLC 8000 Voting Comparator (Supporting P25 & Analog calls)

===== Satellite and Auxiliary Receivers =====
- TAC Satellite Receiver (Based on the MOTRAC Receiver Design)
- SpectraTAC Satellite Receiver (Based on the MICOR Receiver Design)
- MSF 5000 Satellite Receiver (a receive-only version of the MSF 5000 Base Station)
- MTR 2000 Satellite Receiver (a receive-only version of the MTR 2000 Base Station)
- ASTROTAC Satellite Receiver (Based on the Quantar Receiver Design)
- Quantar Satellite Receiver (a receive-only version of the Quantar Base Station)
- MTR 3000 Satellite Receiver (an analog, receive-only version of the MTR 3000 Base Station)
- GPW 8000 Satellite Receiver (a receive-only version of the GTR 8000 Base Station)

== Telemetry Radios ==
- APCOR (Advanced Portable Coronary Observation Radio)
- RNET Telemetry Radio

=== Other wireless ===
- MeshTrack – An integrated non-GPS location system and data network that can be deployed to incident sites by public safety organizations
- Bag Phone was a portable cellular telephone manufactured from 1992 to 2000

== Wireline communications ==
=== Cable TV and broadband ===
In 2012, Motorola Mobility's home unit was acquired by Arris Group, which includes set-top boxes (e.g. VIP series), and SURFboard cable modems.

==== TV receivers ====
- DCT2000
- DCT6412 HDTV DVR
- DCT3412 HDTV digital tuner

==== Cable modems ====
- SURFboard SB3100 cable modem
- SURFboard SB4100 cable modem
- SURFboard SB4200 cable modem
- SURFboard SB5100 cable modem
- SURFboard SB5101 cable modem
- SURFboard SB5120 cable modem
- SURFboard SB5102 cable modem
- SURFboard SB6120 cable modem
- SURFboard SB6121 cable modem
- SURFboard SB6141 cable modem
- SURFboard SB6180 cable modem
- SURFboard SB6182 cable modem
- SURFboard SB6183 cable modem
- SURFboard SB6220 cable modem
- MB7220 cable modem
- MB7420 cable modem
- SURFboard SBV5121 voice cable modem
- SURFboard SBV5122 voice cable modem
- SBG900 wireless cable modem gateway
- SBG900i wireless cable modem gateway
- SBG901 wireless cable modem gateway
- SBG941 wireless cable modem gateway
- SBG6580 wireless cable modem gateway
- SBG6782-AC wireless cable modem gateway
- SBG6900-AC wireless cable modem gateway
- MG7310 wireless cable modem gateway

=== Voice over IP ===
- VT1000 and VT1005v analog telephony adapters. Has been distributed by Vonage.
