= C115 =

C115 may refer to

- Occupation Safety and Health Convention of 1981, an international labor standard
- Motorola C115, a GSM mobile phone from Motorola
