= I860 =

i860 may refer to:

- Intel i860, a VLIW RISC microprocessor
- Intel 860 Chipset
- Motorola i860, a mobile phone

== See also ==
- 1860
