= A760 =

A760 may refer to:

- Motorola A760, a mobile phone produced by Motorola
- Samsung SPH-A760, another mobile phone by Samsung Telecommunications
- A760 road, a road between the British towns of Largs and Lochwinnoch
