= Motorola V360 =

Cell phone released in 2005

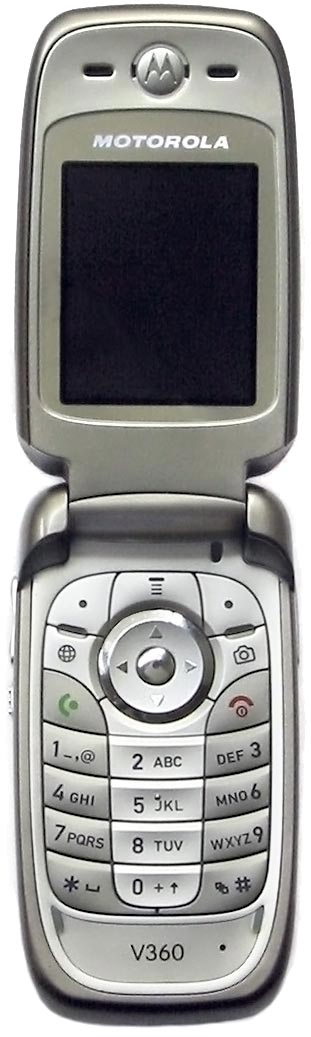
- A white Motorola V360
- Related: Motorola SLVR L7
- Compatible networks: GSM 900/1800/1900 (Tri-Band)
- Dimensions: 3.5 in × 1.9 in × 0.9 in (89 mm × 48 mm × 23 mm)
- Weight: 3.7 oz (100 g)
- Removable storage: microSD 512 MB max
- Display: 176x220 pixels, 18-bit (262000 Colors)
- Connectivity: miniUSB, Bluetooth 1.2

The Motorola V360 is a 2G clamshell-style mobile phone by Motorola, originally announced in February 2005. It was released on November 9, 2005, on T-Mobile US and was also released on other networks and countries.

The V360 is a mid-range handset positioned as the successor of the lower model V220 while incorporating many of the more advanced features from the Motorola V620. A stand out feature was the expandable memory using the card slot, something that was uncommon on clamshells at the time of the V360's release. It also had an internal antenna similar to the Motorola Razr V3.

Before the V360, the Motorola V220 was marketed in 2004 at the budget end (above the V180, with main extra being a VGA resolution camera, and below the V300). The V360's advanced features, including a 256k color display, the expandable memory and EDGE effectively made it supersede the V5xx range as the mid-level choice below the Razr V3 and further the smartphones like A910.
