= A910 =

A910 may refer to:

- Motorola A910, a mobile phone
- A910 CB, a main belt asteroid
- A910 FA, a main belt asteroid
- A910 road (Great Britain)
- A910 series, a walkman made by Sony
