= Motorola i920/i930 =

Wave of iDEN Protocol-based smartphones

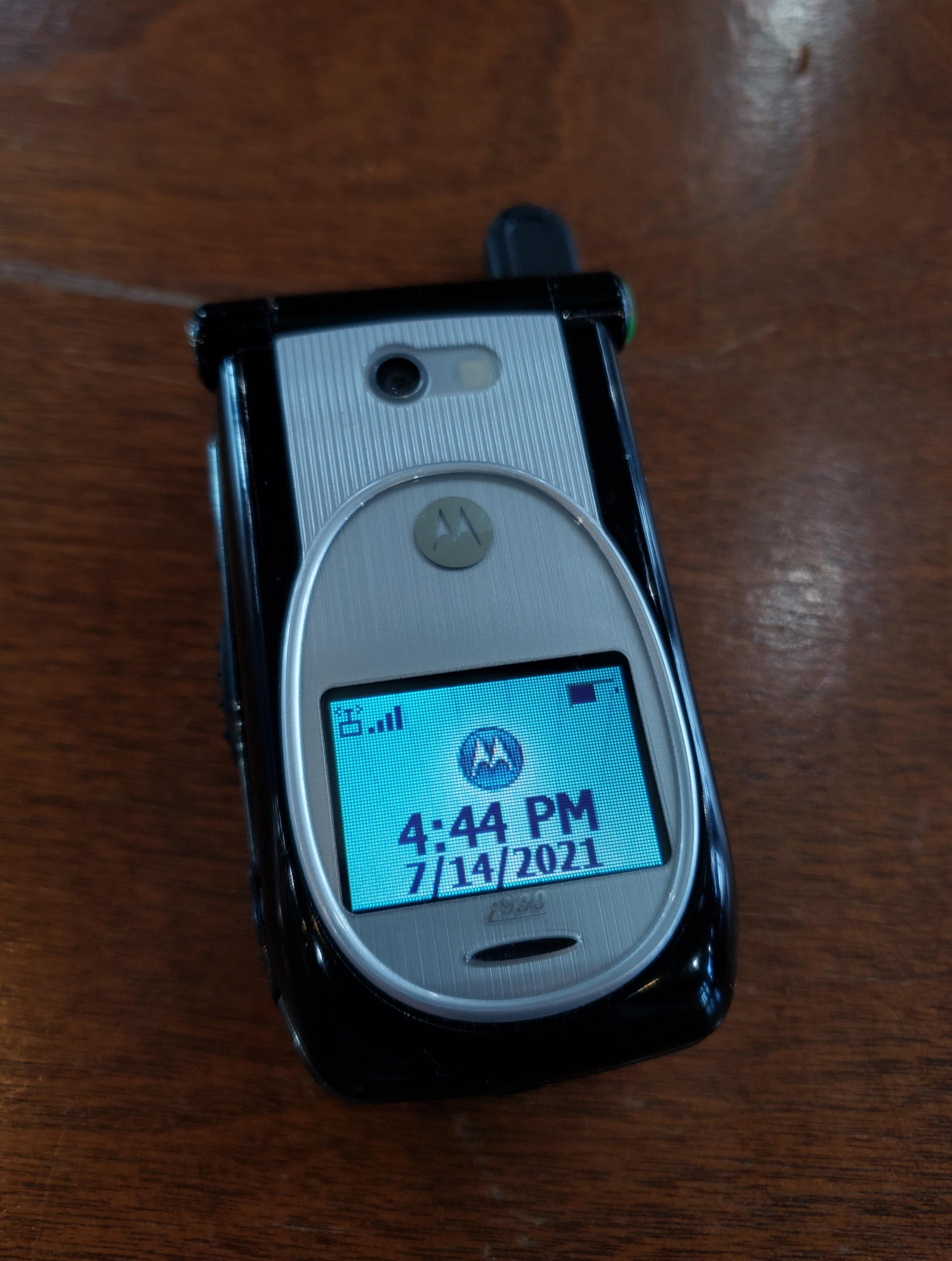
Motorola i930 connected to a GSM network. If the user was able to unlock this phone they could utilize the tri-band GSM radio

The Motorola i920/i930 is Motorola's first wave of iDEN Protocol-based smartphones.

== Background ==
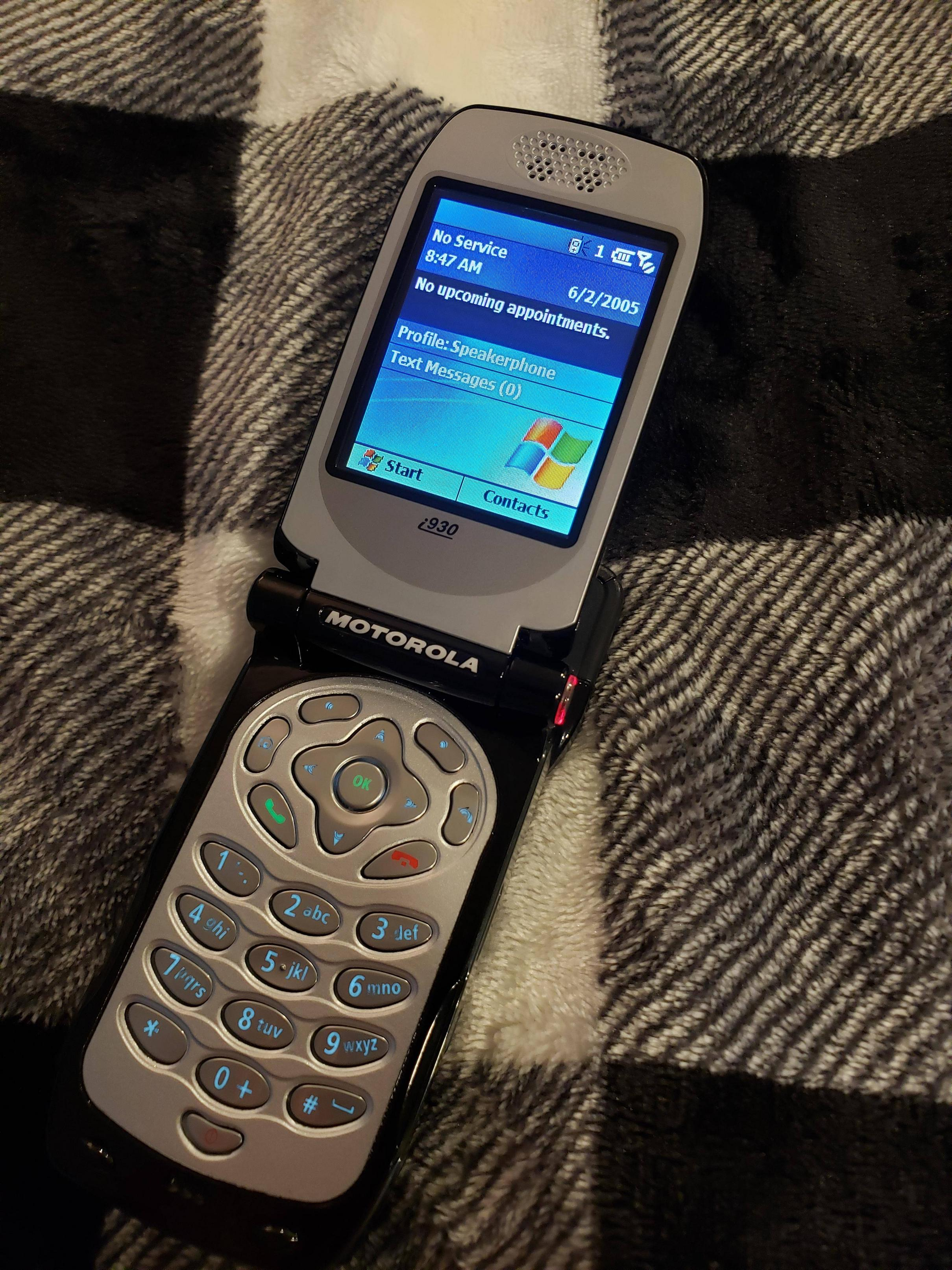

Both the i920 and the i930 were released for use with Sprint Nextel's iDEN Network, marketed as a phone that Sprint Nextel iDEN customers can take without having to resort to an alternate phone number outside the Continental US. In the past, world travellers subscribing to Nextel iDEN Services generally have to carry an alternate phone (i.e. the V180) to roam around the world. With the i920 or the i930, one phone, one phone number can be used at any part of the world which has a GSM network. The phone won't be made available to either Boost Mobile or Southern Linc networks, given that Boost Mobile is a prepaid service and Southern Linc is a regional carrier serving mainly Alabama and Georgia.

=== i920/i930 specifications ===
As of the February 16, 2006 update, the specifications are based from the Phonescoop and the Sprint Nextel intel unless otherwise footnoted:

- Three-Mode GSM with iDEN 800 and Nextel Worldwide Service Support
- Clamshell Form-Factor with extendable antenna and Easy-Flip Button
- 176x220 16-Bit Internal TFT Color Screen (65536 Colors) with 96x65 STN LCD 4096 External Color Screen
- Windows Mobile 2003 Second Edition Build 4.21.1088 with the following:

- 22MB Smartphone-Reserved Memory
- 26MB In-Smartphone Memory for Storage
- 32MB SDRAM
- 64MB EEPROM

- 310K-pixel VGA (640×480) camera with LED flash and 10-second video recording— only available with the i930
- Multimedia and Text Messaging Service
- WiDEN high-speed data support
- SD/MMC card compatibility (Does not support SDIO)
- Speakerphone
- Pocket Internet Explorer with Pocket Outlook
- MSN Messenger
- Windows Media Player 10 Support
- Active Sync
- T9 Text Entry System
- Java ME
- MMS Support
- GPS and airplane (disable RF) mode
- Length of 3.5", Width of 1.9", Depth of 1.2"
- Weight of 5.9 ounces with included battery
- 165 minutes talk time (245 minutes for 6:1 networks), 65 hours standby
- 880 mAh lithium-ion battery included

=== Pricing and release information ===
At the initial release of the Motorola i930, the phone was released for sale on October 6, 2005, but the demand and anticipation has been extremely high when the phone first came out that it was backordered due to limited stock. Popularity and demand of the i930 eclipsed when potential buyers found out that stock was grievously scarce, followed by a steep and gradual decline in demand at the release of the i870.

In order to adhere to corporation-wide policies of camera absence in electronic devices, Motorola released a non-camera version of the i930 called the i920 sometime in February. While the technology on both the i920 and the i930 are considered to be obsolete by some, the pricing map is as follows:

Phone Make and Model	2-Year Pricing	1-Year Pricing	MSRP
Motorola i930	$349.99	$429.99	$499.99
Motorola i920	$324.99	$399.99	$474.99

The 2-year agreement price is available to new Nextel subscribers, as well as all current Nextel subscribers, which is specifically outlined in the Nextel Upgrade Frequency Policy Pages. Firm-related incentives, Equipment/Phone exemptions, and other perks may be given at the discretion of Sprint Nextel. The following firms currently have Equipment/Phones exempt from the NUFP plus Two-Year Incentives:

- NUFP Clause for Western States Contracting Alliance Members

Nextel's Upgrade Frequency Policy (UFP) was enacted in February 2005 so that existing customers could not buy inexpensive phones for the low 2-year contract price (free in the case of the i205) and then resell them.

== Known criticisms ==
The phone has been criticized for its lack of Bluetooth, long delay to release, the lack of Motorola's MotoTalk-branded Off-Network Walkie-Talkie and its use of Windows Mobile 2003 over Windows Mobile 5.0 as well as not being upgradeable to that version. Many also ciritcize the i930 and i920 as having WiDEN support built-in, but inactive when shipped to the consumer. Those who have unlocked the WiDEN capabilities upon first release were mortified to find Sprint shutting down the WiDEN service from the NEXTEL towers when rebanding began in the 800 MHz frequencies used by NEXTEL handsets. Sprint's explanation was that they needed to regain the channels used by WiDEN to support cellular calls during the rebanding. Those markets who have had their rebanding completed have yet to see WiDEN services restored to the towers in their areas.

Motorola has stated in their FAQ page that the i930 cannot use SDIO Cards nor can it be upgraded to Windows Mobile 2005 no matter the cause.

=== Application lockup controversy ===
Application-minded experts heavily criticised the Motorola i930 for the following reasons:

- Application-Locking—The Motorola i930 could only install smartphone applications digitally signed and/or authorized by Sprint Nextel. Other Applications which are "Windows Mobile-Neutral" are likely to fail.
- Installation Issues—An application that is digitally approved by Sprint Nextel can also fail to install.

An online petition was started and some owners checked into the possibility of a class action lawsuit because the application locked phone would not perform as advertised. This controversy became less important when some creative forum members came up with a program called NUNLOCK to decertify and fix common issues with the i930. The i930 could also be unlocked using a trial version of Sprite backup and a modified backup file created by Tzarcone, one prominent developer of tools for the i930.

NOTE: All criticisms and rumors pertaining to the Motorola i930 can be found at either the iDEN Custom, Dave's PDA, The Howard Forums, or the iDEN Insider websites, though criticisms are not yet final as of right now.

== Likely market ==
Being an "All-in-One" Nextel Phone with iDEN, WiDEN, and GSM in one, both the i920 and the i930 are targeted mainly to executives who require one single number to be used anywhere in the world where there is a GSM network, it also has the benefit of using Microsoft Outlook to synchronize schedules and meeting information.

Furthermore, the i920 is targeted towards segments in which its upper management wants its subordinates to have a smartphone, but without a camera, since a camera is likely to pose security risks.

== See also ==
- Sprint Nextel
- Microsoft Windows Mobile
- iDEN Technology
- WiDEN Technology
- GSM Technology
- Motorola iDEN phone models
