= Motorola i886 =

Cellular telephone

The Motorola i886 is the first ever qwerty slider style cellular telephone designed for use with iDEN Networks. It was released for Nextel on January 9, 2011.

== Background ==
Like the Motorola i850, i760, and even the i920/i930, the i886 supports both iDEN 800mhz and 900mhz bands. The iDEN 900 band is also supported pending Sprint's petition to move all iDEN spectrum away from the 800 band for public safety workers to utilize it.

The i886 is an Android device that features an alphanumeric keypad and a slide-out QWERTY keyboard, but the screen does not support touch functions. It utilizes Bluetooth2.1 support with OBEX and hands-free earpiece compliance.

The i886 adds selective dynamic group call, MP3 support, MIDI/WAV support, and TransFlash/Micro SD support for cards up to 32 GB-to-date. The i886 also features a digital camera, but the resolution has been increased to 2 megapixels, and video recording.

The i885 is the first phone to feature mo-sms on Sprint Nextel's iDEN network.

There are currently no criticisms as of this time, neither there are any opportunities to find any for the timebeing.

== See also ==
- Motorola iDEN phone models
- Sprint Nextel
