= Motorola i455 =

Mobile phone

The Motorola i455 was an iDEN mobile phone. It replaced the discontinued i450. The i455 is usually black. It has a 600 entry phonebook, push-to-talk service, polyphonic ringtones, speakerphone and messaging.

== See also ==
- List of Motorola products
- Motorola
