= Motorola i760 =

- Weight: 4.7 oz (130 g)
- Battery: Talk: 4.1 hours max. (245 minutes); Standby: 70 hours max. (2.9 days)
- Display: Type: LCD (Color TFT/TFD); Resolution: 176 x 220 pixels; Colors: 262,144 (18-bit)

The Motorola i760 is a mobile telephone with push-to-talk capability, Java apps, GPS navigation, speakerphone, voice dialing and voice record. It can hold up to 600 phone book entries. It supports MP3 format and an internal of 262k. It also has a stub antenna as well as dual color screens.

== See also ==
- List of Motorola products
