= Moto G 5G =

Android smartphones developed by Motorola Mobility

Moto G 5G Motorola One 5G Ace
- Manufacturer: Motorola Mobility
- Type: Phablet
- Series: Moto G Family; Motorola One
- First released: G 5G: 7 December 2020; 5 years ago One 5G Ace: 13 January 2021; 5 years ago
- Related: Moto G 5G Plus
- Form factor: Slate
- Dimensions: 166.1 mm × 76.1 mm × 9.9 mm (6.54 in × 3.00 in × 0.39 in)
- Weight: 212 g (7.5 oz)
- Operating system: Android 10
- System-on-chip: Qualcomm SM7225 Snapdragon 750G
- CPU: 2x 2.2 GHz Kryo 570 & 6x 1.8 GHz Kryo 570
- GPU: Adreno 619
- Memory: 4 or 6 GB
- Storage: 64 or 128 GB
- Removable storage: microSDXC, up to 1 TB
- Battery: 5000 mAh
- Rear camera: 48 MP, f/1.7, 26mm, 1/2", 0.8 μm (wide) + 8 MP, f/2.2, 1.12 μm (ultrawide) + 2 MP, f/2.4 (macro) 4K@30fps, 1080p@30/60fps, PDAF, AF, gyro-EIS, HDR, panorama
- Front camera: 16 MP, f/2.2, 1.0 μm 1080p@30fps, HDR
- Display: 6.7 in (17.0 cm) LTPS IPS LCD capacitive touchscreen, 2400 × 1080 (393 ppi with 20:9 aspect ratio), HDR10
- Sound: Mono loudspeaker, 3.5mm audio jack
- Connectivity: 2G EDGE, GPRS/3G HSPA, HSPA+/4G LTE, LTE+, 5G, NFC, Wi-Fi 802.11a/b/g/n/ac 2.4GHz + 5GHz, Bluetooth 5.1, GPS, A-GPS, GLONASS, LTEPP, SUPL, Galileo
- Data inputs: Fingerprint (rear-mounted), proximity sensor, Gyroscope, compass, Accelerometer, ambient light sensor
- Model: XT2113
- Development status: released
- Website: Moto G 5G; Motorola One 5G Ace

Moto G 5G and Motorola One 5G Ace are Android phablets developed by Motorola Mobility, a subsidiary of Lenovo. The Moto G 5G branded variant was initially released in December 2020. In the United States, it was released as Motorola One 5G Ace on 13 January 2021.

== Hardware ==
=== CPU ===
The device comes with the Snapdragon 750G System on Chip, a fast mid-range ARM SoC with 8 CPU Kryo 570 cores. It was the first device released in India to use this chip.

- Two fast ARM Cortex-A77 cores at up to 2.2 GHz
- Six small ARM Cortex-A55 cores at up to 1.8 GHz

and a fast X52 5G modem (up to 3700 Mbps download). The SoC is manufactured in the modern 8 nm process.

=== Camera ===
==== Rear Camera System ====
The device comes with 3 camera system, as well as:

- 48MP (f/1.7, 0.8 um) camera which outputs 12MP (f/1.7, 1.6 um) Quad Pixel image using pixel binning for image quality improvement and uses PDAF
- 8MP (f/2.2, 1.12 um) | 118° ultra-wide angle
- 2MP (f/2.4, 1.75 um) | Macro Vision camera | AF

and a single LED flash.

==== Front Camera ====
Device comes with a single punch hole front camera,

- 16MP (f/2.2, 1 um) sensor that outputs 4MP (f/2.2, 2 um) Quad Pixel image

== Software ==
The device launched with Android 10 and as of October 2021 devices have started receiving the Android 11 update.

The device comes with minimal customization to stock Android experience. It includes Motorola My UX Gesture features such as Quick Capture, which launches the device camera with a twist gesture performed with wrist while holding the device, Fast Flashlight which turns on the device flashlight with two chopping motions.

=== OS Update History ===
System Updates
Android Version	Build	Release date	Note
Android 10	QZK30.Q4-40-52	January 2021	Device released with Android Q; Android security patch update; Stability improvement (Bug Fix update)
Android 10	QZK30.Q4-40-81-3	April 2021	Android security patch update, and; Stability improvement (Bug Fix update)
Android 10	QZKS30.Q4-40-81-3-2	June 2021	Android security patch update
Android 10	QZKS30.Q4-40-81-3-4	July 2021	Android security patch update
Android 11	RZK31.Q3-25-15	October 2021	Updated to Android R
Android 11	RZKS31.Q3-25-15-1	December 2021	Android security patch update
Android 11	RZKS31.Q3-25-15-3	February 2022	Android security patch update
Android 11	RZKS31.Q3-25-15-5	April 2022	Android security patch update
Android 11	RZKS31.Q3-25-15-7	June 2022	Android security patch update
Android 11	RZKS31.Q3-25-15-8	July 2022	Android security patch update
Android 11	RZKS31.Q3-25-15-9	September 2022	Android security patch update
Android 11	RZKS31.Q3-25-18-7	December 2022	Android security patch update, and; Stability improvement (Bug Fix update)

== Variants ==
Variants
Brand	Model	Region	Bands
motorola one 5G ACE	XT2113-2	USA	5G NR: 2/5/25/41/66/71; 4G LTE: 1/2/3/4/5/7/8/12/13/14/17/18/19/20/25/26/29/30/38/39/40/41/66/71; 3G: 1/2/4/5/8; 2G: 2/3/5/8
moto G 5G	XT2113-3	Asia, Europe, South America	5G NR: 1/3/5/7/8/28/38/41/66/77/78; 4G LTE 1/2/3/4/5/7/8/12/18/19/20/26/28/38/39/40/41/42/43/66; 3G: 1/2/4/5/8; 2G: 2/3/5/8

== Reception ==
The reviewers praised the device for its clean user interface (minimal and tasteful customizations to Stock Android experience), good battery life, good performance and good camera. While criticising comparatively slow charging, bland design and average screen refresh rate.
