= Motorola i1 =

2010 smartphone

- Manufacturer: Motorola
- Type: Slate smartphone
- First released: United States June 20, 2010; 16 years ago (Boost Mobile)
- Dimensions: 118 mm (4.6 in) H 58 mm (2.3 in) W 12.8 mm (0.50 in) D
- Weight: 131 g (4.6 oz)
- Operating system: Android 1.5
- CPU: 500 MHz Freescale Zeus 2.0 CPU ARM1136 processor
- Memory: 256 MB RAM
- Storage: Flash memory: 512/256 MB user-accessible microSD slot: supports up to 32 GB
- Battery: 3.7 V 1400 mAh; Internal rechargeable removable lithium-ion battery
- Rear camera: 5 megapixel with autofocus
- Display: 320 x 480 px, 3.1 in (79 mm), HVGA, 64K (256K via hardware dithering) color LCD
- Connectivity: Wi-Fi (802.11b/g), Bluetooth 2.0+EDR, MicroUSB, A-GPS iDEN
- Data inputs: Multi-touch capacitive touchscreen display

The Motorola i1 is an Internet-enabled smartphone by Motorola, running the Android operating system designed by Google. It was the first Android smartphone for iDEN-based networks, which use older 2G technology rather than modern CDMA and GSM networks, and only support data rates up to 19.2 kbps. The Motorola i1 also uses Wi-Fi to access the Internet at higher speeds.

It was announced on March 23, 2010, and launched with Boost Mobile in the US on June 20, 2010, for a retail price of $350 without a contract.

The Motorola i1 is available in the United States for Boost Mobile, Sprint Nextel and SouthernLINC, in Canada for Telus (Mike) and in Mexico and other Latin American countries for Nextel.

== See also ==
- List of Android devices
- Android (operating system)
- Galaxy Nexus
