= Motorola Homesight =

Motorola Homesight is a brand name for a range of home security and automation products marketed in the U.S. and UK, which include separate items and a product package. The latter is marketed and sold as a kit and the product range offers flexibility in choice of accessories with which the customer can expand the kit into a more complex system.

== Description ==
As per Motorola's marketing material, the system uses a broadband Internet connection in order for the customer to stay connected to their home and its other residents through the kit owner's computer or compatible mobile phone. Sensor-detected activities are alerted and/or notified of to the customer and up to seven other customer-designated persons by the system.

Wired	Camera		— All-optional accessories supported by the system
Wireless	Camera		Sensors for...					Repeater	Siren	Power controller	Keypad:
Wireless	Day	Day/night	motion	doors	windows	temperature	water	Repeater	Siren	Power controller	kit	keys

== Technical disadvantages ==
Although the XG1000 gateway does NOT require a host PC (the system needs a PC only to be configured, not for normal steady state operations), the less expensive USB gateway system requires that its user's computer be turned on all the time, but such an always-on requirement is a disfavour in places with otherwise old electrical equipment and wiring (may be cause for fires in case of failing cables or connections) or unstable power delivery. The latter may be mitigated by the use of a UPS for the computer and some combination of backup power sources, such as diesel generator, solar panels, a wind turbine or other off-the-grid energy sources. Installation and maintenance costs may vary.

=== OS compatibility ===
The Homesight Wireless Easy Start Kit (HMEZ2000 and similar) software does not run on any variety of Macintosh or Linux/UNIX OS. Feedback received from both Motorola and the UK distributor (myhome247) is that there are no plans to provide a driver for Macintosh or Linux/UNIX OS's. The latest version of the Homesight software does run on Windows Vista and is available from www.myhome247.co.uk. The XG1000 base unit is completely stand-alone (does not require a USB internet connected host) and does not require an always-on computer but is $200 vs $100. There is currently no supported functionality for Windows 7 or Windows 8.

== Homesight Remote ==
Homesight Remote is a FOSS-licensed web interface to Homesight and is hosted at SourceForge. Information about its licensing is conflicting, as the home page for the project links to LGPL, while the project page shows GPL as its license. The Homesight Remote interface only runs on Windows XP.

== Competing systems ==
- AT&T Remote Monitor — Similar packaging and marketing as Motorola Homesight (through Xanboo), but controller and camera (Panasonic BL-C10) are different. The controller and camera can connect directly to a home network router (which in most cases can then be accessed through the Internet) without requiring a PC, though the list of remote automation devices seems smaller (shutoff key, alarm horn, etc. do not appear to be offered with this system).
- Home Heartbeat
- INSTEON and
- Smarthome of SmartLabs Inc.
- Z-Wave

== See also ==
- Home automation
- Intelligent home
- List of Motorola products
