= Motorola i58sr =

Cell phone

- First released: 2002; 24 years ago
- Dimensions: 5.25 in. x 2 in. x 1.25 in. (133mm x 51 mm x 31.8 mm)
- Weight: 6.5 oz (184 g)
- Memory: 250 names and numbers
- Battery: Lithium-ion
- Display: Grayscale

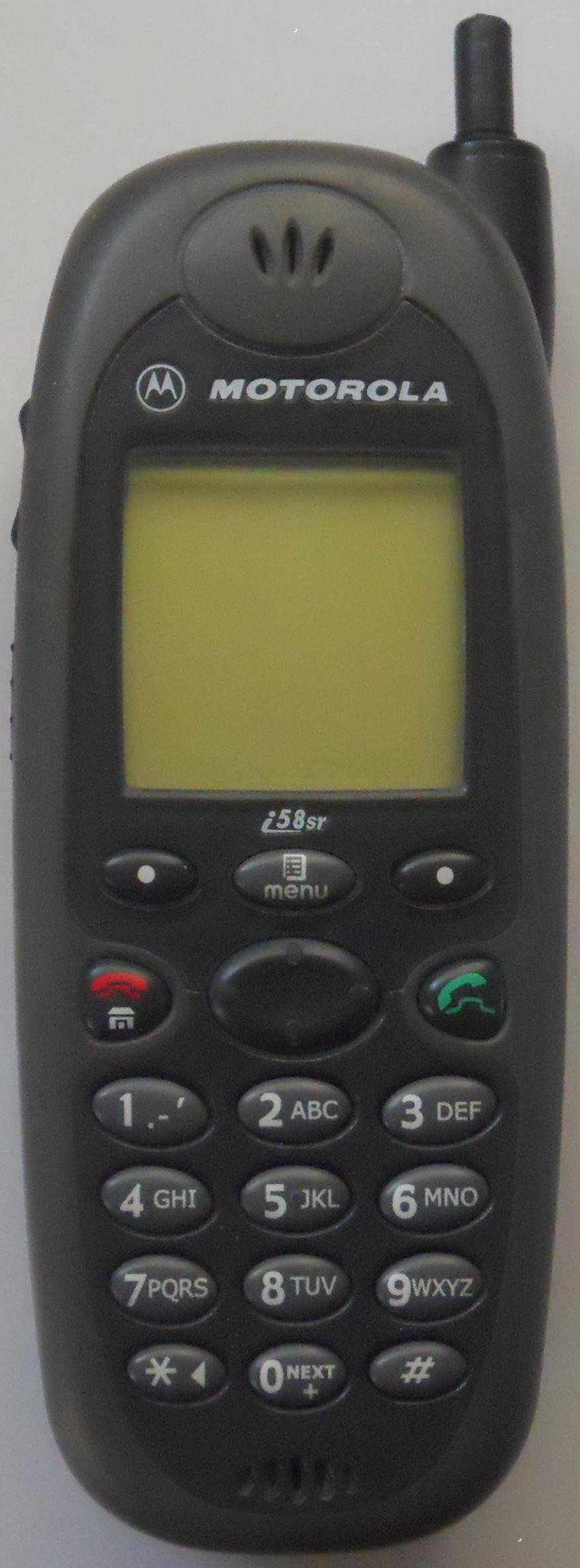

The Motorola i58sr is a candybar style cell phone manufactured by Motorola. It was released in 2002. It has a grayscale screen. The phone was used by Nextel and SouthernLINC.

The i58sr was designed as a rugged handset and complied with Military Standard 810 C/D/E requirements for resistance to dust, shock, and vibration. It also included integrated GPS functionality capable of displaying latitude and longitude coordinates. Other features included a built-in speakerphone, a 250-entry phonebook, text messaging, and support for Nextel's Direct Connect service.
