= Motorola Pageboy =

Pager

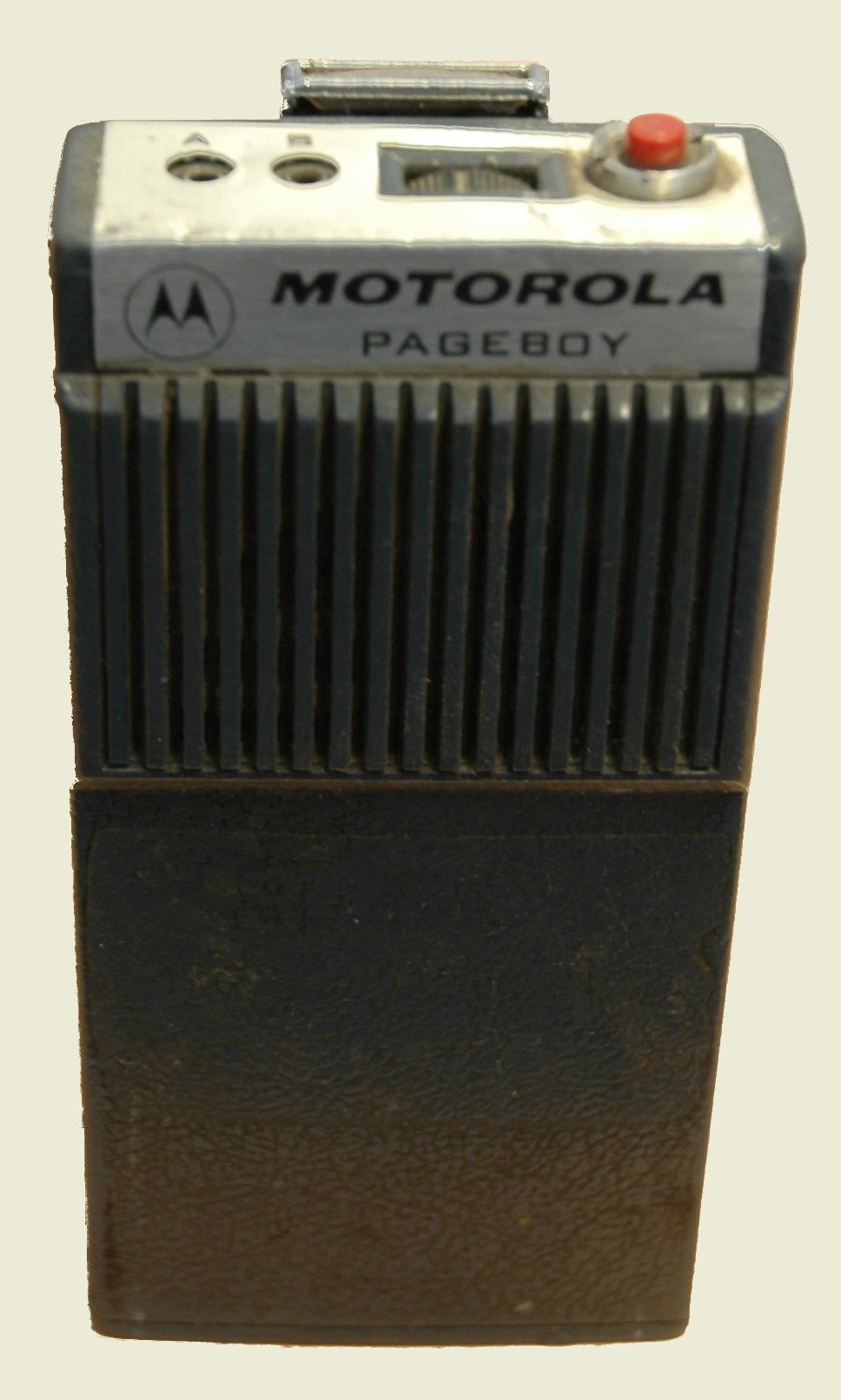
Motorola Pageboy, model H03BNC1102D0

Motorola Pageboy was a pager produced by Motorola. In the 1960s, when pagers were mainly used by medical professionals, the Pageboy was considered "cutting edge and compact", measuring 5.25 inches by 2.36 inches.

In 1967, low-frequency Pageboys operating in the 39-43 MHz band were priced at $180, while VHF units operating in the 151-159 MHz band cost $275 in the United States.

== See also ==
- List of Motorola products
