= Motorola C390 =

Mobile phone

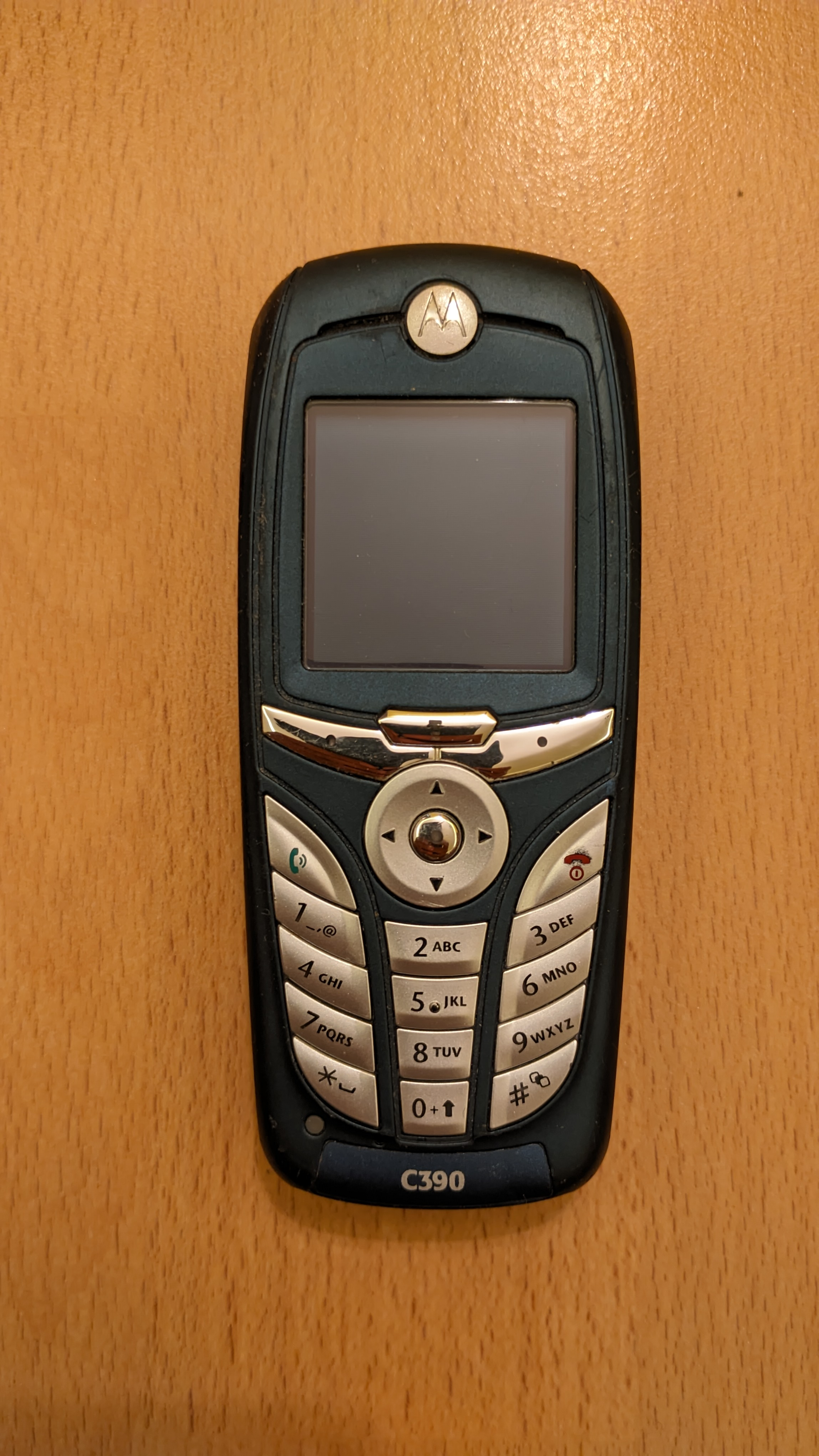
Motorola C390 front view

The Motorola C390 is a low-cost 900/1800/1900-band GSM mobile phone, manufactured by Motorola. It was released in the fourth quarter of 2004 as a successor to the C385. Main difference is the availability of bluetooth with the C390. Dimensions are 107 x 44 x 20.9 mm, weight is 91 g. It was available in Dark Blue Green Soft Feel and Dark Roast Black.

== Main features ==
- Downloadable wallpaper, screensaver and ringtones
- MMS, EMS and SMS
- WAP 2.0 and GPRS for Internet access
- 1.8 mb internal memory
- CSTN-display with 65.000 colours, 128 x 128 pixels, 5 lines
- Java, MIDP 2.0
- Bluetooth, v1.1
- phonebook with 500 entries
- GPRS (Class 10 - 32-48 kbit/s)
- USB
- iTap
