= Motorola C385 =

Mobile phone

The Motorola C385 is a low-cost 900/1800/1900-band GSM mobile phone, manufactured by Motorola. It was released in the first quarter of 2004 . Dimensions are 107 x 44 x 20.9 mm, weight is 80 g. It was available in Cosmic Universe Blue and Shadow Anthracite.

== Main Features ==
- Downloadable wallpaper, screensaver and ringtones
- MMS and SMS
- WAP 2.0 and GPRS for Internet access
- 1.8 mb internal memory
- CSTN-display with 65.000 colours, 128 x 128 pixels, 5 lines
- phonebook with 500 entries
- GPRS (Class 10 - 32-48 kbit/s)
- USB
- iTap
