= Motorola W233 Renew =

Mobile phone

W233 Renew
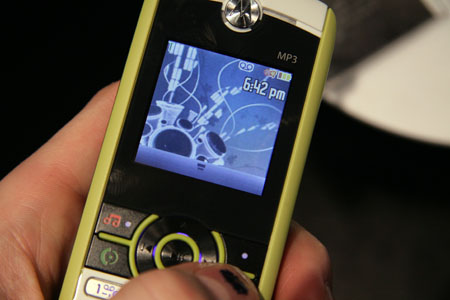
- Manufacturer: Motorola
- Availability by region: Q1 2009
- Predecessor: N/A
- Successor: Motorola W388 Renew+
- Compatible networks: GSM 850/1900, GPRS
- Form factor: Candybar
- Dimensions: 54×110.97×14.7 mm (2.126×4.369×0.579 in)
- Weight: 83 g (3 oz)
- Removable storage: MicroSD up to 2 GB
- Battery: Li-ion 940mAh
- Rear camera: none
- Display: 1.6-inch, 128 x 128 65k CSTN
- Connectivity: USB (mini)
- Data inputs: keypad, alphanumeric and T9

The Motorola W233 Renew is a cell phone designed and released in 2009 by Motorola. The phone was made available through distribution by T-Mobile USA and Fido Solutions. It also marketed in Mexico by Telcel and Venezuela by Movilnet.

Motorola claims it is the world's first mobile phone made using post-consumer recycled plastic; in this instance, recycled water bottles. The W233 Renew is also claimed as the world's first carbon neutral phone. Announced at CES on January 6, 2009, its plastic housing is also 100 percent recyclable.

== Affiliates ==
Through an alliance with Carbonfund.org, Motorola claims to have offset the carbon dioxide required to manufacture, distribute and operate the W233 Renew via investments in renewable energy sources and reforestation. After assessing its product lifecycle, the W233 earned Carbonfund.org's CarbonFree Product Certification.

== Recycling ==
The focus on use of natural resources extended to the packaging, which was reduced by 22 percent during design. All materials inside the box were printed using vegetable-based inks on 100 percent post-consumer recycled paper. A postage-paid recycling envelope was also included, so consumers could mail in their old phone for recycling at no extra cost.

== Features ==
The W233 Renew is an entry-level dual-band GSM phone, with a 128 x 128 pixel color display, a WAP browser, and support for 2GB of additional memory. It is not equipped with a camera. The phone's battery can handle talk time up to 9 hours (550 minutes) or standby for up to 18 days (450 hours).

The W233 Renew has a music player capable of handling MP3 files.

The phone uses CrystalTalk technology, which uses sound enhancement algorithms embedded within digital signal processor chips that claim to enhance clarity and quality with both speaker and articulation.
