= Motorola Rival =

Mobile phone

The Motorola Rival A455 is a Verizon Wireless cell phone launched in June 2009. The phone was a pocket sized slider with QWERTY keyboard for messaging; and also featured touch screen multimedia. The cell phone comes in Tin Silver and Purple.

It has a touch screen for a pop-up dial pad, and the contact search option, the rest are controlled by buttons on the phone.

The Motorola Rival A455 is on the Telus and Koodo wireless networks in Canada and the Verizon wireless network in the United States. It is also available on Open Mobile in the Caribbean.

It has a keyboard that slides from the right side, which keeps it relatively compact for a slider phone at 3.8 x 2 x 0.71-inches. The screen is partially touch-sensitive for on-screen dialing or selecting contacts. Texting, instant messaging, and e-mail are available on the Motorola A455 Rival.

There is a web browser for the Internet. Videos can be made and played back. Video on the Internet can be viewed.

Other add-ons include GPS navigation, as well as support for music files.

== Features ==
- 3G capable.
- Digital Camera with 2.0 MP with 7x digital zoom, fixed focus.
- Touch screen.
- Bluetooth for A2DP, HSP, HFP profiles.
- GPS.
- QWERTY Keyboard slider.
- Email and Internet access.
- Speakerphone.
- Phone-book can take 1,000 contacts.
- Messaging types MMS, SMS, EMS, IM, Email, WAP browser.
- Audio types: AAC, AAC+, AAC+ Enhanced, MIDI, MP3, WMA.
- Video capture, playback, and streaming, H.263, H.264, MPEG4, WMV.
- Memory: 130MB end user; up to 8GB expandable.
