= Motorola i835w =

Phone in the Motorola i835 series

- Compatible networks: iDen 800
- Form factor: Flip
- Dimensions: 3.35 in × .79 in × 1.77 in (85 mm × 20 mm × 45 mm)
- Weight: 5.25 oz (149 g)
- Memory: 2MB
- Display: 130x130 65K TFT LCD
- Connectivity: Accessory connector and headphone jack

The Motorola i835w is a phone in the Motorola i835 series.
