= Motorola i860 =

Mobile phone

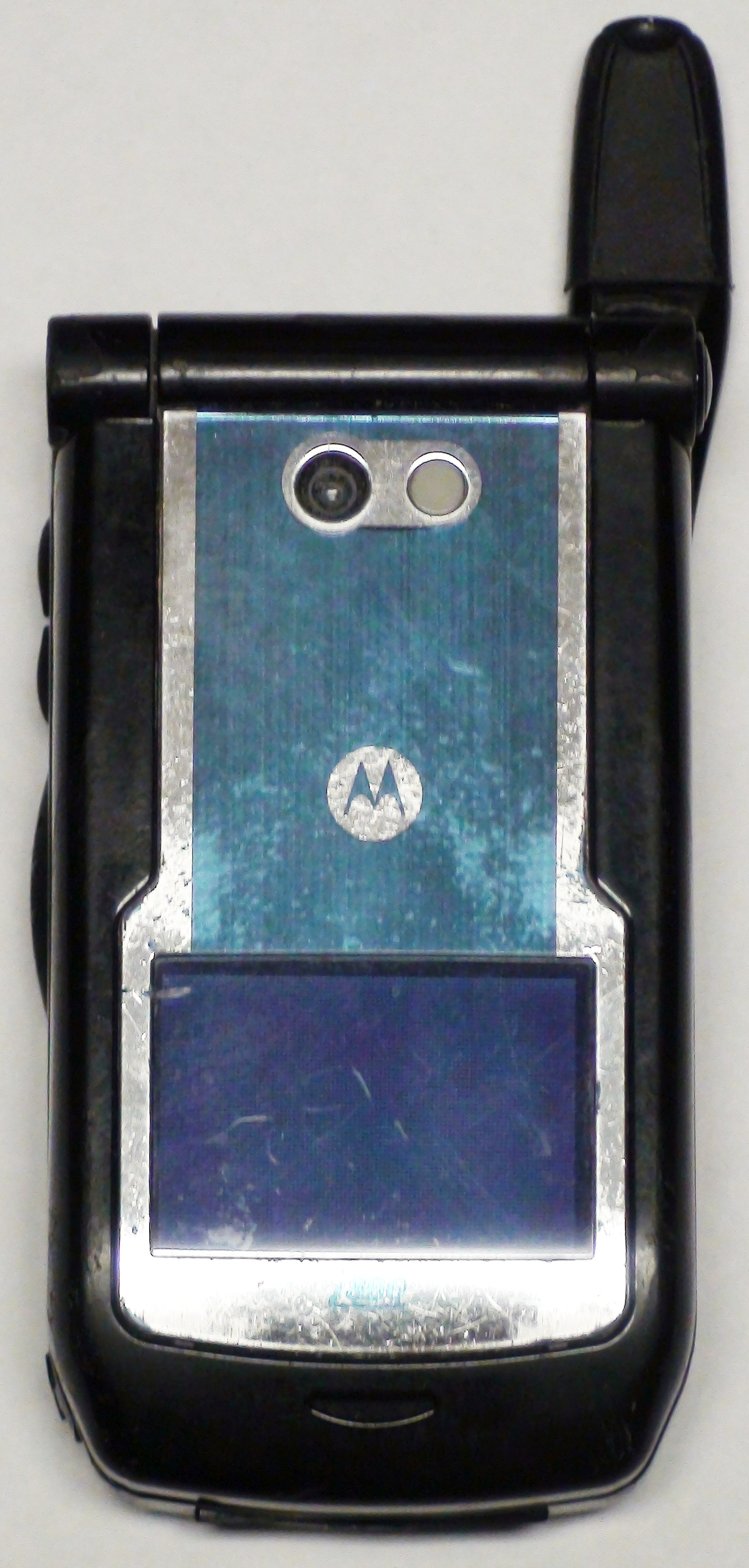
A Motorola i860 Originally Released In 2005.

The Motorola i860 was the first iDEN phone to feature a camera. The VGA camera was equipped with a 10-second video record option and built-in ultra-bright spotlight. As it was the first iDEN phone to feature a camera, it was also first to feature multimedia messaging as well as push-to-send, where contact information could be sent to another compatible device using the phone's push-to-talk button.

Its included demo games included Boulder Dash by Instacom ltd. and First Star Software. It also featured a version of the classic card game spades, developed by Skava. The i860 was also capable of holding up to 80+ downloaded ringtones, as well as the standard Nextel 600-contact storage capability. As with most camera phones, the wallpaper could be replaced with any one of the user's pictures.

i860 featured a GPS function, which pinpointed ones exact location anywhere on earth where service is available, as well as a useful internet function, which could be used for text messages, sending pictures, and video from phone to phone, or from phone to computer. The useful "Recent Calls List" showed the user all incoming, outgoing and missed calls, and the phone was equipped with an easy-to-use datebook which alerted the user (at ones convenience) to an upcoming task.

The i860 featured coast to coast walkie-talkie capability, intended to reduce cell phone traffic.

== See also ==
- Motorola iDEN phone models
- Sprint Nextel
- Telus
