= Motorola E770 =

Mobile phone

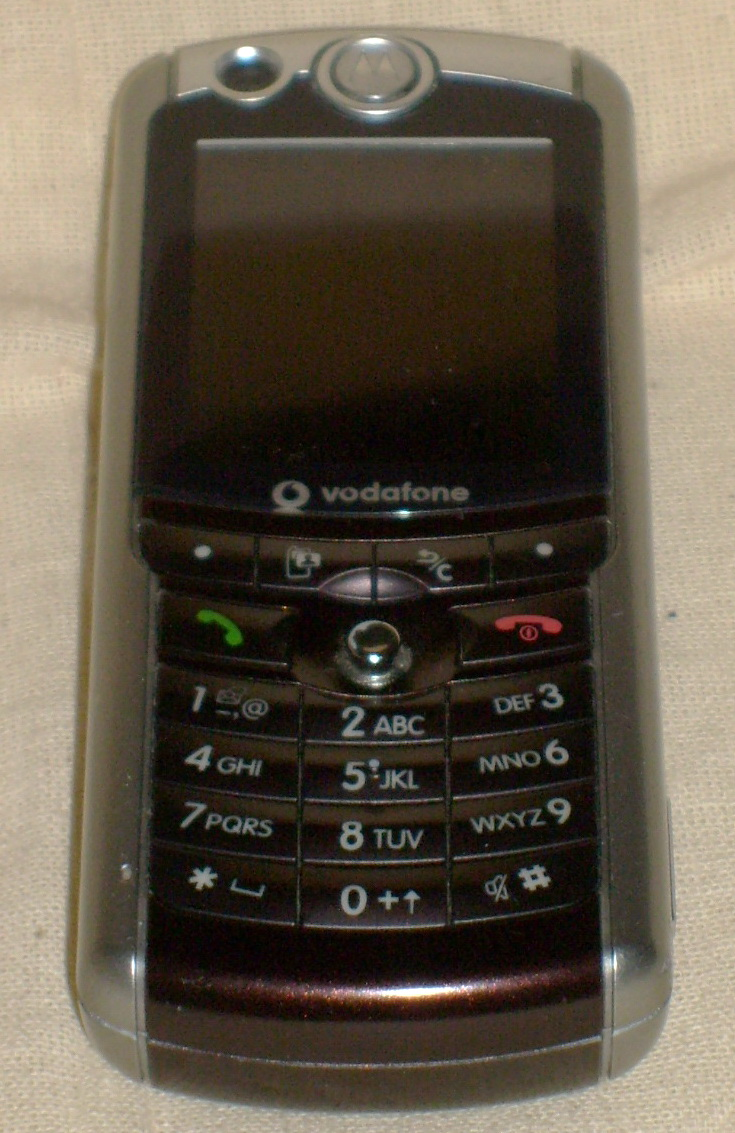
Motorola e770

The Motorola E770 mobile phone (also known as the E770v denoting a Vodafone network specific variant of this handset) is a 3G phone that operates primarily on the third generation phone network; however, it can be downscable to GPRS 2.5 and below if required.

The E770v resembles very much by looks with Motorola's famous E398 model; still, the hardware differences are pretty substantial.

It was announced in 2005, 4th Quarter.

== Performance ==
It weighs 108 grams The Standard Battery has 160 mins talktime and a standby time of 260 hours.

== Features ==
- Built-in antenna
- Built-in handsfree
- UMTS and GSM Triband - 900/1800/1900 MHz
- WAP 2.0 / xHTML Browser
- Data compatible via USB cable or Bluetooth
- Internal Memory - 32 MB
- MicroSD TransFlash External Memory Card up to 1 GB
- Java MIDP 2.0
- SyncML
- Messaging: SMS, MMS, Email, Instant messaging.
- MP3, MP4, WMA music support
- Vibrate alert
- TFT display, 176 x 220 pixels (30 x 38 mm), 65K colors.
- Video capture, playback, download and streaming
- 2 built-in VGA digital cameras:
  - 640x840 video camera.
  - Secondary VGA video call camera
- Video messaging
- Video playback full screen at 176/144 30fps

== Data ==
- GPRS: Class 10 (4+1/3+2 slots), 32 - 48 kbit/s
- HSCSD: No
- EDGE: No
- 3G: Yes, 384 kbit/s.
- WLAN: No
- Bluetooth: v1.2 with A2DP
- Infrared port: No
- USB: miniUSB

== Limitations ==
The phone has been found to have some limitations by its users, including bluetooth file transfer size limitations, non-removable or changeable operator settings such as logos and hotkeys, and music playback limitations (bitrates over 192 kbit/s are not supported).
