= Motorola i1000plus =

Mobile phone

The Motorola i1000plus is a Motorola iDEN series phone. The phone came out in 1999. It is a clamshell phone. The phone featured the direct connect feature (Two way radio). On Nextel, it offered Nextel Net and other Nextel features. The i1000 plus is a digital phone. The phone, on the battery pack section and with the flip closed measures about 1 inch in thickness.
