= Motorola E1000 =

Mobile phone model

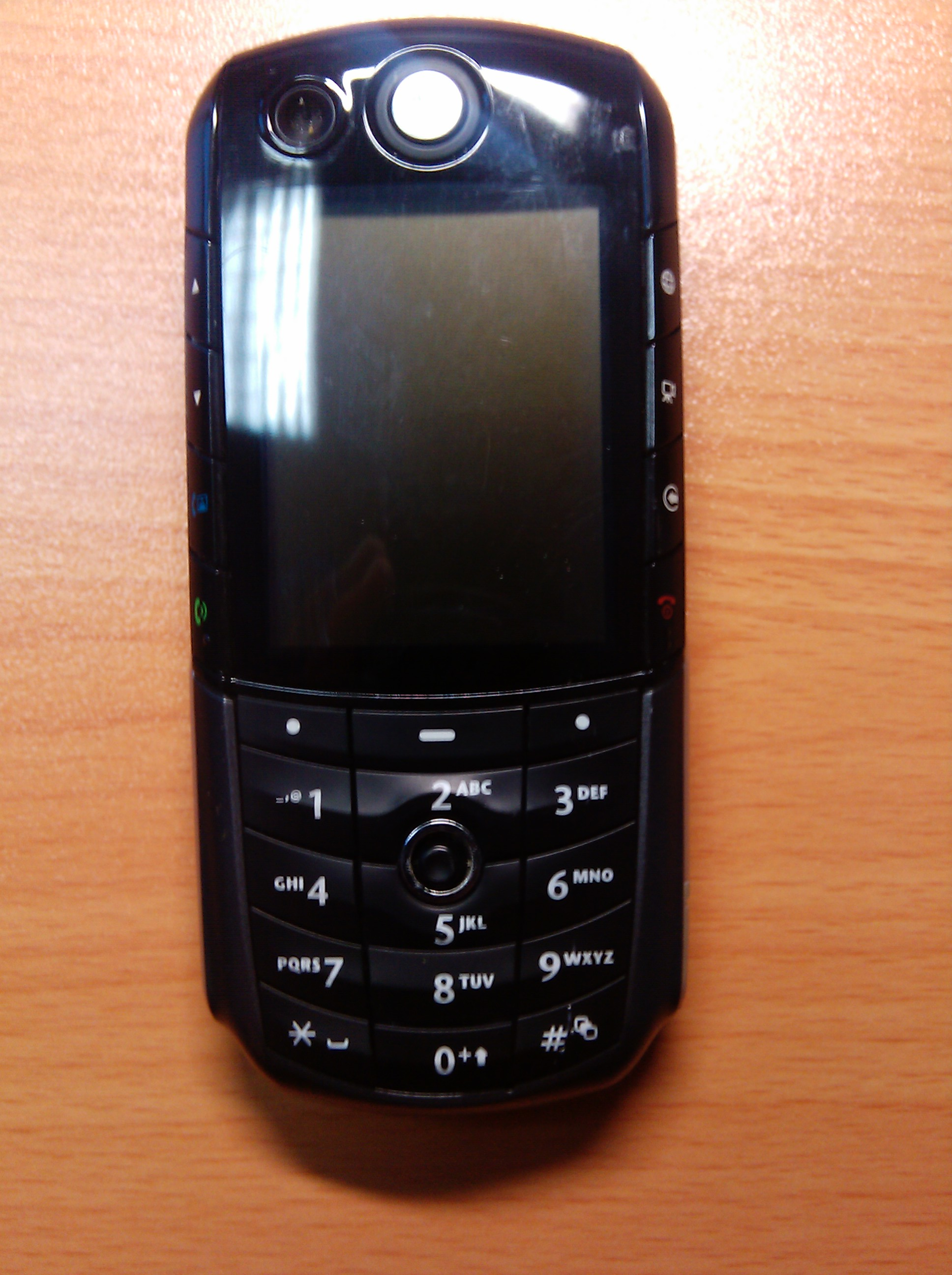
A picture of Motorola E1000

The E1000 is a 3G/GSM candybar style mobile phone developed by Motorola. This product was announced in February 2004. The E1000 was made to replace Motorola's older 3G phones such as the A835 and A845. The E1000 includes an mp3 player and stereo speakers. It is able to record video and taking mega pixel stills. The features list includes assisted global positioning system (AGPS) for location-based services

== Specifications ==
- Technology: WCDMA/UMTS and GSM 900/1800/1900
- Dimensions: 114 x 52 x 23 mm
- Weight: 140 g
- Talk time: Up to 2.5 hours
- Standby time: Up to 150 hours

== Features ==
- Display: 240 x 320 pixel TFT, 262K colors (2.2in diagonally)
- Ringtones: 3D Stereo Speaker Polyphonic (22 channels) and MP3 + WMA support
- 16 MB shared memory, and supports microSD (TransFlash) external memory cards (not hotswappable)
- Connectivity: GPRS Class 10 (4+1/3+2), USB, Bluetooth v1.1
- Messaging: SMS, EMS, MMS, E-Mail, Instant Messaging
- Two-way video calling / video telephony
- Integrated video and audio media player
- CIF internal camera for video calls (0.3MP), 1.2MP external camera - 8x digital zoom, exposure settings and brightness
- Video and still image capture using either camera
- Supports AGPS
- Java MIDP 2.0 Compatible
- WAP 2.0 / XHTML web browser
