= Motorola Q9m =

Mobile Phone

- Manufacturer: Motorola
- Availability by region: November 2007; 18 years ago
- Compatible networks: CDMA
- Dimensions: 4.61 in × 2.56 in × 0.47 in (117 mm × 65 mm × 12 mm)
- Weight: 4.76 oz (135 g)
- Operating system: Windows Mobile 6.0 for Smartphone
- CPU: Intel XScale PXA27x 312 MHz
- Removable storage: MiniSD
- Battery: 1170 mAh LiIon, Talk: 4.5 hours max.(273 minutes), Standby: 212 hours max.(8.8 days)
- Rear camera: 1.3-megapixel
- Display: 16-bit Color 320 x 240 TFT display
- Connectivity: Bluetooth
- Data inputs: Illuminated QWERTY Keypad & Side Thumbwheel, Blue Illumination Sprint, Red Illumination Verizon

The Motorola Q9m is a smartphone that uses Windows Mobile 6.0. This particular phone is for use with Verizon Wireless. It is capable of playing music, videos and photos. It also offers the V CAST service which was not previously available on the Motorola Q9c. It has a full qwerty keyboard and a 1.3-megapixel camera. It is also Bluetooth compatible. It has 64 MB of on board memory and can accept mini SDHC cards. Its display resolution is 320x240 widescreen. It features Office To Go for viewing and editing documents.
