= Motorola Signature 27 =

2026 smartphone model

- Brand: Motorola
- Manufacturer: Lenovo
- Predecessor: Motorola Signature 26
- Compatible networks: GSM, HSPA, LTE
- Colors: Coal Smoke, Capulet Olive
- Dimensions: 162×77×8 mm (6.38×3.03×0.31 in)
- Weight: 227 g (8.01 oz)
- Operating system: Android 17
- System-on-chip: Snapdragon 8 Elite Extreme Gen 6
- CPU: Octa-core (2x5.01 GHz Prime + 3x4.03 GHz Performance + 3x3.74 GHz Performance)
- GPU: Adreno 850
- Memory: 12 GB or 16 GB RAM
- Storage: 256 / 512GB
- Battery: 7,000 mAh Li-Po (non-removable)
- Charging: 90W wired, 50W wireless with 5W reverse wireless and 5W reverse wired
- Rear camera: 50 MP, 200 MP
- Front camera: 50 MP, f/1.9, 22mm (wide), 1/2.75", 0.64µm, PDAF, HDR
- Display: 6.78 inches
- Sound: Stereo speakers (with Dolby Atmos)
- Connectivity: Wi-Fi 802.11 a/b/g/n/ac, dual-band Bluetooth 7.0, A2DP, LE; GPS, GALILEO, GLONASS; USB Type-C 2.0
- Water resistance: Water-repellent design
- Website: https://www.motorola.com/gb/en/p/phones/motorola-signature/signature/pmipmje43mf

The Motorola Signature 27 is a flagship Android smartphone manufactured, designed, and marketed by Motorola Mobility, a subsidiary of Lenovo. It was announced on November 5, 2026.

== History ==
The Motorola Signature 27 was teased on September 22, 2026 at the Qualcomm Tech Summit. Revealing the design for the upcoming phones with specs suggesting a Snapdragon 8 Elite Extreme Gen 6, and that the phone would be released later in 2026, with support for aftermarket operating systems including GrapheneOS.

In October 2026, Motorola confirmed that the Motorola Signature 27 would launch as soon as November, with specs detailed in a video.

The Motorola Signature 27 was announced on November 5, 2026, with a price tag of $1,599. Pre-orders for the US market will start on November 19th.

== Design ==
The Motorola Signature 27 is offered in two colors: Coal Smoke and Capulet Olive.

== Technical specifications ==
==== Display ====
The Motorola Signature 27 uses a 6.8-inch Extreme AMOLED Duo with Gorilla Glass Ceramic 3.

==== Processor and battery ====
The Motorola Signature 27 is powered using a Snapdragon 8 Elite Extreme Gen 6 with a 7,000 mAh battery, with 90W wired charging, and wireless charging.

==== Camera ====
The Motorola Signature 27 uses a triple rear camera setup. The main camera is powered by a 200-megapixel main camera with f/2.6, 66mm, aperture. A 50-megapixel wide camera is also used with a f/1.6, 24mm with support for OIS.

==== Software ====
The Motorola Signature 27 ships with Android 17 with 7 years of OS/security updates, with support ending within 2033.
