= Moto G22 =

Android-based smartphones produced by Lenovo

Motorola Moto G22
- Manufacturer: Lenovo
- Type: Smartphone
- First released: 4 March 2022
- Compatible networks: 4G, 3G, 2G
- Weight: 185 g (7 oz)
- Operating system: Android 12
- System-on-chip: MediaTek Helio G37
- Memory: 4 GB
- Storage: 64GB, 128GB
- Removable storage: yes
- SIM: dual sim
- Battery: 5000mah
- Charging: Type C
- Rear camera: 50 MP, f/1.8, (wide), 0.64 μm, PDAF 8 MP, f/2.2, 118˚ (ultrawide), 1/4.0", 1.12 μm 2 MP, f/2.4, (macro) 2 MP, f/2.4, (depth)
- Front camera: 16 MP, f/2.5, (wide), 1.0 μm
- Display: 720P
- Model: G22

The Motorola Moto G22 is an Android smartphone developed by Motorola Mobility, a subsidiary of Lenovo. It was announced in March 2022, and released later the same month.

== History ==
Motorola announced the Moto G22 on 3 March 2022, a day after details were leaked about it online by German website WinFuture. It was released in the United Kingdom and Europe that same month, and in India on 8 April 2022.

== Design ==
The back panel of the phone is made from plastic with a glossy finish. It weighs 185g and has a thickness of 8.49mm. It comes with a type-C charging Port, 3.5mm audio jack and has a microSD card slot. It has a 6.5-inch LCD with 720p resolution. The average peak brightness of the phone is 500 nits with 90 Hz refresh rate.

== Hardware ==
Moto G22 is powered by the MediaTek Helio G37 and comes with Android 12. The phone features a 50MP primary camera with a f/1.8 aperture. It is supported by an 8MP wide-angle sensor, 2MP macro sensor, and a 2MP depth sensor. The phone has a 5000 mAh battery with 20W charging.
