= Motorola e380 =

Motorola mobile phone

The Motorola E380 is a small phone made by Motorola. It was released in Q3 of 2003. In 2006 Motorola released a Dolly magazine edition in Australia. This phone has been discontinued after the Dolly version.
