= Motorola Jazz =

Pager produced by Motorola

The Motorola Jazz is a pager produced by Motorola between 1991 and 1993 which uses the FLEX pager protocol.

It was available in Slate Gray, Arctic White, Ocean Blue and transparent colors. The Jazz was the smallest messaging pager at the time of its release, ran on a single AAA battery and had a green LCD. The user could also opt for news updates from the service provider.

In 1997 Motorola also released a Memo Jazz version, with a bigger memory and "phone book".

== See also ==
- Motorola MINITOR pager
- Motorola StarTAC
- Motorola DynaTAC
- Motorola MicroTAC
- Pager
