= Motorola One =

Phone series with Android One certification

- Brand: Motorola
- Manufacturer: Motorola Mobility
- Type: Smartphone
- Series: Motorola One
- First released: 2018
- Predecessor: Moto X4
- Removable storage: microSD up to 2 TB
- Connectivity: USB-C, NFC, Bluetooth 5.0 BR/EDR + BLE, Wi-Fi 802.11a/b/g/n/ac, 2.4 GHz + 5 GHz
- Data inputs: Touch screen, fingerprint reader
- Website: Motorola One

Motorola One (stylised as MotorolaOne) is a series of Android phones developed by Motorola Mobility. The Motorola One series, first launched in 2018 as upper mid-range replacements for the Moto X4, was originally a series of phones featuring the Android One version of Android and mostly made available in Asian and European markets. However, the latest Motorola One series phones like Motorola One Zoom does not support Android One.

== Releases ==
=== Motorola One ===
The first release in the series is named the Motorola One, alternatively known as the P30 Play in China. It was released in October 2018 with Android Oreo. It came to the market at a price of 180 Euros, making it a low-end phone.

=== Motorola One Power ===
The second release in this series is named the Motorola One Power, also called the P30 Note in China. It was released in October 2018 and boasted a 5000 mAh battery. It came to the market at a price of 250 Euros, making it a mid-range phone.

=== Motorola One Vision ===
The third release in this series is named the Motorola One Vision. It was released on June 20, 2019 and boasted a 21:9 screen and a 48 MP main sensor, as well as Android Pie. It came to the market at a price of 300 Euros, making it a mid-range phone. This was Motorola's first phone to feature Samsung Exynos processors.

=== Motorola One Action ===
The fourth release in this series is named the Motorola One Action. It was released on October 31, 2019 and was the first phone in the market to record landscape video footage when held in the portrait position enabled by an ultrawide camera. It came to the market at a price of 300 Euros, making it a mid-range phone. Like the Motorola One Vision, it features the Samsung Exynos 9609 chipset. The US version of this phone is not supported by the Android One program.

=== Motorola One Zoom ===
The fifth release in the series is named the Motorola One Zoom. It was released on September 5, 2019 with a quad camera setup including telephoto and ultrawide lenses and a 48 MP main sensor. It came to the market at a price of 400 Euros, making it a mid-range phone and the most expensive in the series.

=== Motorola One Macro ===
The sixth release in the series is named the Motorola One Macro. It was released on October 12, 2019 with a dedicated macro camera. It costs 130 Euros, making it a low-end phone and cheaper than the original device.

=== Motorola One Hyper ===
The seventh release in the series is named the Motorola One Hyper. It was released on December 4, 2019 with a pop-up selfie camera, 45W fast charging, a 64 MP main sensor and Android 10. It costs 360 Euros, making it a mid-range phone and the second most expensive in the series.

=== Motorola One Fusion ===
The eighth release in the series is named the Motorola One Fusion. It was released on July 2, 2020 with a 5000 mAh battery and a 48 MP quad camera setup. It costs 200 Euros, making it a mid-range phone.

=== Motorola One Fusion+ ===
The ninth release in the series is named the Motorola One Fusion+. It was released on June 8, 2020 with a pop-up selfie camera, a 5000 mAh battery and a 64 MP quad camera setup. It costs 300 Euros, making it a mid-range phone.

== Specifications ==
Comparison of different models of Motorola One
Model Name	Motorola One (P30 Play)	Motorola One Power (P30 Note)	Motorola One Vision	Motorola One Action	Motorola One Zoom	Motorola One Macro	Motorola One Hyper	Motorola One Fusion	Motorola One Fusion+	Motorola One 5G Ace
Codename										
Model Number	XT1941	XT1942	XT1970	XT2013	XT2010	XT2016	XT2027	XT2073	XT2067	XT2113
Released	October 2018	October 2018	June 2019	October 2019	September 2019	October 2019	December 2019	July 2020	June 2020	February 2021
Build Material	Front and Back: Gorilla Glass (unspecified version) Frame: Plastic	Front: Corning Gorilla Glass (unspecified version)	Front and Back: Gorilla Glass 3 Frame: Poly-carbonate	Front: Gorilla Glass 3 Back: Glasstic material Frame: Poly-carbonate	Front: Panda King Glass Back: Gorilla Glass 3 Frame: Aluminum	Front: Gorilla Glass 3 Back: Glasstic material Frame: Poly-carbonate	Plastic body, front glass	Front: Corning Gorilla Glass (unspecified version) Frame and Back: Plastic	Front: Corning Gorilla Glass (unspecified version) Frame and Back: Plastic	Body: plastic
Weight	162 g (5.71 oz)	205 g (6.98 oz)	180 g (6.35 oz)	176 g (6.21 oz)	190 g (6.70 oz)	186 g (6.56 oz)	210 g (7.41 oz)	202 g (7.13 oz)	210 g (7.41 oz)	212 g (7.48 oz)
SIMs	Single/Dual Nano-SIM Dual stand-by	Single SIM (Nano-SIM) or Hybrid Dual SIM (Nano-SIM, dual stand-by)	Single/Dual Nano-SIM Dual stand-by	Single/Dual Nano-SIM Dual stand-by	Single/Dual Nano-SIM Dual stand-by	Single/Dual Nano-SIM Dual stand-by	Single SIM (Nano-SIM) or Hybrid Dual SIM (Nano-SIM, dual stand-by)	Single SIM (Nano-SIM) or Hybrid Dual SIM (Nano-SIM, dual stand-by)	Single SIM (Nano-SIM) or Hybrid Dual SIM (Nano-SIM, dual stand-by)	1 Nano SIM + 1 microSD
Display Size (inches)	5.9	6.2	6.3	6.3	6.4	6.2	6.5	6.5	6.5	6.7
Display Resolution	720 x 1520 (9:19)	1080 x 2246 (9:18.7)	1080 x 2520 (9:21)	1080 x 2520 (9:21)	1080 x 2340 (9:19.5)	720 x 1520 (9:19)	1080 x 2340 (9:19.5)	720 x 1600 (9:20)	1080 x 2340 (9:19.5)	1080 x 2400 (9:20)
Display Technology	LTPS IPS LCD	LTPS IPS LCD	LTPS IPS LCD	LTPS IPS LCD	Super AMOLED	IPS LCD	IPS LCD	IPS LCD	IPS LCD	LTPS IPS LCD, HDR10
Display Notch / Cutout	Wide Notch	Wide Notch	Pinhole	Pinhole	Small Notch	Small Notch	None	Small Notch	None	Small cutout
Operating System (shipped)	Android 8.1 Oreo	Android 8.1 Oreo	Android 9 Pie	Android 9 Pie	Android 9 Pie	Android 9 Pie	Android 10	Android 10	Android 10	Android 10
Operating System (end of life)	Android 10	Android 10	Android 11	Android 11	Android 10	Android 10	Android 11	Android 11	Android 11	Android 11
CPU	Snapdragon 625, Octa-core 2.0GHz Cortex-A53	Snapdragon 636, Octa-core (4x1.8 GHz Kryo 260 Gold & 4x1.6 GHz Kryo 260 Silver)	Exynos 9609, Quad 2.2GHz Cortex-A72 & Quad 1.6GHz Cortex-A53		Snapdragon 675, Dual 2.0GHz Kryo 460 Gold & Hexa 1.7GHz Kryo 460 Silver	MediaTek Helio P70, Quad 2.1GHz Cortex-A73 & Quad 2.0GHz Cortex-A53	Snapdragon 675, Dual 2.0GHz Kryo 460 Gold & Hexa 1.7GHz Kryo 460 Silver	Snapdragon 710, Dual 2.2GHz Kryo 360 Gold & Hexa 1.7GHz Kryo 360 Silver	Snapdragon 730(G), Dual 2.2GHz Kryo 470 Gold & Hexa 1.8GHz Kryo 470 Silver	Qualcomm SM7225 Snapdragon 750G 5G, Octa-core (2x2.2 GHz Kryo 570 & 6x1.8 GHz Kryo 570)
GPU	Adreno 506 @650 MHz	Adreno 509	Mali-G72 MP3		Adreno 612	Mali-G72 MP3 @900 MHz	Adreno 612	Adreno 616	Adreno 618	Adreno 619
RAM	3 GB, 4 GB LPDDR3	3 GB, 4 GB, 6 GB	4 GB LPDDR4X	4 GB LPDDR4X	4 GB LPDDR4X	4 GB LPDDR4X	4 GB LPDDR4X	4 GB	6 GB	6 GB
Storage	32 GB, 64 GB	32 GB, 64 GB	128 GB	128 GB	128 GB	64 GB	128 GB	64 GB	128 GB	64 GB or 128 GB
SD card support	MicroSD up to 256 GB	MicroSD up to 256 GB	MicroSD up to 1 TB	MicroSD up to 512 GB	MicroSD up to 512 GB	MicroSD up to 512 GB	MicroSD up to 1 TB	MicroSD up to 1 TB	MicroSD up to 1 TB	MicroSD up to 1 TB
Back Camera Array	13 MP main sensor 2 MP depth sensor	16 MP, f/1.8, 1.12 μm, PDAF 5 MP, f/2.2, 1.0 μm, depth sensor	Wide 48 MP main sensor 5MP depth sensor	Wide 12 MP main sensor (portrait) Ultrawide 16 MP main sensor (landscape) 5 MP depth sensor	Samsung S5KGM1SP 0.8 um 48 MP main sensor (wide) Omnivision OV16885 16 MP main sensor (ultrawide) Omnivision OV08A10 8 MP main sensor (telephoto) Samsung S5K5E9 5 MP depth sensor	13 MP main sensor 2 MP macro sensor 2 MP depth sensor	Wide 64 MP main sensor, f/1.8, 1/1.7", 0.8 μm, PDAF Ultrawide 8 MP sensor, 13 mm	48 MP main sensor (wide), f/1.7, 1/2", 0.8 μm, PDAF 8 MP sensor (ultrawide) 5 MP sensor (macro) 2 MP sensor (depth)	64 MP main sensor (wide), f/1.8, 1/1.7", 0.8 μm, PDAF 8 MP sensor (ultrawide) 5 MP sensor (macro) 2 MP sensor (depth)	48MP (f/1.7, 0.8um), output 12MP (f/1.7, 1.6um) 8 MP, f/2.2, 118˚ (ultrawide), 1.12 μm 2 MP, f/2.4, (macro), AF Quad Pixel | PDAF
Back Camera Video Resolution	4k @ 30 FPS, 1080P @ 30/60 FPS	4K @ 30 FPS, 1080p @ 30/60 FPS	4K @ 30 FPS, 1080P @ 30/60 FPS	4K @ 30 FPS, 1080P @ 30/60 FPS	4K @ 30 FPS, 1080P @ 30/60 FPS	1080P @ 30/60/120 FPS	4K @ 30 FPS	4K @ 30 FPS, 1080P @ 30 FPS	4K @ 30 FPS, 1080P @ 30/60 FPS	4k @ 30 FPS 1080P @ 60/30 FPS gyro-EIS
Back Camera Flash	LED	Dual-LED	Dual LED	Dual LED	Dual LED	LED	LED	LED	LED	LED
Front Camera Array	8 MP	12 MP	25 MP	12 MP	Samsung S5K2X5 (25 MP)	8 MP	32 MP pop-up	8 MP	16 MP pop-up	16MP (f/2.2, 1um) Quad Pixel
Front Camera Video Resolution	1080P @ 30 FPS	1080p @ 30 FPS	1080P @ 30 FPS	1080P @ 30 FPS	1080P @ 30 FPS	1080P @ 30 FPS	1080P @ 30 FPS	1080P @ 30 FPS	1080P @ 30 FPS	FHD @ 30fps
Front Camera Flash	LED	LED	Screen Flash	Screen Flash	Screen Flash	Screen Flash	Screen Flash	Screen Flash	Screen Flash	
3.5mm Headphone Jack	Yes	Yes	Yes	Yes	Yes	Yes	Yes	Yes	Yes	Yes
WiFi	802.11 a/b/g/n	802.11 a/b/g/n/ac	802.11 a/b/g/n/ac	802.11 a/b/g/n/ac	802.11 a/b/g/n/ac	802.11 b/g/n	802.11 a/b/g/n/ac	802.11 a/b/g/n/ac	802.11 a/b/g/n/ac	802.11a/b/g/n/ac
Bluetooth	4.2	5.0	5.0	5.0	5.0	4.2	5.0	5.0	5.0	5.1
NFC	Yes (except NA model)	Yes (except NA model)	Yes (except NA model)	Yes (except NA model)	Yes	No	Yes (except NA model)	No	No	Yes
USB	USB 2.0 / Type-C 1.0	USB 2.0 / Type-C 1.0	USB 2.0 / Type-C 1.0	USB 2.0 / Type-C 1.0	USB 3.1 / Type-C 1.0	USB 2.0 / Type-C 1.0	USB 2.0 / Type-C 1.0	USB 2.0 / Type-C 1.0	USB 2.0 / Type-C 1.0	USB 2.0 / Type-C
Wired Charging	(up to) 15W	(up to) 15W	(up to) 15W	(up to) 10W	(up to) 15W	(up to) 10W	(up to) 45W		(up to) 18W	(up to) 15W
Battery	Non-removable 3000mAh	Non-removable 5000mAh	Non-removable 3500mAh	Non-removable 3500mAh	Non-removable 4000mAh	Non-removable 4000mAh	Non-removable 4000mAh	Non-removable 5000mAh	Non-removable 5000mAh	Non-removable 5000mAh
Fingerprint Reader	Rear	Rear	Rear	Rear	Under screen	Rear	Rear	Rear	Rear	Rear
Ingress Protection	„P2i“ splashproof nanocoating without IP-cert		IP 52	IP 52	„P2i“ splashproof nanocoating without IP-cert	IP 52	"Water-repellent"			IP52
Colours	Black White	Midnight Black	Bronze Gradient Sapphire Gradient	Denim Blue Pearl White (Limited Edition) Aqua Teal	Electric Gray Cosmic Purple Brushed Bronze	Space Blue Cosmic Purple	Fresh Orchid Deepsea Blue Dark Amber	Emerald Green Deep Sapphire Blue	Moonlight White Twilight Blue	Volcanic Gray Frosted Silver
