= Motorola A910 =

Mobile phone

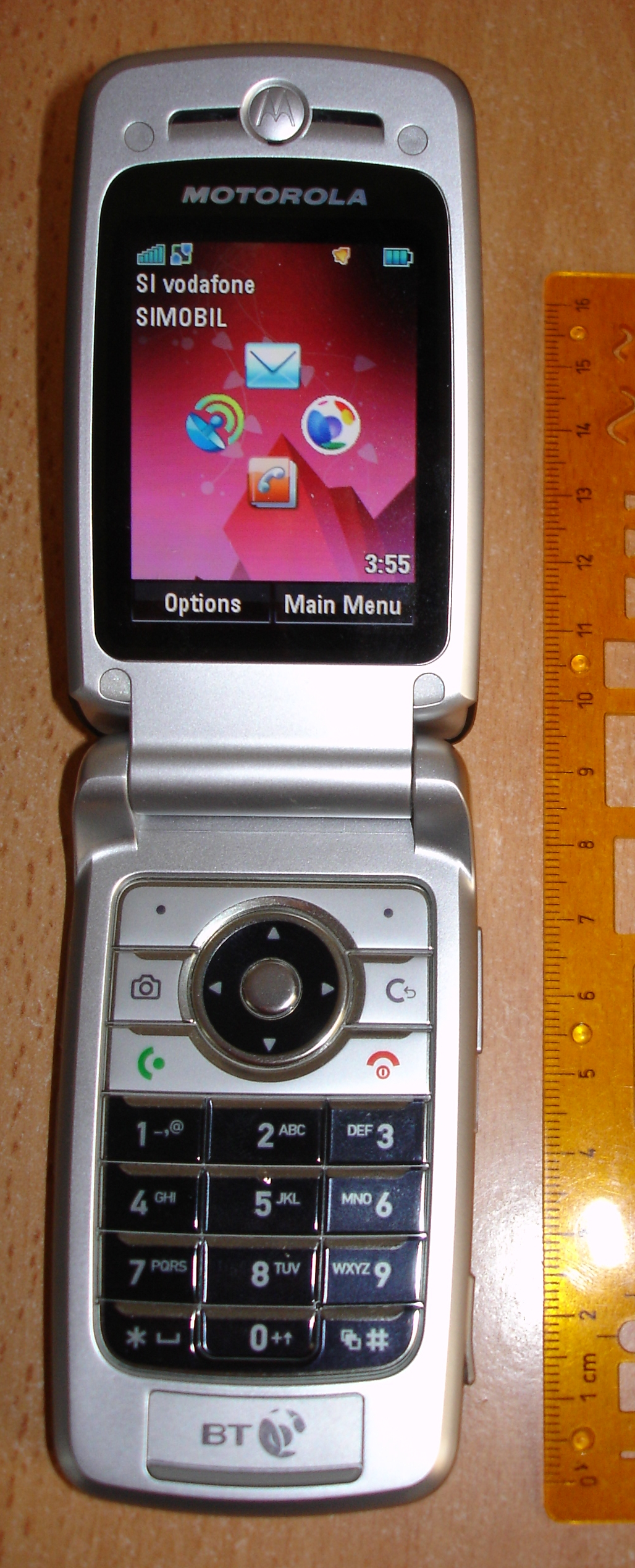
- Motorola A910 opened
- Manufacturer: Motorola
- Availability by region: Q1 2006
- Compatible networks: GSM Tri-band (900/1800/1900)
- Dimensions: 93×51×23 mm (3.66×2.01×0.91 in), 88 cc
- Weight: 127 g (4 oz)
- Operating system: MontaVista Linux OS (not MOTOMAGX)
- CPU: Intel XScale processor
- Memory: 48MB RAM
- Removable storage: SD/MMC expandable to 2 GB
- Battery: Li-ion 1000 mAh
- Rear camera: 1.3 megapixels 1280 x 1024 pixels, with full-screen viewfinder
- Display: 240 x 320 pixels, TFT with 256k colors
- Media: AMR-NB, AMR-WB, XMF, WMA v9, WAV, AAC, EAAC+, MP3, RealAudio, MP4
- Connectivity: GPRS Class 10, Enhanced Mini USB, BCM2045 Bluetooth 2.0 (+A2DP), Wi-Fi 802.11 b/g
- Data inputs: Dialpad keyboard

The Motorola A910 is a clamshell mobile phone from Motorola, which uses MontaVista Linux as the operating system.

Motorola started selling this phone in the first quarter of the year 2006. Utilizing a balanced Linux-Java operating system and Wi-Fi connectivity, the Motorola A910 surpassed its predecessors with user-friendly features. It is also the only clamshell phone from Motorola with Wi-Fi, as well as the only non-touchscreen Motorola with Wi-Fi in Europe.

== Features ==
The phone is supplied with a number of applications including a POP and IMAP email client, Opera web browser, calendar and a viewer for PDF and Microsoft Office files. Calendar and address book can be synchronized with a Microsoft Exchange or SyncML server. The phone has a 1.3 megapixel camera with Self Portrait Viewfinder External Display and photo lighting, recording still and video images. RealPlayer is included to play sound audio files and streamed audio and video. The phone has 48 megabytes of internal flash memory for storing user data and a slot for a microSD card, which supports additional 2 GB of storage. Both Bluetooth and USB are provided for communication with another computer. Character entry is made by the keypad interface.

== Linux enthusiasts ==
This phone is popular with Linux enthusiasts. It is able to establish an Ethernet connection between the phone and another computer over USB, Bluetooth or Wi-Fi. One can then telnet to the phone and be presented with a bash prompt. From the prompt one can, for example, mount a NFS drive(s) on the phone. The underlying operating system, Motorola EZX is Linux based, its kernel is open source. With the source code hosted on opensource.motorola.com, it is possible to recompile and replace the kernel for this operating system. However Motorola did not publish a software development kit for native applications. Instead, they expect third-party programs to be written in Java ME. The OpenEZX website is dedicated to providing free opensource software for this phone and others using the same OS.

== See also ==
- Motorola
- List of Motorola products
- List of mobile phones running Linux
- OpenEZX
