= Southern Linc =

Southern Communications Services, Inc.
- Formerly: SouthernLINC Wireless
- Type: Subsidiary
- Industry: Wireless Services
- Founded: 1996; 30 years ago
- Headquarters: Atlanta, Georgia, U.S.
- Products: LTE, Two way messaging, Push to Talk
- Parent: Southern Company
- Website: southernlinc.com

Southern Communications Services, Inc. (d/b/a as Southern Linc, and formerly as SouthernLINC Wireless) is a regional LTE carrier providing coverage in areas of the southeast United States including Mississippi, Alabama, and Georgia.

The company has been recognized for its robust performance during severe weather including Hurricane Katrina, wherein SouthernLINC had recovered to 100% system availability within 72 hours of landfall.

== History ==
Roy Barron, long time Southern Company veteran, was the company's first president. His team including long time Southern Company veteran Danny Moore as CFO, Harold Gwinn from Alabama Power as VP of Engineering, and Jeffrey Brooks, previously with Vanguard Cellular Systems, as SVP Sales Marketing and Service. Southern Communications had its corporate headquarters in Atlanta, while billing and switching facilities were concentrated in Birmingham.

Southern Linc started as Motorola iDEN network with a broad dealer base. In 2015, Southern Linc began construction of a new 4G LTE network, which was expected initially to become operational in mid-2016 in Birmingham, Atlanta and Tuscaloosa. The iDEN network was retired in March 2019, increasing LTE bandwidth to 3MHz, from 1.4MHz during the transition.

In 2025, Southern Linc partnered with OneLayer to enhance the management and security of its private CriticalLinc LTE network.
