= Evan Blass =

American writer, editor, and former phone leaker

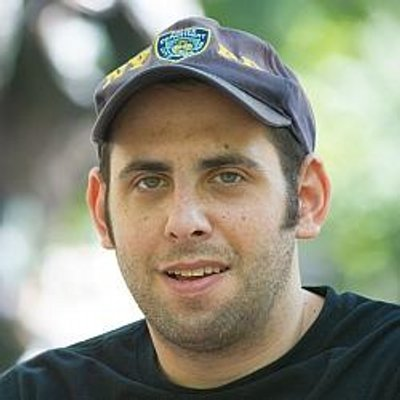
- Evan Blass
- Born: 1978 (age 47–48)
- Occupations: Blogger, Editor, Phone leaker
- Known for: @evleaks

Evan Blass, once known solely by his pen name @evleaks, is an American blogger, editor, and phone leaker. He gained international notoriety for a series of numerous smartphone and tablet leaks on Twitter, spanning the period July 2012 through August 2014, that made him a trusted source for many technology journalists. Blass announced his retirement from leaking devices in a tweet on August 3, 2014, although he soon returned to leaking under his pen name.

Evan Blass is a native of Allentown, Pennsylvania, and is a graduate of Vassar College.

== Career ==
From 2005–2008, Blass held several positions at AOL-owned technology site Engadget, including senior editor, before departing to write briefly for the now defunct technology publication Obsessable. From 2010–2012, Blass was managing editor of mobile technology site Pocketnow.

Blass was diagnosed with multiple sclerosis in 2004, and in November 2013 was the subject of a report on The Verge documenting a controversial Walgreens policy pertaining to the dispensation of narcotic painkillers.

On November 23, 2015, Blass started writing for VentureBeat.

== @evleaks Twitter account ==
The account was started in July 2012 or August 2012 and retired and deactivated early May 2026.

For nearly a year, Blass maintained the @evleaks account anonymously —while some of his colleagues knew of his identity, he purposely kept it hidden from the public at large. In June 2013, Blass fully revealed himself in an interview with Android Police, citing the inevitability of being unmasked as the reason for his decision.

As @evleaks, Blass was responsible for posting images and information pertaining to unannounced smartphones, tablets, accessories, applications, laptops, and a webOS-powered TV, collectively leaked from nearly every mobile device maker and US wireless carrier, often weeks or even months before their launches. He was particularly adept at obtaining information and pictures about Taiwanese manufacturer HTC Corporation and one-time Finnish handset maker Nokia, reporting on numerous devices those two companies planned during his two-year stint of activity. Additionally, he leaked materials about the Moto X (1st generation), Moto E (1st generation), Droid Ultra, Droid Maxx, and Droid Mini from Motorola; the Nexus 4, Nexus 5, G2, and G3 from LG; the Xperia Z, Z1S, Z2 tablet, and Z3 from Sony; and the first two Padfones and Padfone mini from Asus.

From May 2014 until his retirement, Blass attempted to monetize his leaks by publishing them on his own website, evleaks.at, deriving revenue through advertising sales. Immediately following his retirement announcement, however, Blass conducted an interview with The Next Web in which he recounted the problems he faced in trying to monetize a stream of Twitter leaks. Dozens of publications covered Blass's retirement, most notably the weekly BBC technology show Click and an accompanying BBC Online feature.

Following his self-professed retirement, Blass has continued to leak phones, including the Moto X (2014) (at the time assumed to be called the "Moto X+1"), Nexus 6, and Droid Turbo, all from Motorola. He later also leaked the LG G Pad X, Microsoft Lumia 735 and Samsung Galaxy S6 Active.

Wired magazine included Blass in its 2013 "101 Signals" list of "the best reporters, writers, and thinkers on the Internet." The Times of India profiled Blass (as @evleaks) in its May 11, 2013 edition.

In early 2016, Blass continued to leak accurate details of then-unreleased flagship smartphones Samsung Galaxy S7, Galaxy S7 Edge, LG G5, HTC 10 and Huawei P9 through tweets and VentureBeat articles. He continued to leak throughout the rest of the year, 2017 and 2018.
