= Sensor hub =

Digital signal processor

A sensor hub is a microcontroller unit/coprocessor/DSP set that helps to integrate data from different sensors and process them. This technology can help off-load these jobs from a product's main central processing unit, thus saving battery consumption and providing a performance improvement.

Intel has the Intel Integrated Sensor Hub. Starting from Cherrytrail and Haswell, many Intel processors offer on package sensor hub. The Samsung Galaxy Note II is the first smart phone with a sensor hub, which was launched in 2012.

== Examples ==
Some devices with Snapdragon 800 series chips, including HTC One (M8), Sony Xperia Z1, LG G2, etc., have a sensor hub, the Qualcomm Snapdragon Sensor Core, and all HiSilicon Kirin 920 devices have sensor hub embedded in the chipset with its successor Kirin 925 integrated an i3 chip with same function into it. Some other devices that are not using these chips but with a sensor hub integrated are listed below:

| Brands | Product | Chips |
|---|---|---|
| Apple | Apple iPhone 5s | Apple M7 co-processor with Apple A7 SoC (NXP LPC18A1) |
| Apple | Apple iPad Air | Apple M7 co-processor with Apple A7 SoC (NXP LPC18A1) |
| Apple | iPad Mini (2nd generation) | Apple M7 co-processor with Apple A7 SoC (NXP LPC18A1) |
| Apple | Apple iPhone 6 / 6 Plus | Apple M8 on Apple A8 SoC |
| Apple | iPad Air 2 | Apple M8 on Apple A8X SoC |
| Apple | Apple iPhone 6s / 6s Plus | Apple M9 on Apple A9 SoC |
| Apple | iPad Pro | Apple M9 on Apple A9X SoC |
| Apple | Apple iPhone 7 / 7 Plus | Apple M10 on Apple A10 Fusion SoC |
| Apple | Apple Watch | Apple S1 SiP |
| Apple | Apple Watch Series 2 | Apple S2 SiP |
| Google | Nexus 6P | Android Sensor Hub |
| Google | Nexus 5X | Android Sensor Hub |
| Google | Pixel | CHRE V2 with GPS/Wi-Fi/BT |
| Google | Pixel XL | CHRE V2 with GPS/Wi-Fi/BT |
| Meizu | Meizu MX3 | Atmel AVR UC3L microcontroller |
| Microsoft | Microsoft Surface | Atmel's sensor hub |
| Motorola | Motorola Droid Ultra | Motorola X8 Mobile Computing System including TI MSP430 and TI C55x |
| Motorola | Motorola Droid Maxx | Motorola X8 Mobile Computing System including TI MSP430 and TI C55x |
| Motorola | Motorola Droid Mini | Motorola X8 Mobile Computing System including TI MSP430 and TI C55x |
| Motorola | Motorola Moto X | Motorola X8 Mobile Computing System including TI MSP430 and TI C55x |
| Motorola | Motorola Moto E 2nd Gen | Motorola X8 Mobile Computing System including TI MSP430 and TI C55x |
| Motorola | Motorola Moto G 3rd Gen | Motorola X8 Mobile Computing System including TI MSP430 and TI C55x |
| OnePlus | OnePlus 5 | |
| OnePlus | OnePlus 5T | |
| Samsung | Samsung Galaxy Note2 | Atmel AVR UC3L microcontroller |
| Samsung | Samsung Galaxy S4 | Atmel AVR microcontroller-based sensor hub solution |
