= Droid Turbo =

Android smartphone developed by Motorola Mobility

Motorola Droid Turbo (XT1254)
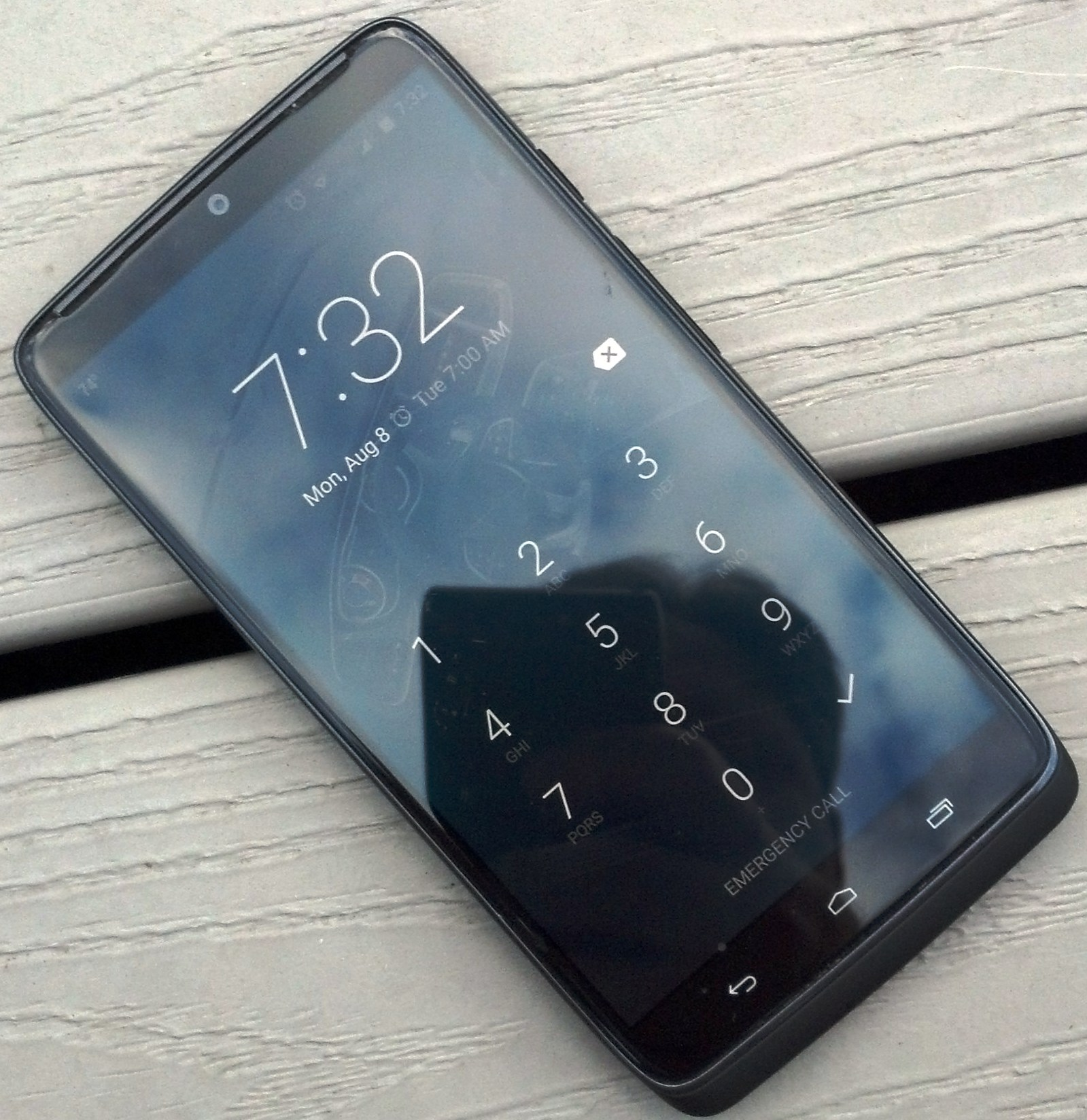
- Brand: Droid
- Manufacturer: Motorola Mobility
- Type: Smartphone
- Series: Droid
- First released: October 30, 2014; 11 years ago
- Availability by region: United States October 30, 2014 (Verizon)
- Predecessor: Droid Maxx
- Successor: Droid Turbo 2
- Related: Moto X (2nd generation)
- Compatible networks: List: CDMA EV-DO rev A; 800, 1900MHz; GSM/GPRS/EDGE 850, 900, 1800, 1900 MHz; UMTS/HSPA 850, 900, 1900, 2100 MHz; LTE 700 MHz Band 13/1700 MHz Band 4; HSDPA+ (4G) 42.2 Mbit/s; HSUPA 5.76 Mbit/s
- Form factor: Slate
- Dimensions: 143.5 mm (5.65 in) H 73.3 mm (2.89 in) W 8.3–11.2 mm (0.33–0.44 in)
- Weight: 176 g (6.2 oz)
- Operating system: Android 4.4.4 (KitKat), Upgradable to Android 6.0.1 (Marshmallow), unofficial upgrade to Android 11
- System-on-chip: Qualcomm Snapdragon 805
- CPU: 2.7 GHz quad-core
- GPU: 600 MHz Adreno 420
- Memory: 3 GiB dual-channel, 800 MHz LPDDR3 RAM
- Storage: 32 GiB internal flash memory 64 GiB internal flash memory
- Removable storage: None
- Battery: 3,900 mAh
- Rear camera: 21 MP (5248×3936 px) 15.5 MP (2952×5248 px in widescreen mode to fit screen aspect ratio) 4K video recording (24 fps); 1080p (30 fps); 720p (slow motion)
- Front camera: 2 MP also ultra HD rear camera (2160)
- Display: 5.2 in (130 mm) diagonal 16:9 aspect ratio widescreen AMOLED RGB capacitive, multi-touch touchscreen 1440x2560 pixel Quad HD (565 PPI) 16 M colors Corning Gorilla Glass 3
- Sound: Speaker, 3.5mm stereo audio jack
- Media: H.263, H.264, MPEG4, RV v10, RV v9, WMV v10, WMV v9
- Connectivity: List: 3.5 mm stereo audio jack; USB 2.0 Host micro USB; Wi-Fi 802.11a/b/g/n/ac (2.4,5 GHz); 4.0 EDR; 4G Wi-Fi hotspot; aGPS (assisted); sGPS (simultaneous); NFC; GLONASS
- Data inputs: Micro USB 2.0
- Other: Use time: up to 48 hours Standby time: up to 20 days Damage resistance: Corning Gorilla Glass 3 screen, Ballistic nylon backing, water-repellent nanocoating Media sharing: Miracast wireless video playback Qi Wireless Charging

The Droid Turbo is a high-end smartphone developed by Motorola Mobility. It is part of the Verizon Droid line, and was announced on October 28, 2014, on the Verizon Droid Does website. The Droid Turbo maintains a similar design shape to its predecessor, the Droid Maxx, with new durable ballistic nylon or metallized glass fiber reinforced with Kevlar as the materials offered. The on-screen buttons for back, home, and multitask functions were kept off-screen as capacitive soft-keys below the display. Due to Lenovo closing its acquisition of Motorola Mobility from Google, the Droid Turbo was the first phone released by Motorola Mobility under Lenovo ownership, as it was released through Verizon Wireless first on the same day the Lenovo sale closed, October 30, 2014.

== Specifications ==
=== Hardware ===
The Droid Turbo came with a Snapdragon 805 quad-core processor clocked at 2.7 GHz, an Adreno 420 GPU, natural language processor for the phone's contextual features, and was backed by a 3,900 mAh battery. The Droid Turbo also has a 5.2-inch Quad HD display with a 565 pixels per inch pixel density at a 1440×2560 resolution.

=== Software ===
The Droid Turbo shipped with Android 4.4.4 KitKat. The Turbo also came with Motorola Mobility's Moto app, which includes features such as Moto Voice, Moto Display, Moto Actions, and Moto Assist.

The device's operating system's first upgrade was to Android Lollipop, Android 5. Its last official upgrade was to Android Marshmallow, Android 6.0.1 and Motorola Mobility has confirmed that they have officially dropped support for the device and that the Droid Turbo would not receive the Android Nougat update.

Enthusiasts from XDA Developers, eventually released unofficial updates to newer Android versions up to Android 11.

=== Storage ===
The Droid Turbo features 32 GB of internal flash memory with the Kevlar version and 32 GB or 64 GB of internal flash memory with Ballistic nylon version. Both versions did not provide expandable memory via a MicroSDXC card slot.

== International version ==
An international (GSM) version was announced in early November 2014, to be branded as "Moto Maxx", initially available only in Brazil, Puerto Rico and Mexico and released in Chile by early 2015. Motorola Mobility released the smartphone in India by the name of the Moto Turbo earlier in 2015.
