= Droid Mini =

Android smartphone developed by Motorola Mobility

Motorola Droid Mini (XT1030)

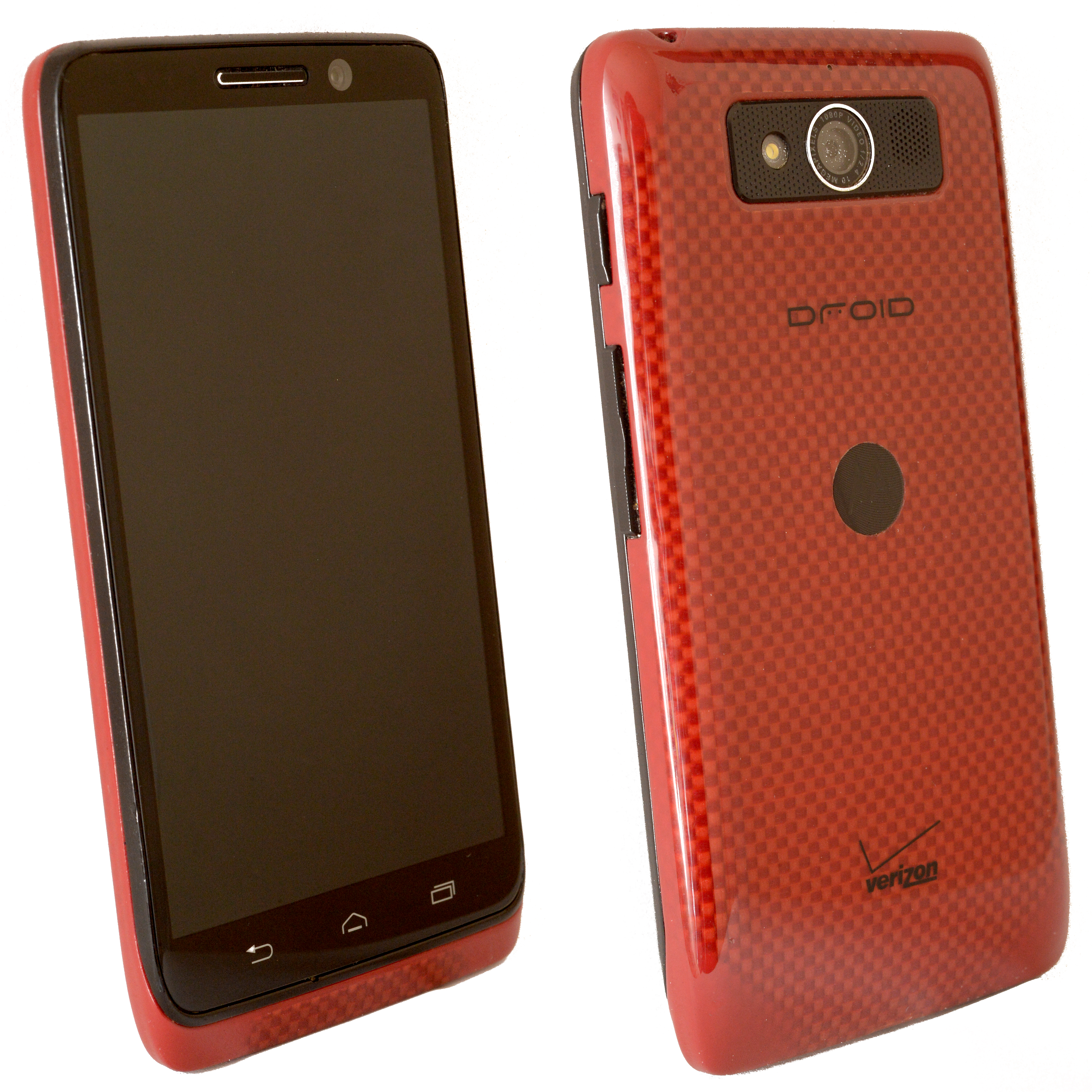
- Motorola Droid Mini XT1030 in red
- Brand: Droid
- Manufacturer: Motorola Mobility
- Type: Smartphone
- Series: Motorola Razr; Droid
- First released: 23 July 2013
- Availability by region: United States August 29, 2013 (Verizon)
- Predecessor: Droid Razr M
- Successor: Moto E (1st generation); Moto G (2nd generation)
- Related: Droid Maxx/Ultra
- Compatible networks: List: CDMA EV-DO rev A bands 800/1900 MHz; GSM/GPRS/EDGE bands 850/900/1800/1900 MHz; UMTS bands 850/900/1900/2100 MHz; LTE bands 700/1700 MHz (B13/B4)
- Form factor: Slate
- Dimensions: 121.3 mm (4.78 in) H 61.3 mm (2.41 in) W 8.9 mm (0.35 in) D
- Weight: 130 g (4.6 oz)
- Operating system: Original: Android 4.2.2 "Jelly Bean"; Current: Android 4.4.2 "KitKat"
- System-on-chip: Motorola X8 Mobile Computing System
- CPU: 1.7 GHz dual-core Qualcomm 8960 Pro
- GPU: 400 MHz quad-core Adreno 320
- Memory: 2GB Dual-channel, 500 MHz LPDDR2 RAM
- Storage: 16 GB internal flash memory
- Removable storage: None
- Battery: 2,000 mAh
- Rear camera: 10 MP 1080p video recording (1920×1080, 30 fps) Slomo 1280×720 at 60fps
- Front camera: 2 MP
- Display: 4.3 in (110 mm) diagonal 16:9 aspect ratio widescreen LCD capacitive, multi-touch touchscreen 1280x720 pixels (342 ppi) 16 M colors
- Sound: Speaker, 3.5 mm stereo audio jack
- Connectivity: List: 3.5 mm stereo audio jack; USB 2.0 Host micro USB; Wi-Fi 802.11a/b/g/n/ac (2.4,5 GHz); 4.0 EDR; 4GWi-Fi hotspot; aGPS (assisted); sGPS (simultaneous); NFC; GLONASS
- SAR: Head 1.02 W/kg; Body-worn 0.53 W/kg
- Hearing aid compatibility: M4, T4

The Droid Mini is an Android-based, 4G LTE-capable smartphone designed by Motorola as the successor to the Droid Razr M. It is a smaller version of the Droid Ultra. It uses an LCD instead of the AMOLED display that the Droid Maxx and Droid Ultra use. However, it maintains the same features, chipset, CPU and GPU.

== History ==
The Droid Mini was announced on 23 July 2013 at a joint Motorola and Verizon Wireless press conference.

== Features ==
Notable changes from its predecessor include multiple hardware refreshes including CPU, GPU, RAM, display resolution and camera. Software features exclusive to Motorola branded smartphones are also included.
