= Moto G (1st generation) =

Android smartphone developed by Motorola Mobility

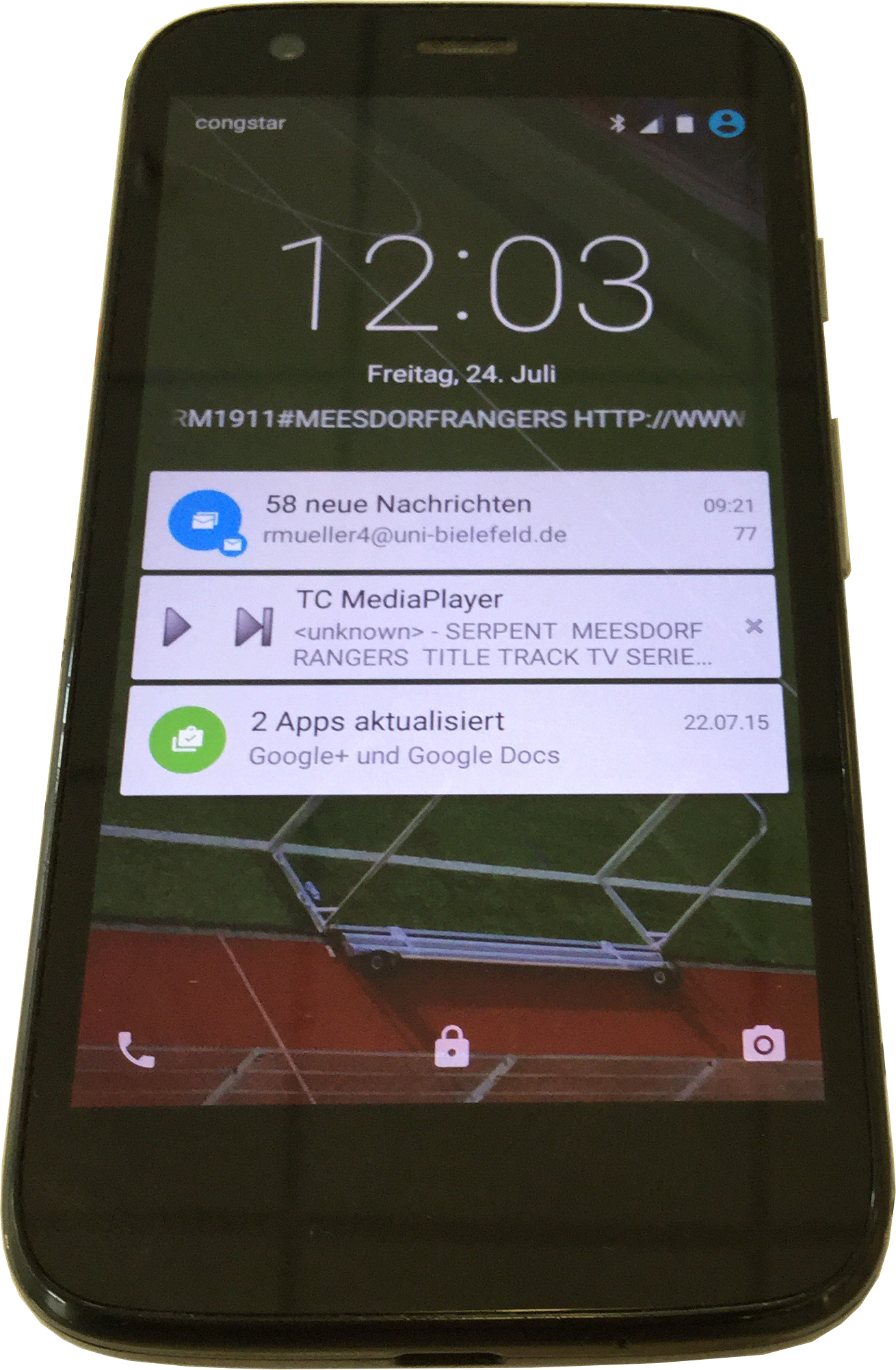
- Manufacturer: Motorola Mobility
- Type: Smartphone
- Series: Moto
- First released: November 13, 2013
- Successor: Moto G (2nd generation)
- Related: Moto X (1st generation); Moto E (1st generation)
- Compatible networks: GSM Model: 2G: GSM/GPRS/EDGE (850, 900, 1800, 1900 MHz) 3G/LTE: Global GSM Model (XT1032): UMTS/HSPA+ up to 21 Mbps (850, 900, 1900, 2100 MHz) US GSM Model (XT1034): UMTS/HSPA+ up to 21 Mbps (850, 1700 (AWS), 1900 MHz) Asia GSM Model: UMTS/HSPA+ (850, 900, 1700 (AWS), 1900, 2100 MHz) US LTE Model (XT1045): UMTS (850, 900, 1700 (AWS), 1900, 2100 MHz); 4G LTE Bands 2, 4, 5, 17 (1900, 1700, 850, 700 MHz) European LTE Model (XT1039): UMTS (850, 900, 1900, 2100 MHz); 4G LTE Bands 1, 3, 7, 8, 20 (800, 900, 1800, 2100, 2600 MHz) Brazil LTE Model (XT1040): UMTS (850, 1900, 2100 MHz); 4G LTE Bands 4, 7, 28 (1700, 2600, 700 MHz) CDMA Model: CDMA/EVDO Rev A (850, 1900 MHz)
- Dimensions: 129.9 mm (5.11 in) H 65.9 mm (2.59 in) W 11.6 mm (0.46 in) D
- Weight: 143 g (5.0 oz)
- Operating system: Original: Android 4.3 "Jelly Bean"; Current: Android 5.1 "Lollipop"
- System-on-chip: Qualcomm Snapdragon 400
- CPU: 1.2 GHz quad-core Cortex-A7
- GPU: Adreno 305
- Memory: 1 GB RAM
- Storage: 8 GB or 16 GB
- Removable storage: Yes, on LTE model (microSD)
- Battery: 2070 mAh Li-ion battery (Non-removable)
- Rear camera: 5 MP, 3.5mm focal length, f/2.4 aperture with LED flash and Touch Focus
- Front camera: 1.3 MP
- Display: 4.50 in (114 mm) vertical LCD with Corning Gorilla Glass 3; 1280×720 px (329 ppi)
- Connectivity: GPS / GLONASS, Wi-Fi 802.11 b/g/n, Bluetooth 4.0, Micro-USB
- Codename: falcon, peregrine (LTE)
- Website: motorola-global-portal.custhelp.com/app/answers/prod_answer_detail/a_id/97433/p/30,6720,9050

The Moto G is an Android smartphone developed and manufactured by Motorola Mobility, at the time a subsidiary of Google. Released on 13 November 2013, the phone was initially aimed at emerging markets, although it was also available in developed markets as a low-price option.

After six months on the market, the Moto G became Motorola's best-selling smartphone ever, and was the top selling phone in Mexico and Brazil.

The Moto G was succeeded by the second generation Moto G in September 2014.

== Specifications ==
The phone features a 4.5 inch LCD IPS screen and a Qualcomm Snapdragon 400 quad-core processor clocked at 1.2 GHz, paired with the Adreno 305 GPU running at 450 MHz clock speed. The original operating system was Android 4.3 "Jelly Bean", with later updates to 5.1 "Lollipop".

The phone is closely related to the Moto X that was released three months prior and look similar, although there are some key differences. The Moto G is not able to have active notifications, quick capture, and touchless control like the Moto X due to the Moto X using a special processor that would be cost-prohibitive for the Moto G. In addition, the Moto G has a removable back cover so that users can customize the phone, instead of the Moto X's sealed back that is held on with an adhesive.

The original Moto G did not use the LTE network because the standard had not been adopted in emerging markets at that time. On 13 May 2014, Motorola unveiled an updated variant of the phone, the Moto G LTE, which added LTE capability, a gyroscope, and a MicroSD card slot. By January 2015 the Android 5.0.2 "Lollipop" OTA update started rolling out and in September 2015, version 5.1 rolled out in India. As of March 2015, Motorola has been slowly upgrading handsets. Motorola started releasing the 5.1 update for Google Play Edition on April 2, 2015. In the United Kingdom, the 5.1 update started on June 12, 2015.

== Availability ==
The Moto G was released first in Brazil and some parts of Europe. It was released in Canada and the United States on 22 November 2013 and 2 December 2013 respectively. In India, the Moto G was released on 6 February 2014 in an exclusive deal with e-commerce company Flipkart. The Moto G Google Play edition is a global GSM model available unlocked from Google Play. In the United States, the Moto G was available for Verizon, Republic Wireless, Boost Mobile, Sprint (Sprint Prepaid), Cricket Wireless, U.S. Cellular, Straight Talk and Consumer Cellular customers.

== 3G variants ==
Version	Description	Alternate Designations
XT1031	United States (CDMA Version)	XT1028 for Verizon, XT937C for TracFone
XT1032	Global GSM (UMTS Single SIM)	XT1008 for Moto G Forte
XT1033	Asia, Brazil, Colombia (UMTS Dual SIM)	XT1035 on FCC
XT1034	United States GSM (AWS Version)	XT939G for TracFone

Wind Mobile in Canada distribute an AWS version that appears to be using a modified XT1032 baseband.

== LTE variants ==
All LTE variants have 8 GB storage and microSD card slot that takes cards of up to 32 GB.

Version	Region	LTE bands
XT1039	EU, UK, Spain, Germany, Australia, Brazil	1, 3, 7, 8, 20 (800, 900, 1800, 2100, 2600 MHz)
XT1040	Brazil, Colombia, Canada	2, 4, 5, 17 (700, 850, 1700, 1900 MHz)
XT1042	United States, Europe	2, 4, 5, 17 (700, 850, 1700, 1900 MHz)
XT1045	United States	2, 4, 5, 17 (700, 850, 1700, 1900 MHz)

== Critical reception ==
- Digital Trends – Editor's Choice Award
- IT Pro Portal – Best Buy Award
- Trusted Reviews – Product of the Year at the 2013 TrustedReviews Awards
- Trusted Reviews – Best phone under £250 of 2013
- Expert Reviews – Best budget smartphone up to February 2014
- PC Advisor – Best budget smartphone up to May 2014
