= Droid Maxx =

Android smartphone developed by Motorola Mobility

Motorola Droid Maxx (XT1080)
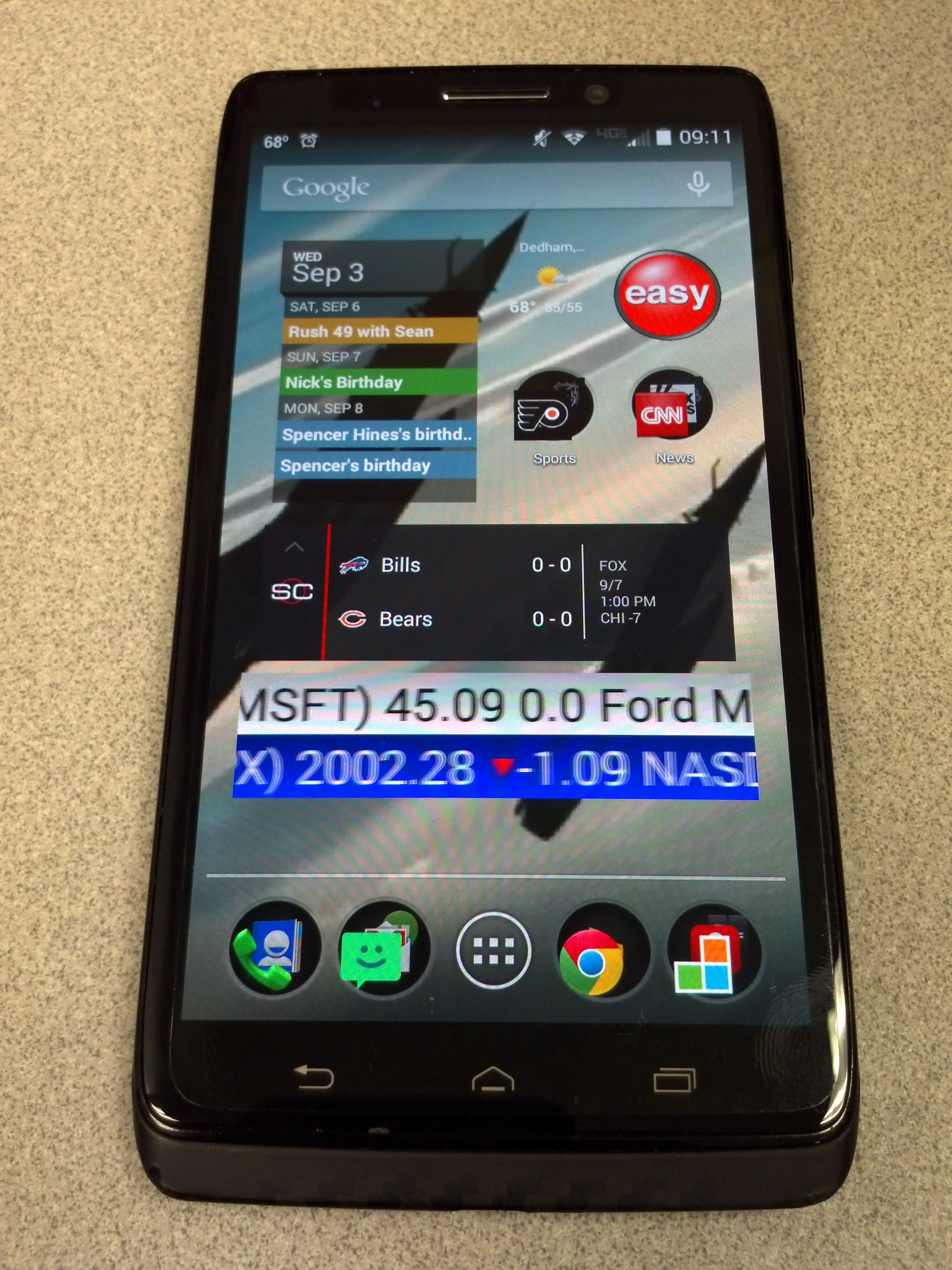
- Motorola Droid Maxx XT1080
- Brand: Droid
- Manufacturer: Motorola Mobility
- Type: Smartphone
- Series: Droid
- First released: July 23, 2013; 12 years ago
- Availability by region: United States August 20, 2013 (Verizon)
- Discontinued: June 2014
- Predecessor: Droid Razr HD; Droid Razr Maxx HD; Motorola Photon Q
- Successor: Droid Turbo, Droid Maxx 2
- Related: Droid Ultra; Droid Mini; Moto X
- Compatible networks: List: CDMA EV-DO rev A; 800, 1900MHz; GSM/GPRS/EDGE 850, 900, 1800, 1900 MHz; UMTS/HSPA 850, 900, 1900, 2100 MHz; LTE 700 MHz Band 13/1700 MHz Band 4; HSDPA+ (4G) 42.2 Mbit/s; HSUPA 5.76 Mbit/s
- Form factor: Slate
- Dimensions: 137.5 mm (5.41 in) H 71.2 mm (2.80 in) W 7.18 mm (0.283 in) D (Droid Ultra); 8.5 mm (0.33 in) D (Droid Maxx)
- Weight: 137 g (4.8 oz) (Ultra); 167 g (5.9 oz) (Maxx)
- Operating system: Original: Android 4.2.2 "Jelly Bean"; Current: Android 4.4.4 "KitKat"
- System-on-chip: Motorola X8 Mobile Computing System
- CPU: 1.7 GHz dual-core Qualcomm 8960 Pro
- GPU: 400 MHz quad-core Adreno 320
- Memory: 2 GiB Dual-channel, 500 MHz LPDDR2 RAM
- Storage: 16 GiB internal flash memory 32 GB internal flash memory
- Removable storage: None
- Battery: 3,500 mAh (Droid Maxx)
- Rear camera: 10 MP (3264×2448 px) 6 MP (3264×1840 px in widescreen mode to fit screen aspect ratio) 1080p video recording (1920×1080, 60 fps)
- Front camera: 2 MP
- Display: 5.0 in (130 mm) diagonal 16:9 aspect ratio widescreen Super AMOLED RGB capacitive, multi-touch touchscreen 720×1280 pixels (294 PPI); 16 M colors
- Sound: Speaker, 3.5mm stereo audio jack
- Media: H.263, H.264, MPEG4, RV v10, RV v9, WMV v10, WMV v9
- Connectivity: List: 3.5 mm stereo audio jack; USB 2.0 Host micro USB; Wi-Fi 802.11a/b/g/n/ac (2.4,5 GHz); 4.0 EDR; 4G Wi-Fi hotspot; aGPS (assisted); sGPS (simultaneous); NFC; GLONASS
- Data inputs: Micro USB 2.0
- SAR: Droid Maxx (head: 1.54 W/kg 1 g body: 0.32 W/kg 1 g hotspot: 1.23 W/kg 1 g)
- Hearing aid compatibility: M4, T4
- Other: Use time: up to 48 hours Standby Time: Up to 20 days Damage-resistance: Corning Gorilla Glass screen, DuPont Kevlar backing, water-repellent nanocoating Media sharing: Miracast wireless video playback Qi wireless charging (Droid Maxx only), 32 GiB variant in matte "black" (discontinued), 16 GiB variant available in matte "black with chrome" and glossy "red"

The Droid Maxx is a smartphone developed by Motorola Mobility. It is the first Droid to be a high-end smartphone exclusively developed by Motorola for Verizon Wireless. It is part of the Verizon Droid line and was announced on 23 July 2013, along with the Droid Ultra and Droid Mini, at a joint Motorola and Verizon Wireless press conference.

The Droid Maxx maintains a similar design to its predecessor, the Droid Razr HD, including the DuPont Kevlar unibody. It included Motorola's proprietary X8 Mobile Computing System, which consists of 8 cores: 2-core Qualcomm Snapdragon S4 Pro applications processor, 4-core Adreno 320 graphics processor, 1 low-power core for natural language processing, and 1 low-power core for contextual awareness processing to enable the new Touchless control feature. The internal battery was increased in size to 3,500 mAh. The on-screen buttons for back, home, and multitasking functions were moved to off-screen capacitive soft keys below the screen. The Droid Maxx also includes Motorola's Active Notification feature.

The reception of the device was mostly positive, with the caveat that it is only available on the US carrier, Verizon Wireless. Some reviewing outlets called the device "the best Android device available on Verizon Wireless". Many others praised Motorola's Active Notification system, which turns on a portion of the AMOLED screen to "blink" notifications to the user rather than a traditional LED notification light. The soft-touch Kevlar unibody, as well as the overall physical design, was praised. Reviewers were mixed to the device's continued use of a 720p HD resolution at a 5 in (130 mm) screen size, though complimented the AMOLED display's brightness, deep blacks, and its benefits to battery conservation.

== Features ==
=== Operating system and software ===
The Droid Maxx runs a mostly stock version of Google's Android mobile operating system, initially shipping with the version Android 4.2.2 Jelly Bean. Jellybean 4.2 included various accessibility improvements, new lock-screen features with quick access to the camera, support for wireless display (Miracast), and a new built-in clock application with world clock, stopwatch, and timer. Motorola and Verizon released an update to Android 4.4 KitKat on 19 December 2013, and an additional update to Android 4.4.4 on 15 July 2014. KitKat brought restyled navigation bars, "immersive" full-screen mode, stronger security, power management and some other minor improvements. Motorola also enhanced its proprietary camera software for better color, exposure, and dynamic range accuracy, and included the updated Google Hangouts application, which included SMS/MMS messaging functionality. Finally, support for the Square credit card reader was added. The KitKat 4.4.4 update brought further improvements to camera functionality, improved Bluetooth connectivity, and added Isis Mobile Wallet (now called Softcard).

The smartphone can share its internet connection over WiFi (hotspot). It can access the Google Play Store, an online distribution platform for the Android OS managed by Google. Users may purchase and download applications developed with the Android SDK, as well as music, movies, television shows, books, and magazine subscriptions. The Droid Maxx, like its Moto X sibling, showcases the Google Now function via Touchless Control, by speaking the hot phrase "Ok Google Now" (even while the phone is asleep), the device will launch a voice assistant that taps into Google Now to control the phone and run natural language queries with the Google search engine, without requiring physical input from the user. This function uses the natural language processor in the X8 system. Active Notifications displays relevant notifications to the user while the phone is face-up. The minimalist notifications show on the lock screen as white icons against a black background; power is conserved by not turning on pixels that would display the black background. Furthermore, using the Contextual Awareness processor in the X8 system and a proximity sensor, the Droid Maxx "knows" when it is face-down or in a pocket and will not display Active Notifications.

=== Design ===
The Droid Maxx user interface consists of three soft keys: back, home, and multitask, lock/power button, and volume rocker keys. The construction is a unibody design (no removable panels) and consists of a thin black bezel devoid of any branding surrounding the screen and a DuPont Kevlar sealed back plate in either matte, clear, or glossy red tint finish. The shape maintains the tapered corner look of the Droid [RAZR] design language. Size has been increased to accommodate a 5 in (130 mm) Super AMOLED touchscreen with a resolution of 720x1280 pixels at 294 ppi, made of Corning Gorilla Glass 3. The device is 8.5 mm (0.33 in) thick and weighs 167 grams (5.9 oz).

=== Hardware ===
Droid Maxx is powered by the proprietary Motorola X8 system-on-chip. It includes a total of 8 cores with various functions: a 2-core Qualcomm Snapdragon S4 Pro applications processor clocked at 1.7 GHz, a 4-core Adreno 320 graphics processor, and 2 low-power cores for natural language processing and contextual awareness. The X8 system is designed to conserve power by utilizing low-power cores for the language and contextual processing. The device's battery is 3500 mAh, which provides a claimed 48 hours of "typical" usage. The phone comes with either 16 or 32 gigabytes of onboard storage as well as NFC capability and Qi wireless charging.
