= Moto E (1st generation) =

Android smartphone developed by Motorola Mobility

Moto E ,Moto E Dual Sim
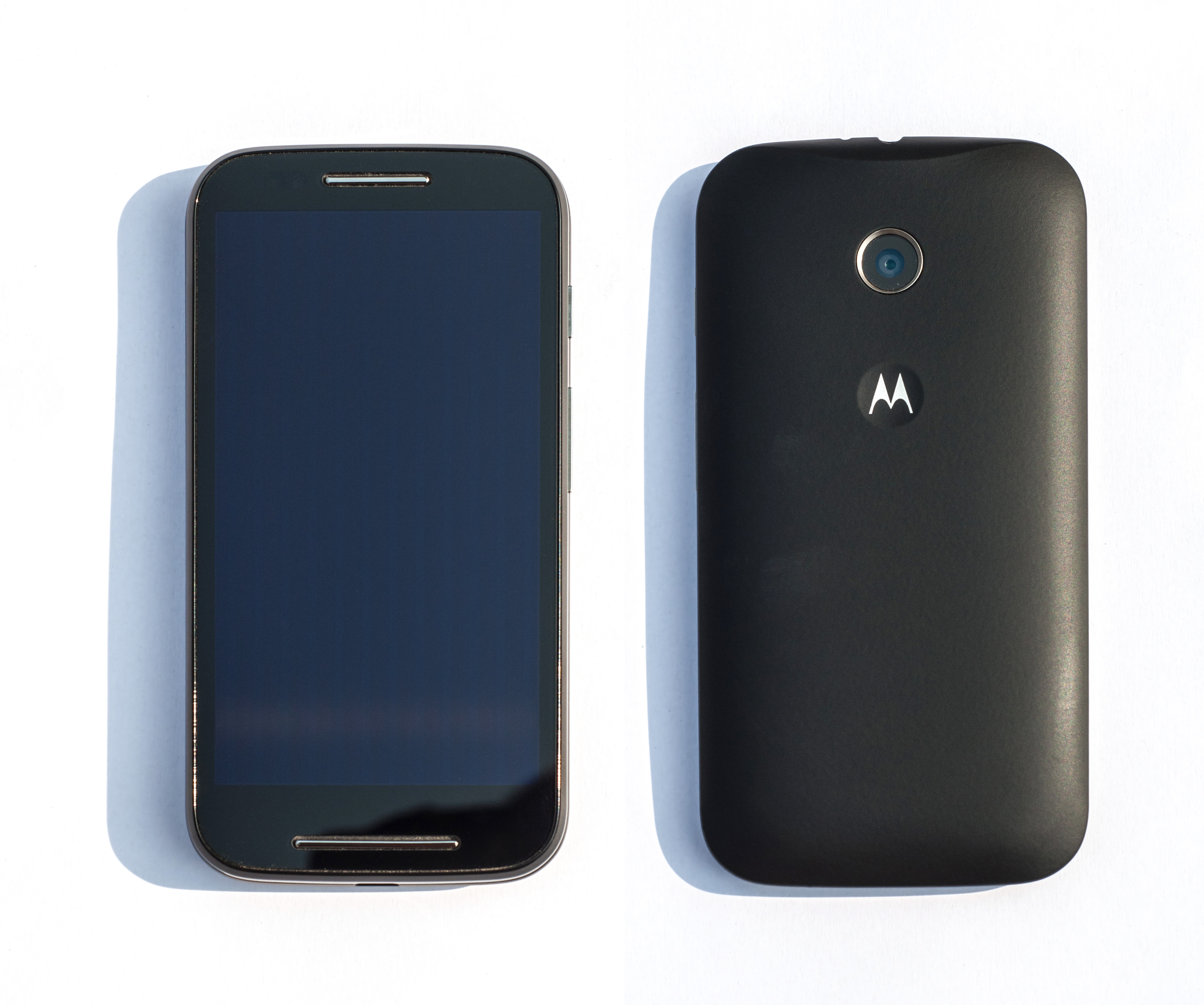
- Manufacturer: Motorola Mobility
- Type: Smartphone
- First released: May 13, 2014
- Discontinued: Yes
- Predecessor: Droid Mini
- Successor: Moto E (2nd generation)
- Related: Moto G (1st generation); Moto X (1st generation)
- Compatible networks: 2G/3G; Global GSM Model: GSM/GPRS/EDGE (850, 900, 1800, 1900 MHz); UMTS/HSPA+ up to 21 Mbps (850, 900, 1900, 2100 MHz)
- Dimensions: 124.8 mm (4.91 in) H 64.8 mm (2.55 in) W 12.3 mm (0.48 in) D
- Weight: 142 g (5.0 oz)
- Operating system: Android 4.4.4 "KitKat" upgradable to Android 5.1.1 "Lollipop"
- System-on-chip: Qualcomm MSM 8210 Snapdragon 200
- CPU: 1.2 GHz Dual-core Cortex A7
- GPU: Adreno 302
- Memory: 1 GB RAM
- Storage: 4 GB (2.1 GB usable)
- Removable storage: MicroSDHC (up to 32 GB)
- Battery: 1,980 mAh
- Rear camera: 5 MP, fixed focus, no flash
- Display: 4.30 in (109 mm) diagonal LCD with Corning Gorilla Glass 3; 540x960 px (256 ppi)
- Connectivity: GPS / GLONASS, Wi-Fi 802.11 b/g/n, Bluetooth 4.0, FM Radio, Micro USB, 3.5mm audio jack
- Codename: Condor
- Website: www.motorola.com/us/consumers/shop-all-mobile-phones/Moto-E/moto-e.html

The first generation Moto E is an Android smartphone developed and manufactured by Motorola Mobility. It was unveiled and released online in India and the United States on May 13, 2014.

Released in the wake of the success of the Moto G, the Moto E was designed to be a durable, low-end device marketed to first-time smartphone owners and budget-minded consumers, especially in emerging markets.

The Moto E was well received by U.S. technology publications, which praised its relatively high quality compared to other low-end smartphones common in emerging markets. However, it lacked a front-facing camera and a flash. In India, the release of the Moto E was met with similarly high demand to that of the Moto G's Indian release, crashing the website of Flipkart. This online retailer exclusively markets the device in the country.

The Moto E was succeeded by the second-generation model in February 2015.

== Development ==
The Moto E was designed to specifically compete against feature phones in emerging markets; according to Charlie Tritschler, Motorola's senior vice-president of products, the Moto E's goal was to "end the feature phone", and the device was primarily targeted towards "people who have been on the edge for a while but just didn’t think they could afford a smartphone." The Moto E carries on from the entry-level Moto G, which it released in late 2013; the Moto G was a major success for the company—who had been acquired by Google Inc. in 2012, and was in the process of being sold to Lenovo as of January 2014. In the first quarter of 2014, Motorola sold 6.5 million phones—a number led by strong sales of the Moto G, especially in markets such as the United Kingdom—where the company accounted for 6% of smartphone sales sold in the quarter, up from nearly 0.

Sales of the Moto G were also notably large in the emerging market of India; Magnus Ahlqvist, vice president of Motorola's EMEA division, estimated that between 65 and 70% of users in India still used feature phones. In February 2014, Motorola had partnered with the online retailer Flipkart to be the exclusive retailer of the Moto G in India, marking its first release in the country since 2012. The website's initial stock of 20,000 units sold out within hours, and it sold 247,000 Moto G units in just two months, ranking as the 12th-highest-selling smartphone in the country for the first quarter of 2014.

Trischler noted that durability was a key selling point in emerging markets, explicitly citing the device's use of Gorilla Glass 3, an anti-smudge screen coating, and a similar splashproof coating to the Moto G, which he also noted were attributes that are not typically seen in such low-end products. The company also emphasized its efforts to reduce the cost of constructing the phone—expanding upon those used by the Moto G. Tritschler stated that these measures must be designed "...[right] into the product; you can’t just cut the price." Overall, the Moto E was 40% cheaper than the Moto G. The version of Android shipped on the device, 4.4.2 "KitKat", contains several changes designed to optimize the operating system for low-end devices such as the Moto G and E. To emphasize the device's performance, Motorola argued in a demonstration that the Moto E was slightly faster than the high-end Samsung Galaxy S4 at performing basic tasks such as launching certain apps (such as the camera, web browser and dialer) and going back to the home screen from an app.

=== Release ===
The Moto E was unveiled on May 13, 2014. India was one of the first countries where the Moto E was released; it was sold exclusively by Flipkart, where it retailed for ₹6,999 (US$73) without a contract. Upon its midnight launch, demand for the device was so high that the resulting surge in orders crashed the website. The device was also released online through Motorola's website in the United States and in the United Kingdom. The Moto E was to be released in other markets, such as Brazil, Canada, Mexico, and Spain.

== Specifications ==
The Moto E's build and design are similar to those of the Moto G, with a "splashproof" coating, curved backing, and a front-mounted speaker below the screen. The device is available in either black or white front colors, and has an interchangeable rear cover with different color options. It features a 4.3 inches (11 cm) IPS qHD display, coated with Gorilla Glass 3. The device uses a dual-core 1.2 GHz Qualcomm Snapdragon 200 processor, and includes 1 GB of RAM. The Moto E has 4 GB of internal storage, which can be expanded up to 32 GB with a MicroSDHC card. The Moto E only supports up to 3G connectivity, and was available in a dual SIM model in selected markets. The device includes a non-removable 1980 mAh battery, which Motorola touted as having "all-day" battery life. The Moto E features a 5-megapixel rear-facing fixed-focus camera; the device does not include a flash or a front-facing camera.

The Moto E shipped with Android 4.4 "KitKat". Several Motorola-specific apps are included, including Assist, as introduced by the Moto X, which automatically turn on or off certain modes, such as silencing the ringer or auto replying to text messages, depending on certain scenarios—such as when a user is in a meeting as determined by their calendar, or driving. The Moto E also includes a new "Alert" app, which allows users to notify others of their location. Motorola committed to upgrading the Moto E to the next major version of Android following its release: an update to Android 5.0 "Lollipop" was released in February 2015.

== Reception ==
Vlad Savov of The Verge praised the Moto E's design for not appearing "downmarket" and for having adequate performance, but noted that the device's camera was not as good as those on other smartphones. He went on to say that "a market populated by the likes of the Galaxy Fame and Galaxy Young—both of which are stuck on Android 4.1 with little hope of an upgrade—hadn't seen anything like the quick and well-made G before. Or since, for that matter." Chris Velazco of Engadget was relatively positive, noting that the Moto E was well-designed and carried the trademark design cues of Motorola's recent products, while praising its vivid display, along with its sufficient performance, battery life, and nearly stock Android software. In conclusion, it was felt that "for all its minor shortcomings, the Moto E still represents a level of power and quality that's become even more accessible to people the world over, and that's something worth celebrating. If all you need is a smartphone that can take you to Facebook, capture fodder for Instagram or fire off missives on Twitter (or WhatsApp or Weibo), the Moto E will make a worthy sidekick. Not every important device has to be a flashy flagship." However, the device was still panned for its limited internal storage and for lacking a camera flash or a front-facing camera.
