= Motorola X8 Mobile Computing System =

Smartphone chipset

Motorola X8 Mobile Computing System is a chipset from Motorola for Android-based smartphones, based on Qualcomm Snapdragon System on a chip S4 Pro. CPU of S4 Pro is ARM-compatible dual-core Krait, and GPU of this chip is 4-core Adreno 320. Several low-power DSP chips were added by Motorola to S4 Pro in the chipset to process audio and inputs from other sensors.

== Composition ==
- Qualcomm Snapdragon S4 Pro SoC (MSM8960, DT version), built with 28 nm process node, with:
  - 1.7 GHz dual-core ARM-compatible Krait processor
  - quad-core Adreno 320 GPU
- natural language processor - single-core
- contextual awareness processor - single-core

== Loaded smartphones ==
- Motorola Droid Ultra
- Motorola Droid Maxx
- Motorola Droid Mini
- Motorola Moto X
