= Moto X (1st generation) =

Android smartphone developed by Motorola Mobility

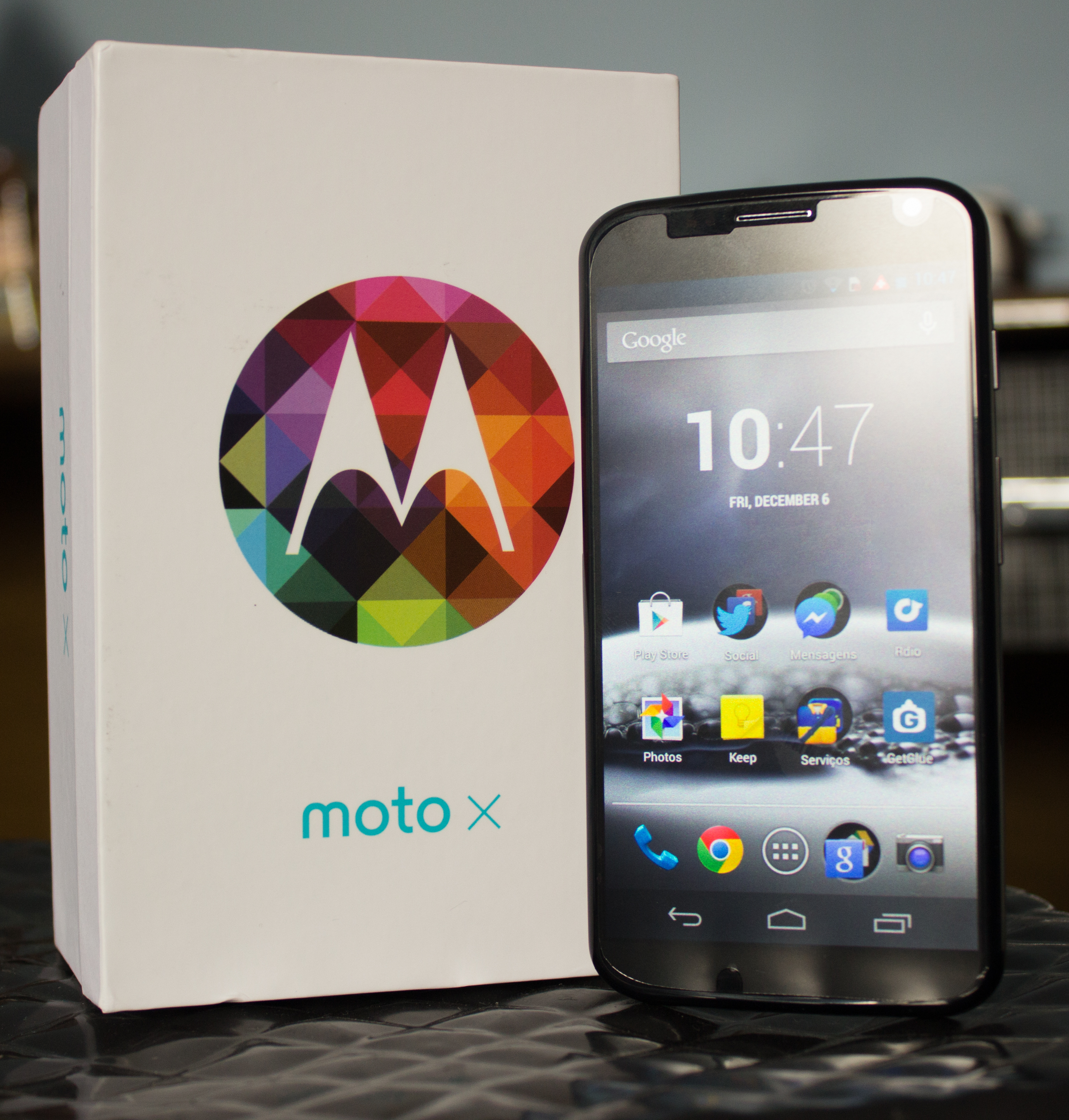
- Manufacturer: Motorola Mobility
- Type: Smartphone
- First released: August 23, 2013; 13 years ago
- Successor: Moto X (2nd generation)
- Related: Moto G (1st generation); Moto E (1st generation); Moto 360
- Form factor: Touchscreen
- Dimensions: 129.3 mm (5.09 in) H 65.3 mm (2.57 in) W 10.4 mm (0.41 in) D Curve 5.7–10.4 mm
- Weight: 130 g (4.6 oz)
- Operating system: Original: Android 4.2 "Jelly Bean"; Current: Android 5.1 "Lollipop" (Moto X XT1050 CDMA)- Android 4.4.2 "KitKat
- CPU: Modified 1.7 GHz dual-core Qualcomm Snapdragon S4 ProMobility Motorola X8 Mobile Computing System (8 cores)
- GPU: Quad-core Adreno 320 @ 400 MHz
- Memory: 2 GiB RAM
- Storage: 16, 32 or 64 GiB
- Battery: 2200 mAh
- Rear camera: 10 megapixels, 1080p HD video recording
- Front camera: 2 megapixels
- Display: 4.7″ diagonal HD 1280×720 (316 ppi) AMOLED (RGB) with Corning Gorilla Glass 3
- Sound: Mono speaker on back
- Connectivity: GPS, Wi-Fi, NFC, Bluetooth, USB, USB otg, Mirror Screen, Miracast, Motorola Connect
- Development status: Discontinued
- Made in: USA, China
- Website: Moto X (1st Gen.) at the Wayback Machine (archived 2014-12-02)

The first-generation Moto X is an Android smartphone developed and manufactured by Motorola Mobility and released in August 2013.

The Moto X was the first smartphone from the company fully developed under Google - which acquired Motorola Mobility in 2012 – introduced with a brand refresh, and a new flagship design language replacing the "sharp" metallic and Kevlar coating used since the original Droid. It was primarily aimed at "mainstream" consumers, distinguished by features taking advantage of voice recognition (through Google Now) and contextual awareness, the ability for users to custom-order the device in their own choice of color options, and emphasizing the fact that the phone had final assembly completed in the United States. It was backed by a large advertising campaign. The Moto X was available on all U.S. carriers rather than being a Verizon exclusive.

Moto X was met with mostly positive reviews, with particular praise for its hardware design, Motorola's new approach to customizing Android, its suite of contextual features, and the influence of its "mainstream" targeting on overall performance, user experience, and battery life. Its camera, while praised for its user interface, was criticised for inconsistent image quality (later updated via an OTA software patch) and for the lack of certain advanced features for the sake of simplicity. Before its release, it was tipped as Motorola's "comeback" device. Despite positive reception, the Moto X did not fare well commercially, having failed to grasp enough sales against rival makes.

The Moto X was succeeded by the second generation Moto X on September 5, 2014.

== Development ==
On August 15, 2011, Google announced its intent to acquire Motorola Mobility for $12.5 billion; At the time, Motorola had its fifth straight quarter of losses, and Google also wanted to have access to the company's portfolio of 17,000 issued patents as a means of defending its Android mobile operating system. Following the closure of the acquisition in 2012, rumors began circulating that Google and Motorola were developing a device known internally as the "X Phone", which would be the company's next flagship device. Reports indicated that the device was to focus on unique functionality to compete with Apple and fellow Android vendor Samsung, and that the company had experimented with curved screens and ceramics as possible hardware features. While Motorola's new CEO Dennis Woodside declined to comment directly on the X Phone project, he did mention that the company now had the "resources to do big things" because of its acquisition by Google and that Motorola was "investing in a team and a technology that will do something quite different than the current approaches."

At a press conference hosted by AllThingsD in May 2013, Woodside publicly teased a new Motorola device known as Moto X. Although Woodside did not present the device (which he claimed was in his pocket), he did reveal that Moto X would be "contextually aware", and had two special processors which would allow it to do so while maintaining sufficient battery life. Woodside also announced that the phone would be designed and manufactured in a factory outside of Fort Worth, employing 2,000 people, and would be released by October 2013. Later details revealed that the phone would be available across all four national carriers in the United States, and that Motorola planned to spend $500 million on marketing Moto X. The device was designed to appeal to mainstream users as determined by focus groups and surveys, with a focus on unique functionality and ensuring long battery life as opposed to a focus on reaching high-end specifications. Motorola design head Jim Wicks stated that Moto X was "really not about being intimidating and tech, it's really about being human and comfortable."

Moto X was revealed publicly for the first time during a press event on August 1, 2013, where it was announced that all major U.S. carriers would release the device, while Rogers Wireless later announced it would exclusively sell the device in Canada.

Motorola specifically stated that it would release the device only in North America and had "[no] immediate plans" to release it in Europe. However, the company hinted that it had "exciting plans" for a separate device tailored to the European market (Motorola later announced the entry-level Moto G (1st generation) in November 2013 with a broad international release). However, in January 2014, Motorola announced that it would soon release the phone in France, Germany, and the United Kingdom. In particular, Motorola scheduled a British release for February 1, 2014. The Moto X began retailing in India on March 19, 2014.

A "Developer Edition" with an unlockable bootloader was released in late September 2013. On September 19, 2013, Republic Wireless announced that they would offer Moto X without a service contract at a significantly lower price compared to the Developer Edition and other models sold without a contract.

In May 2014, Motorola ultimately announced that it would wind down operations at the Fort Worth plant due to the high costs of domestically producing high-end smartphones like the Moto X in relation to the device's overall sales. The decision was unrelated to Google's proposed sale of Motorola to the Chinese company Lenovo.

== Specifications ==
=== Hardware ===
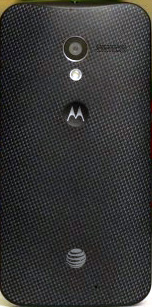
Moto X back cover

Moto X uses a polycarbonate-based construction with a slightly rounded rear. The device is powered by a chipset branded as the X8 Mobile Computing System, which consists of a dual-core, 1.7 GHz Qualcomm Snapdragon S4 Pro system-on-chip with a quad-core Adreno 320 GPU, a custom-designed Natural Language Processor core and Contextual Awareness Processor core (for a total of 8 cores), and 2 GB of RAM. It uses a 4.7-inch 720p Super AMOLED display; Wicks referred to the size as a "sweet spot" for phone displays, and argued that using a 1080p display like other recent high-end phones "would just suck battery and nobody would know the difference." The display is covered with Corning Gorilla Glass 3 for scratch resistance. The device includes a non-removable 2200 mAh battery, which Wicks claimed could achieve full-day battery life. The device also includes a 10-megapixel camera with "Clear Pixel" technology, which the company claimed could capture 75% more light, improving performance in low-light conditions. The device is available with either 16 or 32 GB of non-expandable storage.

==== Moto Maker ====
Users can custom-order their Moto X through an online service known as Moto Maker; which allows users to choose between black and white colors for the front of the device, 26 color or 4 real wood options for the rear cover, 10 colors for "accents" (including the camera ring and bezel buttons), the option of a custom engraved message on the rear cover, 16, 32, or 64 GB of storage, custom text on boot-screen, and to pre-configure the device's Google account and wallpaper. Devices customized through Moto Maker are shipped within 7 days of purchase. At launch, Moto Maker was only available to those purchasing the device through AT&T, with all other carriers carrying the device only in black and white.

On November 11, 2013, Moto Maker became available to Sprint, T-Mobile, and Verizon customers. On December 17, 2013, the bamboo wood rear cover option was released on Moto Maker. On January 21, 2014, additional wood rear covers--walnut, ebony, and teak—were released on Moto Maker. On April 1, Moto Maker was opened up to Republic Wireless users as well.

=== Software ===
Moto X initially shipped with a stock version of Android 4.2, but enhanced with several additional features. Among these features is a voice recognition system; by leveraging the on-board Natural Language Processor, the device can be trained to recognize its user's voice. Once configured, the phone will automatically respond to a user-set phrase, such as "Ok Moto X" (even in sleep mode), to launch a voice assistant that can perform various tasks. Active Notifications wakes the phone to display notifications received by the user on a special white-on-black lock screen—the feature takes advantage of AMOLED zero-power black (rendered by not turning on the pixel at all), to show live messages with minimal battery impact. The Assist feature can automatically turn on or off specific modes, such as silencing the ringer, auto-replying to text messages, or activating voice controls, depending on scenarios—such as when a user is in a meeting, as determined by their calendar, or driving.

The Moto X camera software features a full-screen image, a "touch anywhere" to shoot interface, touch-and-hold to focus/set exposure, a "dial-in" touch to set exposure, and automatically optimizes itself for each photo. The camera can be activated by performing a quick "double-twist".

In late-November 2013, U.S. carriers began pushing an update to Android 4.4 for the device. Among other changes, it expanded the Touchless Control functionality that can be used without unlocking the phone. It allowed users to speak their PIN to unlock the phone.

Beginning in March 2015, Motorola rolled out an update to Android 5.0.2 "Lollipop" for the first-generation Moto X, followed by Android 5.1.

== Reception ==
The Moto X has received generally positive reviews. Its design was typically praised for appearing well-built; Joshua Topolsky, editor-in-chief of The Verge described the Moto X's exterior as "a solid—if somewhat anonymous—slab of space-age plastics, soft-touch surfaces, and crystal clear Corning glass." While Joseph Volpe of Engadget panned its design for resembling a Fisher-Price toy, this criticism was defended by considering the phone to be as durable as one. Its display was considered acceptable, but a noticeable downgrade from recent phones incorporating 1080p displays. Although it was acknowledged that the Moto X had relatively lower performance in comparison to quad-core flagship phones, the Moto X's performance was generally considered to be sufficient for "real world" users, with Toposlky remarking that "for now, our phone hardware is clearly more capable than it needs to be; mid-range seems to be just fine in this case." Its battery life was also praised; while not as good as Motorola's own Droid Razr Maxx, the Moto X's battery was able to meet and exceed the company's own estimates of "24-hour" battery life on a single charge under real-world usage scenarios.

The Moto X was praised for its emphasis on enhancing the stock Android experience seamlessly rather than heavily modifying it (as the company had done in the past with its Motoblur software). The Touchless Control and Active Display features were praised for their intuitiveness and usefulness, with Volpe going so far as to dub them "Motorola's new killer Android feature". However, Volpe criticized Touchless Control for feeling like a gimmick. In contrast, Toposlky criticized it for having inconsistent voice recognition, and for being "rendered nearly useless" if locks are enabled on the device, noting that "you can still use it to make calls, but everything else requires that you unlock your phone, which requires that you pick it up and interact with it… meaning you just defeated the whole idea of 'touchless controls.'" The Assist feature was praised for being the best demonstration of the device's contextual awareness capabilities, with Topolsky stating that "I’m not sure what impressed me more: the ease of this function, or the fact that I didn't have to think about where I was and what mode I was in."

Volpe considered the Moto X's camera software to be "basically idiot-proof", allowing users to take photographs without needing specialized camera knowledge, letting the camera adjust itself for each photo automatically. However, Topolsky discovered that "somehow the Moto X’s post-processing is so aggressive and so ubiquitous that it ruins as many shots as it saves. There’s terrible artifacting and noise even in well-lit photos—like you cranked the JPEG settings way down." The camera was also criticized for having inconsistent focus and exposure, and for lacking certain advanced options.

In conclusion, although Volpe criticized it as too expensive for a "mid-range" device, the Moto X was generally considered an innovative device. Topolsky gave it an 8 out of 10, stating that "the Moto X is not a perfect phone, but neither is any other phone on the market right now. What it is, however, is a pretty damn good phone and one I can recommend." Alex Roth of TechRadar gave the device a 4 out of 5, noting that "if only the camera were better and Motorola's apps were a little sharper, I'd give it a no-holds-barred recommendation. As it is now, the Moto X deserves to be in the conversation when discussing the best Android has to offer, but a few key flaws keep it from being called an excellent phone."

=== Patent litigation ===
In July 2014, a German court ruled that Moto X and Moto G infringed patents on the use of LPKF Laser & Electronics's patented Laser Direct Structuring (LDS) process in the design of their antennas. Unless an appeal or settlement is reached, the company may now ban the products from sale in Germany.

== Variants ==
The Moto X has several variants to support 3G and 4G networks of different carriers:

Model	FCC id	Carriers/Regions	CDMA bands	GSM bands	UMTS bands	LTE bands	Notes
XT1049	IHDT56PB2	Republic Wireless US	800/1900	Quad	850/1900/2100	25	The GSM/UMTS network functions have been disabled by firmware and are SIM locked
XT1050	IHDT56PB1	Regional US (NVC, Inland Cellular, Illinois Valley Cellular, etc.)	800/1900	Quad	850/900/1900/2100	4/13	SIM unlocked
XT1052	IHDT56PA3	Europe, Asia, Australia	N/A	Quad	850/900/1800/1900/2100	3/7/20	SIM unlocked
XT1053	IHDT56PA2	GSM Unlocked US, GSM Dev Edition US, Nextel México	N/A	Quad	850/900/1700/1900/2100	2/4/17	SIM unlocked and compatible with most GSM networks including AT&T Mobility and T-Mobile US; The GSM unlocked variant ships with a T-Mobile US SIM
XT1055	IHDT56PB3	U.S. Cellular US	800/1900	Quad	850/900/1900/2100	4/5/12	
XT1056	IHDT56PB2	Sprint US	800/1900	Quad	850/1900/2100	25	The GSM/UMTS network functions have been disabled by firmware and are SIM locked for US carriers
XT1058	IHDT56PA1	AT&T US, Fido CA, Rogers CA, Claro Puerto Rico, Movistar, Claro Brazil, Vivo Brazil, Oi Brazil, TIM Brazil, Movistar Colombia, Claro Colombia	N/A	Quad	850/900/1900/2100	2/4/5/7/17	The AT&T variant is manufactured in the United States and SIM locked, whereas the non-US variants are manufactured in China and SIM unlocked.
XT1060	IHDT56PB1	Verizon US	850/1900	Quad	850/900/1900/2100	4/13	Developer Edition is also available though Motorola's website. It claims it only supports LTE band 13, Verizon lists both

All variants support four 2G GSM bands 850/900/1800/1900. All customized phones, non-customized AT&T phones, and 32GB are assembled in the United States. All the rest (non-customized and 16GB) are manufactured in China.

== See also ==
- Droid Maxx
