= S-GPS =

System to allow GPS and CDMA reception simultaneously

Simultaneous GPS (S-GPS) is a method to allow a GPS reception and CDMA communications to operate simultaneously in a mobile phone.

Ordinarily, cellular geolocation and a built-in GPS receiver is used to determine the location of an E911 call made from CDMA phones. By using a time-multiplexed scheme called TM-GPS, the reception of the telephone call and the GPS signal are alternated one after the other, requiring only one radio receiver.

Simultaneous GPS allows a cellphone to receive both GPS and voice data at the same time, which improves sensitivity and allows service providers to offer location-based services. The use of two radios with a single antenna imparts new design challenges, such as leakage of the voice transmitter signal into the GPS receiver circuitry. The commercial availability of S-GPS chipsets from manufacturers such as Qualcomm, has led to adoption of the method in newer handsets.

== See also ==
- Assisted GPS
