= Motorola Mobility =

American consumer electronics company

Motorola Mobility LLC
- Logo used since 25 May 2017

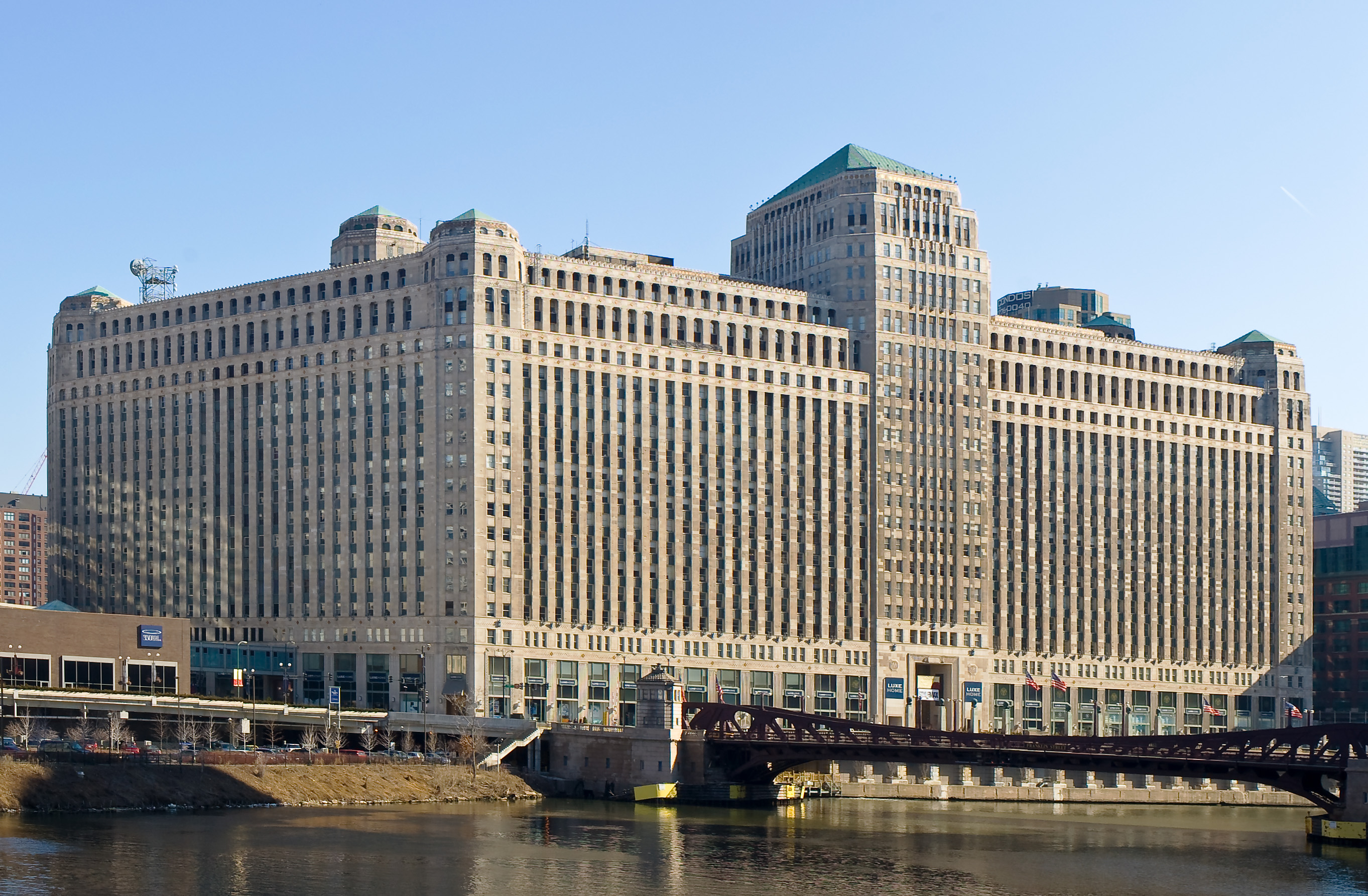
- Headquarters at Merchandise Mart, Chicago, Illinois
- Formerly: Motorola Mobility Holdings, Inc. (4 January 2011 –17 October 2014)
- Type: Subsidiary
- Industry: Consumer electronics
- Predecessor: Motorola, Inc.
- Founded: January 4, 2011; 15 years ago
- Headquarters: Merchandise Mart, Chicago, Illinois, United States
- Area served: Worldwide
- Key people: Luca Rossi (general manager); Rudi Kalil (president, North America)
- Products: Smartphones; Smartwatches; Smartphone accessories Televisions
- Number of employees: 1,001–5,000
- Parent: Google (2012–2014); Lenovo (2014–present)
- Subsidiaries: Motorola Trademark Holdings, LLC
- Website: motorola.com

Motorola Mobility LLC, marketed and commonly known as Motorola (styled motorola in the current logo), is an American consumer electronics manufacturer primarily producing smartphones running Android software and other wearable accessories. Motorola Mobility is headquartered at Merchandise Mart in Chicago, Illinois, which houses all research and development and where its products are designed (with the exception of its tablets). The company has been a wholly owned subsidiary of Chinese company Lenovo since 2014, which handles device manufacturing and supply chain.

Motorola Mobility was formed on January 4, 2011 after a split of the original Motorola Inc., founded in 1928, into two separate companies, with Motorola Mobility assuming the company's consumer-oriented product lines, including its mobile phone business, as well as its cable modems and pay television set-top boxes, while the enterprise and radio communication division continues as Motorola Solutions, a legal successor of the original company. In May 2012, Google acquired Motorola Mobility for US$12.5 billion; the main intent of the purchase was to gain Motorola Mobility's patent portfolio, in order to protect other Android vendors from litigation. Shortly after the purchase, Google sold Motorola Mobility's cable modem and set-top box business to Arris Group, and products increasingly focused on entry-level smartphones. Under the ATAP division, Google also began development on Project Ara. In October 2014, Google sold Motorola Mobility for $2.91 billion to Lenovo, which excluded ATAP and most of the patents. Lenovo's existing smartphone division was subsumed by Motorola Mobility.

The company currently sells a range of smartphones, mainly consisting of the high-end Edge series, the Razr series of foldables, the Moto G series, as well as a number of other series and products depending on region, all running Android with an interface called "Hello UI". As of 2026, its flagship device is the Motorola Signature, and Signature 27.

== History ==
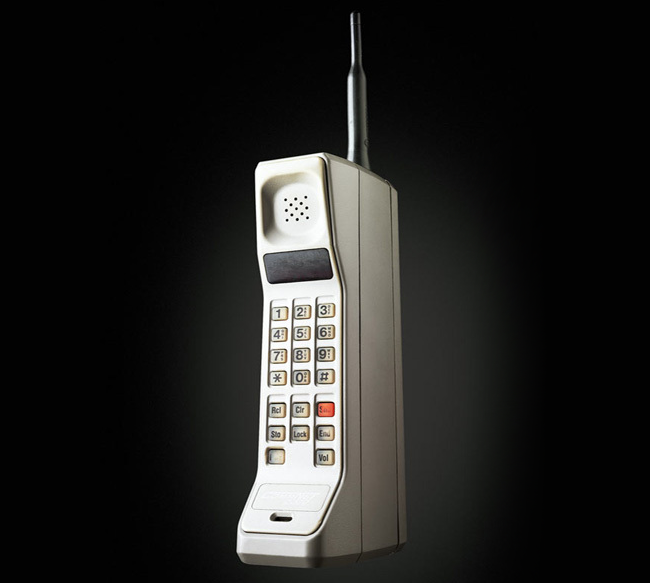
A 1984 Motorola DynaTAC 8000X

On January 4, 2011, Motorola, Inc. was split into two publicly traded companies; Motorola Solutions took on the company's enterprise-oriented business units, while the remaining mostly consumer divisions were taken on by Motorola Mobility. The original company had been a pioneer in the development of cellular phones. After the major success of RAZR V3, the company was unable to keep up and quickly lost market share to rivals such as Nokia, Apple, and Samsung, leading to major financial losses that culminated in the company's split. Legally, the split was structured so that Motorola Inc. changed its name to Motorola Solutions and spun off Motorola Mobility as a new publicly traded company.

=== 2011–2012: Independent ===
The company's original logo, used from 2011 to 2012

Motorola Mobility originally consisted of the mobile devices business, which produced smartphones, mobile accessories including Bluetooth headphones, and the home business, which produced set-top boxes, end-to-end video solutions, cordless phones, and cable modems.

In the run up to the company's formation, Motorola Defy, Droid Pro, Droid 2 (global) and Bravo were among the handsets introduced. At the 2011 Consumer Electronic Show, Motorola Mobility introduced the Motorola Atrix 4G, Droid Bionic and Cliq 2 handsets, as well as the Motorola Xoom tablet. At Mobile World Congress the company also announced the Motorola Gleam flip phone and Motorola Pro for GSM networks. In Q1 2011, the company reported revenues of $3 billion (up 22% from a year prior) and sales of 9.3 million mobile devices, including 4.1 million smartphones.

In June 2011, the company launched their third generation Droid, Droid 3. They also announced other products during this time including the Motorola Photon 4G and the Motorola Wilder feature phone.

On October 18, 2011, Motorola Mobility announced the Droid Razr smartphone, bringing back the Razr brand that had been very popular as the Razr V3 in the 2000s.

=== 2012–2014: Google ownership ===
On August 15, 2011, American technology company Google announced that it would acquire Motorola Mobility for $12.5 billion, pending regulatory approval. Critics viewed Google as being a white knight, since Motorola Mobility had recently had a fifth straight quarter of losses. Google planned to operate Motorola Mobility as an independent company. In a post on the company's blog, Google CEO and co-founder Larry Page revealed that Google's acquisition of Motorola Mobility was a strategic move to strengthen Google's patent portfolio. At the time, the company had 17,000 patents, with 7,500 patents pending. The expanded portfolio was to defend the viability of its Android operating system, which had been the subject of numerous patent infringement lawsuits between device vendors and other companies such as Apple, Microsoft and Oracle.

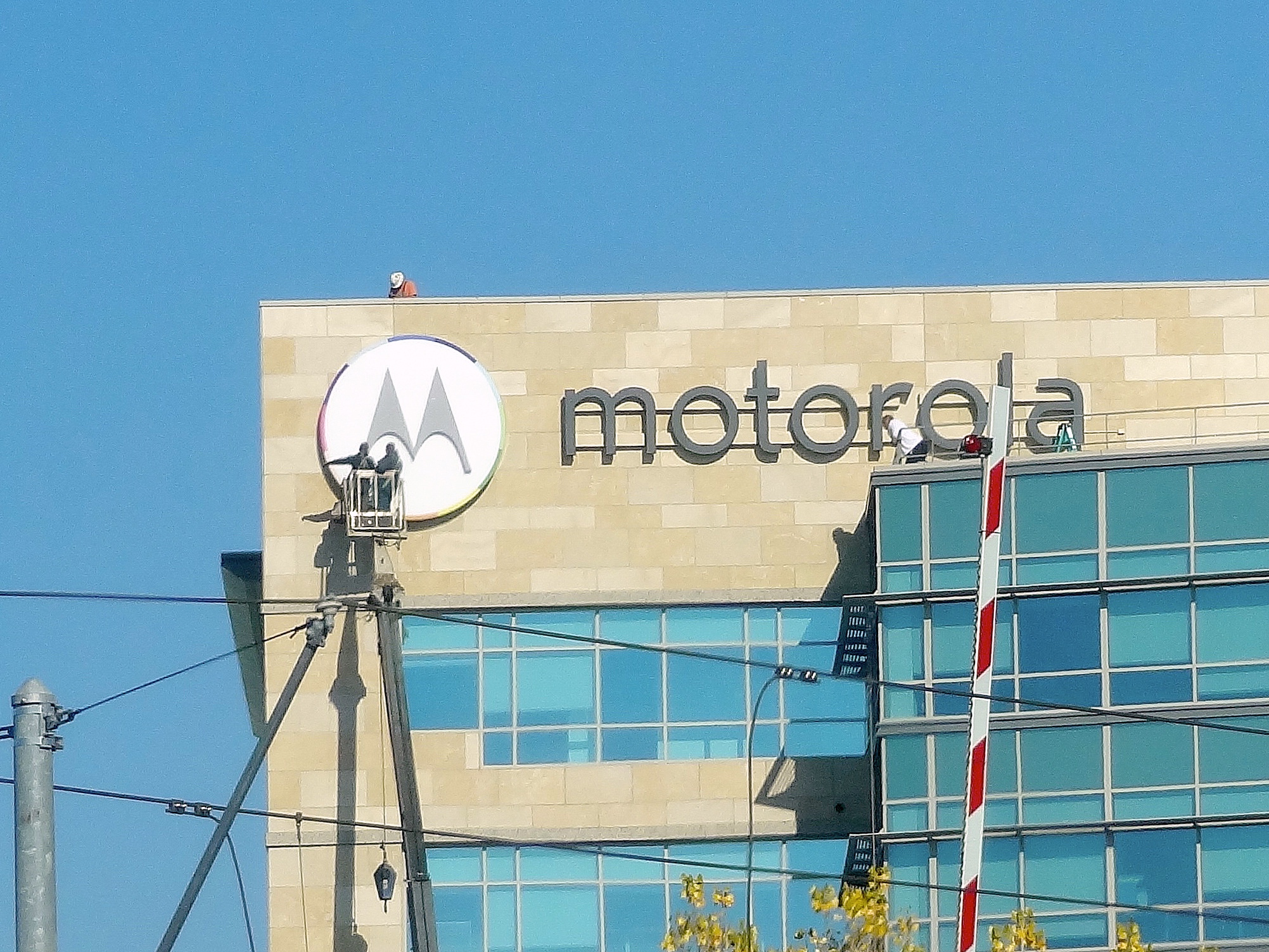
The installation of the 2013–2014 Motorola Mobility logo near the main Google campus, following Google's purchase. The office on the photo has since been closed.

On November 17, 2011, Motorola Mobility announced that its shareholders voted in favor of the company's acquisition by Google for $12.5 billion. The deal received regulatory approval from the United States Department of Justice and the European Union on February 13, 2012. The deal received subsequent approval from Chinese authorities and was completed on May 22, 2012. Alongside the completion of the acquisition, Motorola Mobility's CEO Sanjay Jha was replaced by Dennis Woodside, a former senior vice president at Google.

After the Google acquisition, Motorola announced that they will not produce any Windows Phone devices.

On August 13, 2012, Google announced that it would cut 4,000 employees and close one third of the company's locations, mostly outside the US.

On December 19, 2012, it was announced that Arris Group would purchase Motorola Mobility's cable modem and set-top box business for $2.35 billion in a cash-and-stock transaction.

In May 2013, Motorola Mobility opened a factory in Fort Worth, Texas, with the intent to assemble customized smartphones in the US. At its peak, the factory employed 3,800 workers. On April 9, 2014, following the departure of Woodside, lead product developer Rick Osterloh was named the new president of Motorola Mobility.

Under Google ownership, Motorola Mobility's market share would be boosted by a focus on high-quality entry-level smartphones, aimed primarily at emerging markets; in the first quarter of 2014, Motorola Mobility sold 6.5 million phones—led by strong sales of its low-end Moto G, especially in markets such as India, and in the United Kingdom—where the company accounted for 6% of smartphone sales sold in the quarter, up from nearly zero. These goals were compounded further by the May 2014 introduction of the Moto E—a low-end device aimed at first-time smartphone owners in emerging markets. In May 2014, Motorola Mobility announced that it would close its Fort Worth factory by the end of the year, citing the high costs of domestic manufacturing in combination with the weak sales of the Moto X (which was customized and assembled at the plant) and the company's increased emphasis on low-end devices and emerging markets.

=== 2014–2019: Lenovo ownership ===
On January 29, 2014, Google announced it would, pending regulatory approval, sell Motorola Mobility to the Hong Kong-based Chinese technology company Lenovo for US$2.91 billion in a cash-and-stock deal, seeing the sale of $750 million in Lenovo shares to Google. Google retained the Advanced Technologies & Projects unit (which was integrated into the main Android team), and all but 2000 of the company's patents. Lenovo had prominently disclosed its intent to enter the U.S. smartphone market, and had previously expressed interest in acquiring BlackBerry, but was reportedly blocked by the Canadian government due to national security concerns. The acquisition was completed on October 30, 2014. The company remained headquartered in Chicago, and continued to use the Motorola brand, while Liu Jun (刘军) — president of Lenovo's mobile device business, became the company's chairman.

On January 26, 2015, owing to its new ownership, Motorola Mobility re-launched its product line in China with the local release of the second-generation Moto X, and an upcoming release of the Moto G LTE and Moto X Pro (a re-branded Nexus 6) in time for the Chinese New Year.

Lenovo maintained a "hands-off" approach in regards to Motorola Mobility's product development. Head designer Jim Wicks explained that "Google had very little influence and Lenovo has been the same." The company continued to engage in practices it adopted under Google, such as the use of nearly "stock" Android, undercutting competitor's pricing while offering superior hardware (as further encouraged by Lenovo), and placing a larger focus on direct-to-consumer selling of unlocked phones in the US market (as opposed to carrier subsidized versions). On July 28, 2015, Motorola Mobility unveiled three new devices, and its first under Lenovo ownership—the third-generation Moto G, Moto X Play, and Moto X Style—in three separate events.

==== Integration with Lenovo ====
In August 2015, Lenovo announced that it would merge its existing smartphone division, including design, development, and manufacturing, into the Motorola Mobility unit. This resulted in a reduction in jobs. As a result of the change, Motorola Mobility became responsible for the development and production of its own "Moto" product line, as well as Lenovo's own "Vibe" range.

In January 2016, Lenovo announced that the "Motorola" name would be further downplayed in public usage in favor of the "Moto" brand. Motorola Mobility later clarified that the "Motorola" brand will continue to be used in product packaging and through its brand licensees. The company said that "the Motorola legacy is near and dear to us as product designers, engineers and Motorola [Mobility] employees, and clearly it's important to many of you who have had long relationships with us. We plan to continue it under our parent company, Lenovo."

In response to claims by a Lenovo executive that only high-end devices would be produced under the "Moto" name, with low-end devices being amalgamated into Lenovo's existing "Vibe" brand, Motorola Mobility clarified its plans and explained that it would continue to release low-end products under the Moto brand, including the popular Moto G and Moto E lines. Motorola Mobility stated that there would be overlap between the Vibe and Moto lines in some price points and territories, but that both brands would have different "identities" and experiences. Moto devices would be positioned as "innovative" and "trendsetting" products, and Vibe would be a "mass-market challenger brand".

In November 2016, it was reported that Lenovo would be branding all its future smartphones under the brand "Moto by Lenovo". In March 2017, it was reported that Lenovo would continue to use the "Motorola" brand and logo, citing its recognition as a heritage cellphone brand. Furthermore, Aymar de Lencquesaing, Motorola Mobility's president at the time, stated that Lenovo planned to phase out its self-branded smartphones in favor of the Motorola brand.

=== 2020s ===
Under Lenovo, Motorola Mobility has faced criticism for having an increasingly poor commitment to maintaining Android software updates for its devices, exemplified by negative responses to a 2019 announcement that Android 9.0 "Pie" updates to the Moto Z2 Force in the United States would only be available to the Verizon Wireless model.

In the early 2020s, Motorola Mobility managed to double its global smartphone shipments (2020–2024). During this period, its market share in the U.S. has increased from 4.8% to 11.2%. Its strongest market is Brazil where Motorola Mobility holds 31% market share in the mobile phone market as of 2024. In addition, Motorola Mobility also marks its return to Indonesia in February 2025, 7 years after it left the Indonesian market in 2018.

In March 2026, during Mobile World Congress, Motorola Mobility announced a "long-term" partnership with the Canadian nonprofit GrapheneOS Foundation to jointly engineer secure devices that meet GrapheneOS's extensive list of hardware and vendor support requirements. The first officially supported devices are expected to launch in 2027.

== Products ==
=== Independent era ===
==== Atrix 4G, Droid Bionic, XOOM, and Droid RAZR ====
On January 5, 2011, Motorola Mobility announced that the Atrix 4G and the Droid Bionic were headed to AT&T and Verizon, respectively, with expected release dates in Q1 of 2011. The Atrix was released on February 22 as the world's first phone with both a Dual-Core Processor and 1 GB of RAM. On February 24, two days after the release of Atrix, the company released Motorola Xoom, the world's first Android 3.0 tablet, and followed it up shortly afterwards with an update to make it the world's first Android 3.1 tablet.

In the fourth quarter of 2011, Motorola Mobility unveiled the Droid RAZR, the world's thinnest 4G LTE smartphone at that time at just 7.1 mm. The Droid Razr featured Kevlar backing, the same used in bulletproof vests, and a Gorilla Glass faceplate. The phone was very successful through Verizon Wireless, and many color variants were released. In addition, a Maxx version of the Droid RAZR with an extended battery was released at CES 2012. The Droid RAZR MAXX won CTIA's "Best Smartphone" award. The company also announced new products by late 2011 and early 2012 such as the Xoom 2 tablets, the motoACTV fitness watch with Android, and the Droid 4 with 4G LTE for Verizon Wireless.

Though Jha managed to restore some of the lost luster to Motorola Mobility, it struggled against Samsung and Apple. Even among Android manufacturers, Motorola Mobility had dropped behind Samsung, HTC, and LG in market share by the second quarter of 2011. This may have been due to the delay in releasing 4G LTE-capable devices, as well as setting the prices of its new products too high. Jha was replaced by Dennis Woodside as CEO by May 2012, when the Google acquisition was complete.

Motorola Mobility released the Droid RAZR HD and Droid RAZR MAXX HD as its 2012 flagship devices and a lower end RAZR M. They also released an Intel powered RAZR i. In early 2013, the RAZR D1 and D3 devices were released in Brazil.

=== Google era ===
==== Moto X (2013–2015) ====
In an August 2013 interview, Motorola Mobility's vice president of product management Lior Ron explained that the company will focus on the production of fewer products to focus on quality rather than quantity. Ron stated, "Our mandate from Google, from Larry, is really to innovate and take long-term bets. When you have that sort of mentality, it's about quality and not quantity".

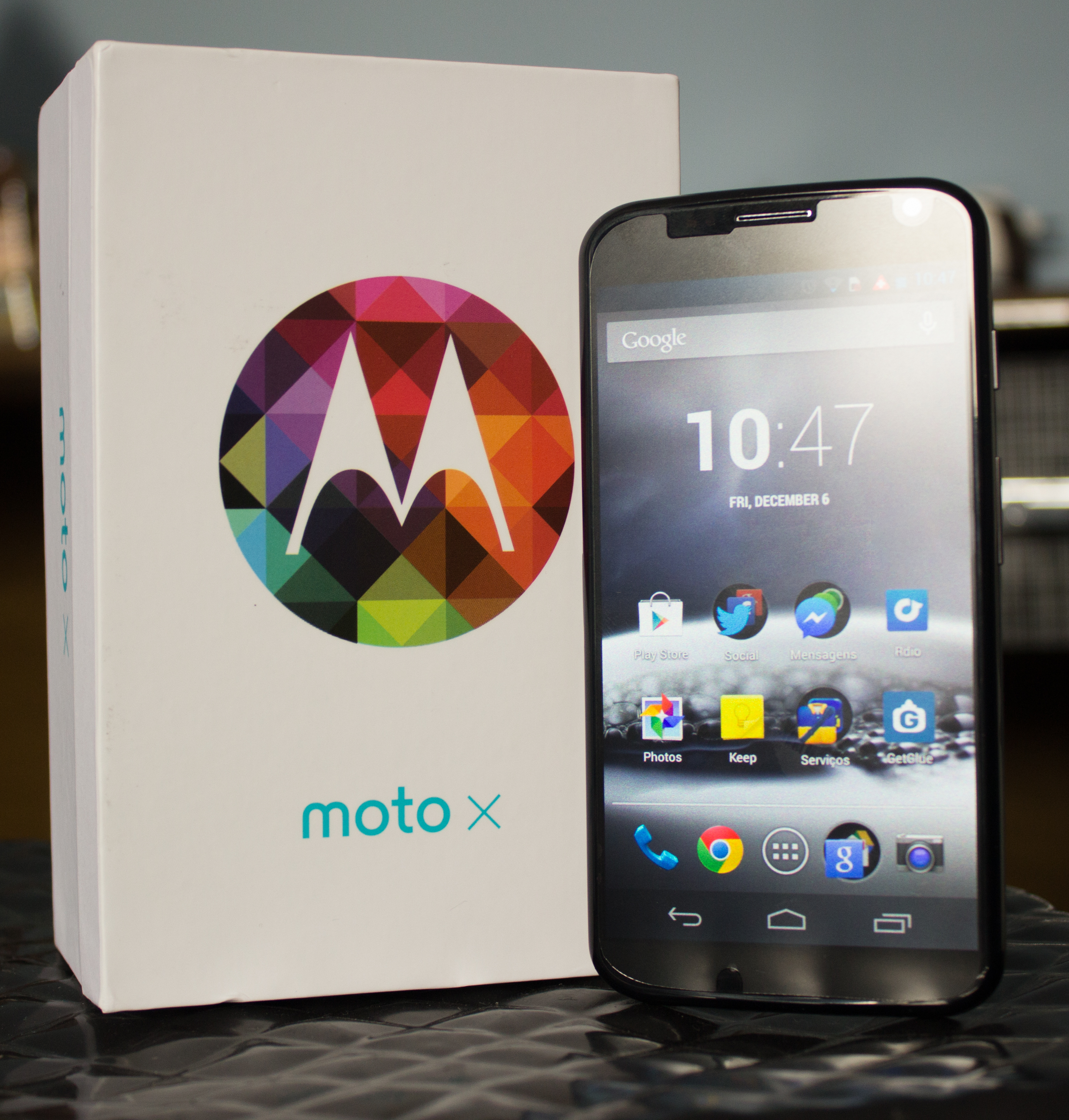
1st generation Moto X

Speaking at the D11 conference in Palos Verdes, California, in May 2013, Motorola Mobility CEO Dennis Woodside announced that a new mobile device would be built by his company at a 500,000 square-feet facility near Fort Worth, Texas, formerly used by Nokia. The facility will employ 2,000 people by August 2013 and the new phone, to be named "Moto X", will be available to the public in October 2013. The Moto X featured Google Now software, and an array of sensors and two microprocessors that will mean that users can “interact with [the phone] in very different ways than you can with other devices”. Media reports suggested that the phone will be able to activate functions preemptively based on an "awareness" of what the user is doing at any given moment.

On July 3, 2013, Motorola Mobility released a full-page color advertisement in many prominent newspapers across the US. It claimed that Motorola Mobility's next flagship phone will be "the first smartphone designed, engineered, and assembled in the United States". On the same day that the advertisement was published, ABC News reported that customers will be able to choose the color of the phone, as well as add custom engravings and wallpaper at the time of purchase.

In early July 2013, the Wall Street Journal reported that Motorola Mobility would spend nearly US$500 million on global advertising and marketing for the device. The amount is equivalent to half of Apple's total advertising budget for 2012.

On August 1, 2013, Motorola Mobility unveiled the first-generation Moto X smartphone. It was released on August 23, 2013, in the US and Canada.

On September 5, 2014, Motorola Mobility released the second-generation Moto X. This continued the trend of the company letting consumers customize their devices through their Moto Maker website, and added new customization options like additional real wood choices and new leather options. The device also got many increases in specs. With a new 5.2-inch (13 cm) 1080p super AMOLED pentile display, a faster 2.5 GHz Qualcomm Snapdragon 801 processor, and an improved 13-megapixel rear camera capable of recording 4k resolution video with a dual LED flash. The device also came with new software features along with new infrared proximity sensors.

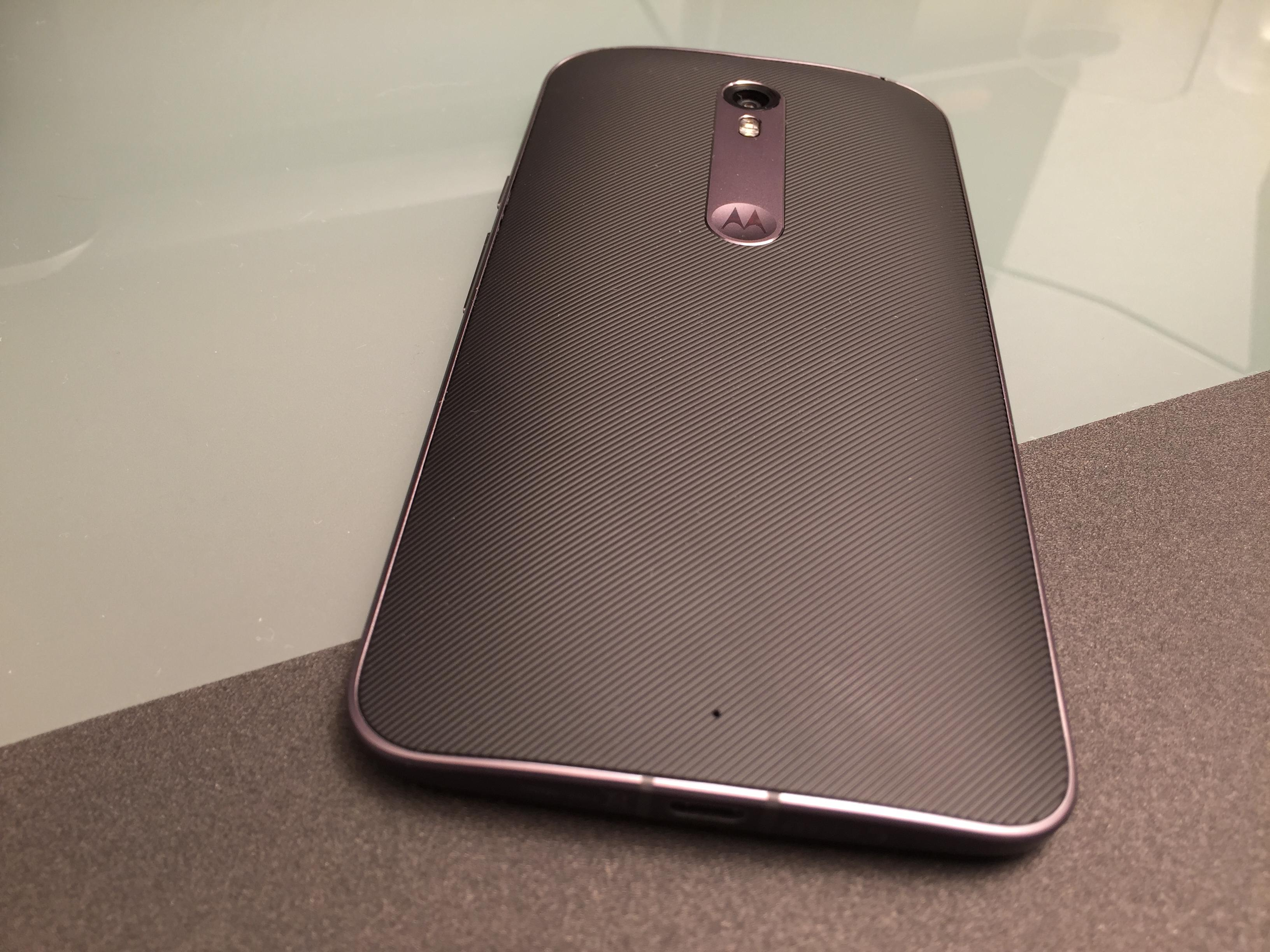
Moto X Style

The Moto X Play and Moto X Style smartphones were announced in July 2015, and were released in September 2015.

The Moto X Force was launched on October 27, 2015. In the US, it was branded as the Droid Turbo 2 and was Motorola Mobility's flagship device of the year, offering Snapdragon 810 processor and 3 GB of memory. Like other Moto X devices, it was customizable through Moto Maker. This was Motorola Mobility's first smartphone that featured the company's "ShatterShield" technology, which consists of two touchscreen elements, reinforced by an internal aluminum frame to make it resistant to bending and cracking, although this does not protect against scratches or other superficial screen damage. The top layer of the display is designed to be user-replaceable. The screen and case also have a water repellent nanocoating to protect the device from liquids that could damage internal components.

The Moto X4 was introduced in August 2017. It featured a 5.2-inch 1080p IPS display compared to Moto X 2014, and 3, 4, or 6 GB of RAM depending on versions. There were three iterations: a retail one from Motorola Mobility, an Android One version from Google, and an Amazon Prime edition. Unlike its predecessors, the Moto X4 did not offer some older Moto X exclusive features such as the Moto Maker. The phone came with Android Nougat 7.1.1 and Moto features, with support of 'A/B Partitions' and 'seamless update'. It was updated to Android Oreo in late 2017 and Android Pie in 2018. It was succeeded by the Motorola One lineup since 2018.

==== Droid Mini, Ultra and Maxx ====
Droid Mini, Droid Ultra and Droid Maxx were announced in a Verizon press conference on July 23, 2013. These phones share similar design with the predecessing Droid Razr HD lines in different screen and battery sizes, while all featuring the same Motorola X8 Mobile Computing System as the first-generation Moto X, with exclusive features like Motorola Active Notifications and 'OK Google' on device neural-based voice recognition system.

In September 2015, Droid Maxx 2 were launched as Verizon exclusives in the US market, which share the same overall design as the Moto X Style, with Verizon software on board. Unlike its Moto X counterpart, Droid Maxx 2 did not support Moto Maker for customization.

==== Moto G ====
On November 13, 2013, Motorola Mobility unveiled the first generation Moto G, a relatively low-cost smartphone. The Moto G had been launched in several markets, including the UK, United States, France, Germany, India and parts of Latin America and Asia. The Moto G was available in the United States, unlocked, for a starting price of US$179. The device is geared toward global markets and some US models support 4G LTE. Unlike the Moto X, the Moto G was not manufactured in the United States.

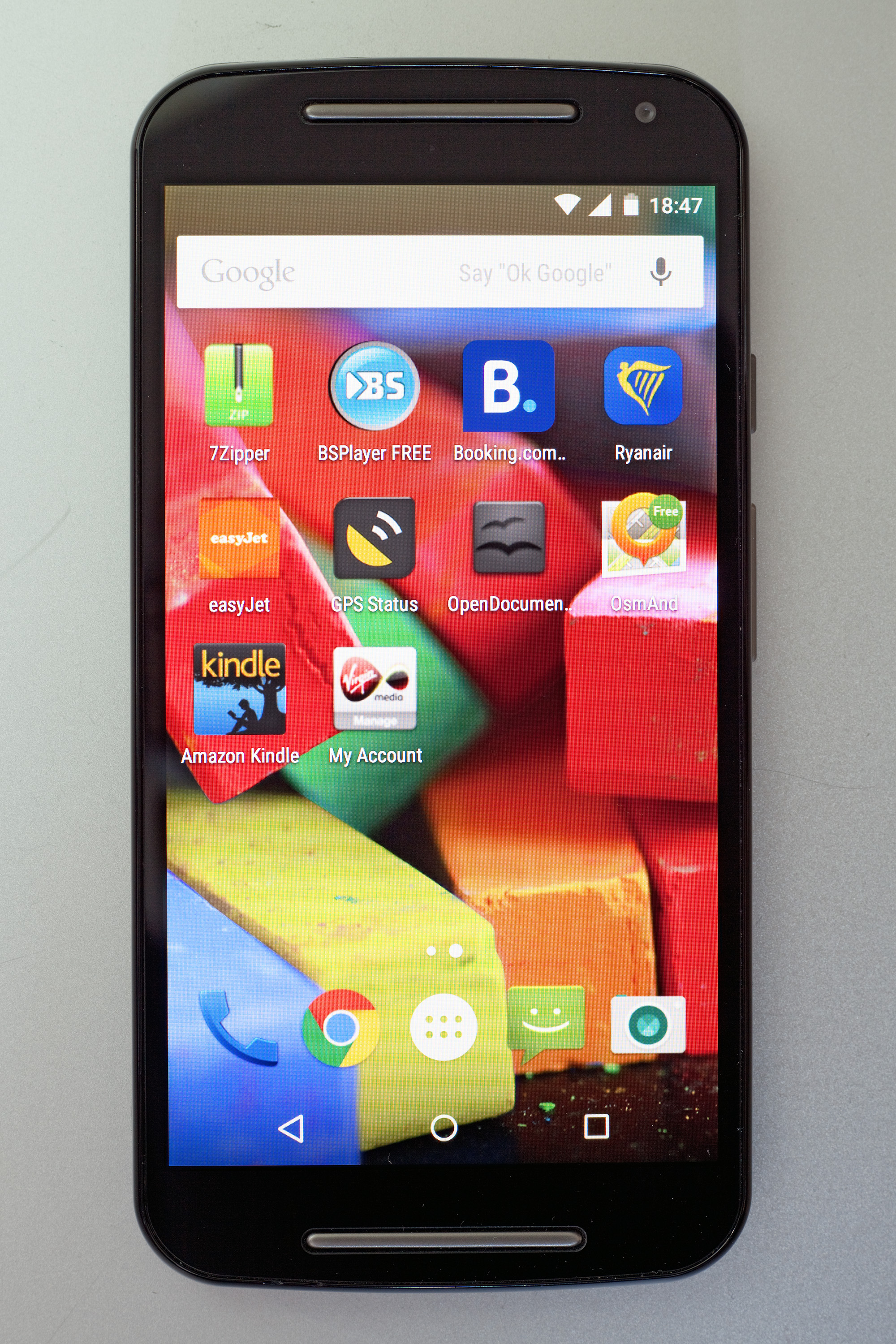
2nd generation Moto G

On September 5, 2014, Motorola Mobility released its successor to the 2013 version of the Moto G, called the Moto G (2nd generation). It came with a larger screen, higher resolution camera, along with dual front-facing stereo speakers.

On July 28, 2015, Motorola Mobility released the third generation of the Moto G series, called the Moto G (3rd generation), in a worldwide press conference in New Delhi, India. It retained the same screen as before but upgraded the processor and RAM. Furthermore, it has an IPx7 water-resistance certification and comes into two variants – one with 1 GB of memory and 8 GB of storage, and the other with 2 GB of memory and 16 GB of storage. The device launched with Android version 5.1.1.

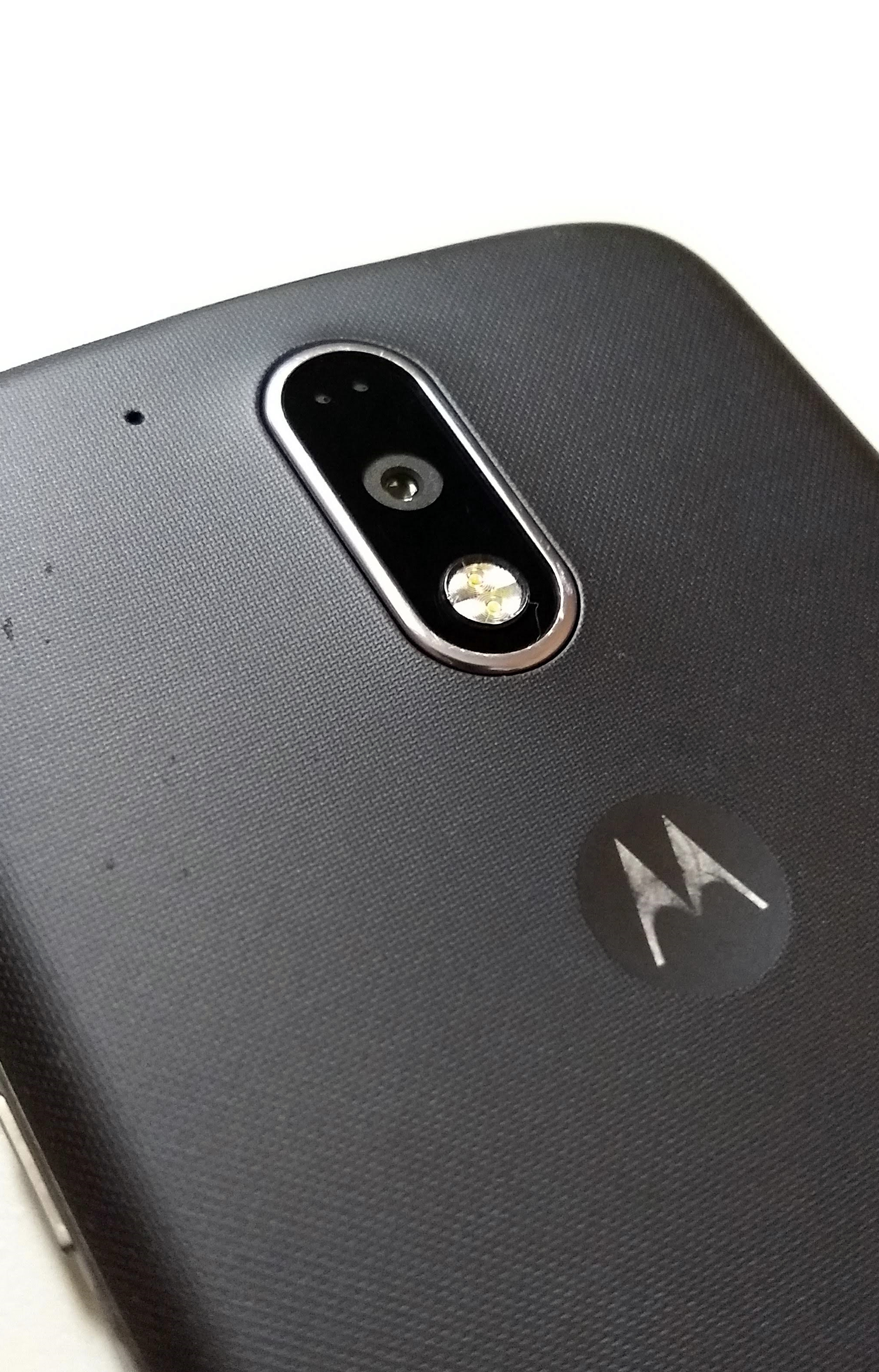
Moto G4 Plus

In May 2016, Motorola Mobility released three fourth generation Moto G smartphones: Moto G⁴, Moto G⁴ Plus, and Moto G⁴ Play.

On February 26, 2017, Motorola Mobility released two fifth generation Moto G smartphones during Mobile World Congress: Moto G^{5} and Moto G^{5} Plus. The company added two 'special edition' models to the Moto G lineup, the Moto G^{5S} and Moto G^{5S} Plus, on August 1.

In May 2018, Motorola Mobility released the sixth generation of the Moto G lineup in three variants, the G6, G6 Plus and the G6 Play. The G6 and G6 Plus have two rear cameras, and a larger screen with an aspect ratio of 18:9. The G6 Plus is capable of taking 4K video. The specification ranges from 3/32 GB to 6/128 GB.

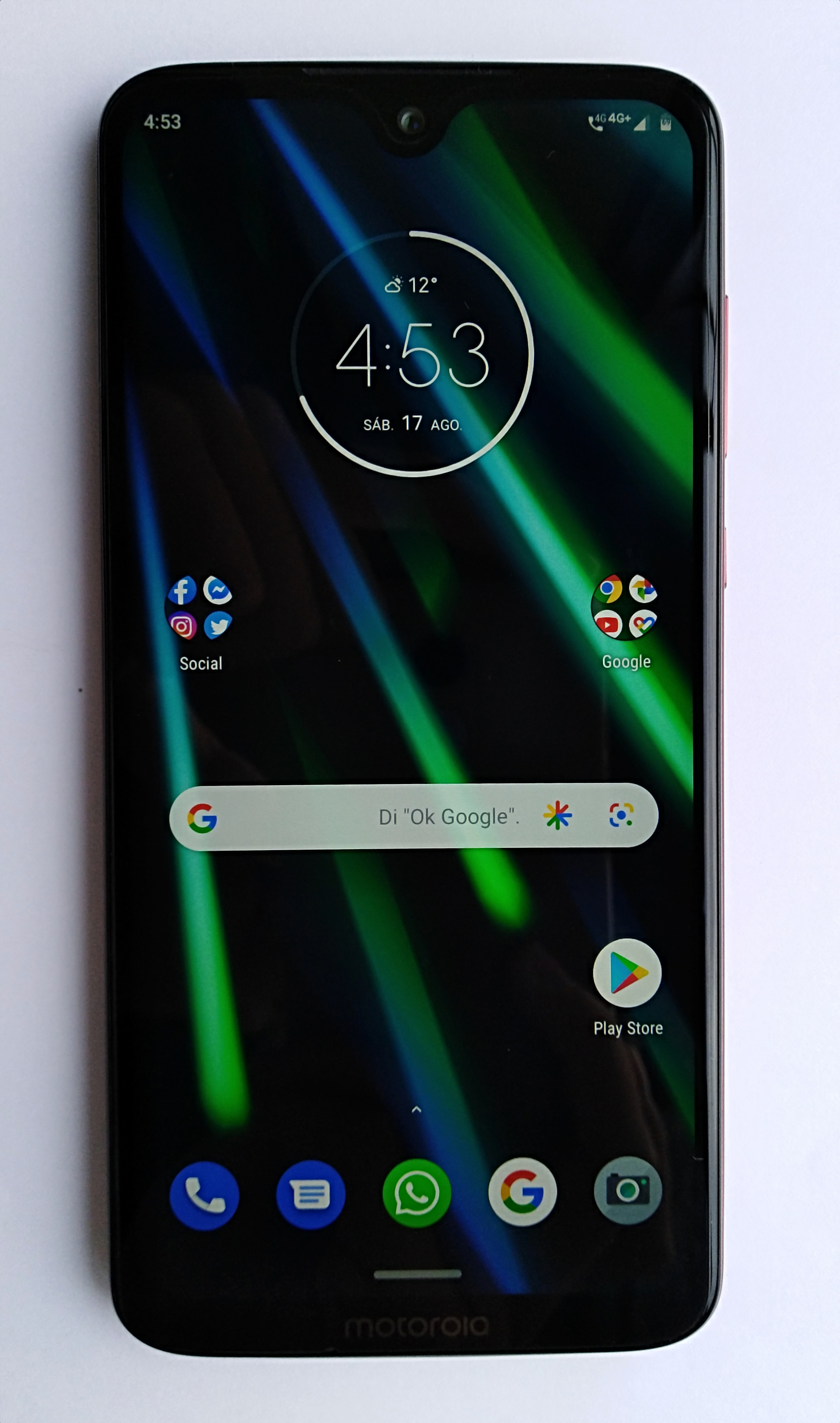
Moto G7 Plus

In February 2019, Motorola Mobility launched the Moto G7 with 3 extra variants, the Moto G7 Play, Moto G7 Power and the Moto G7 Plus.

==== Moto E ====
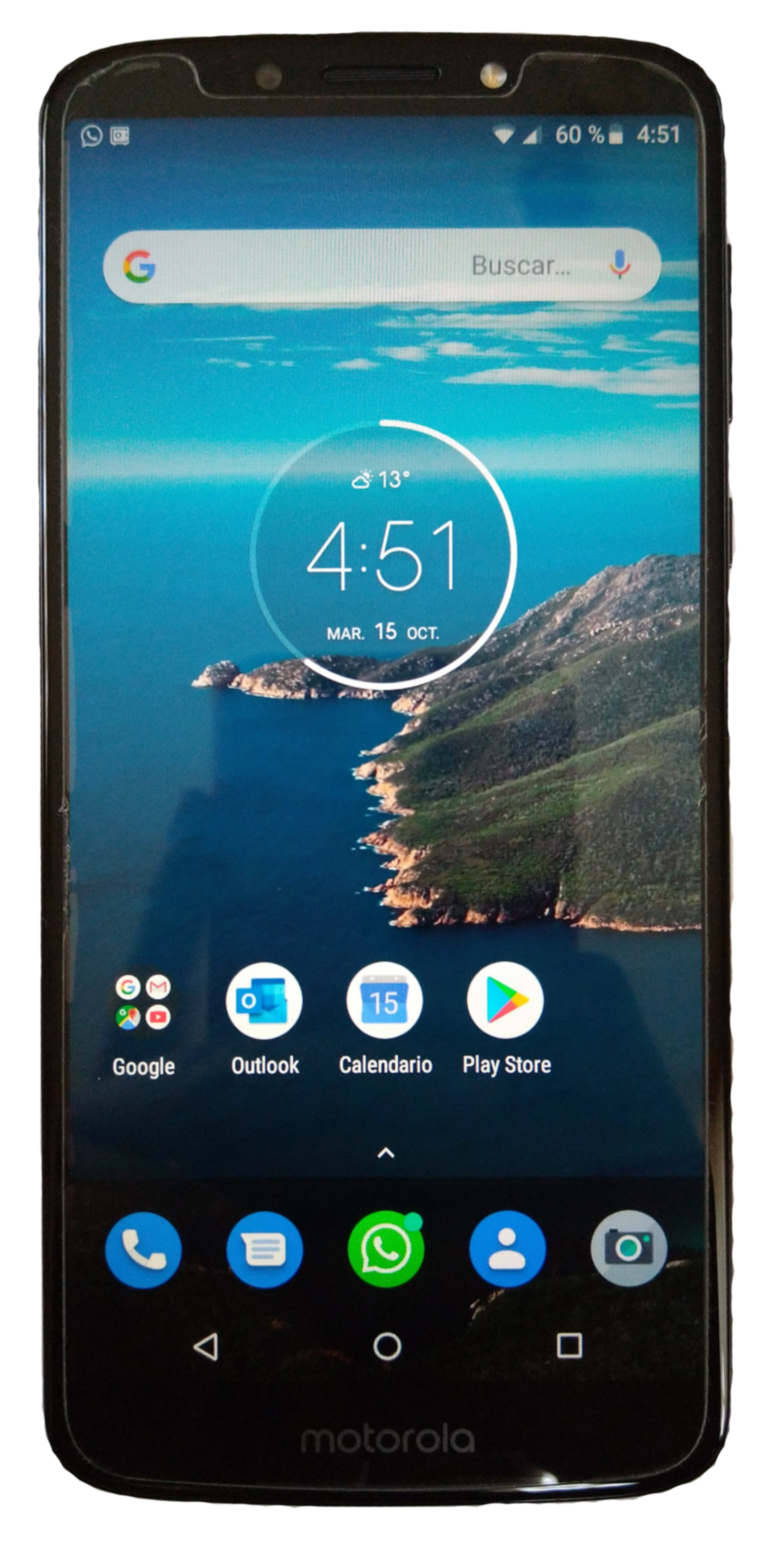
Moto E5 Plus

The Moto E (1st generation) was announced and launched on May 13, 2014. It was an entry-level device intended to compete against feature phones by providing a durable, low-cost device for first-time smartphone owners or budget-minded consumers, with a particular emphasis on emerging markets. The Moto E shipped with a stock version of Android 4.4 "KitKat".

The Moto E (2nd generation) was announced and launched on March 10, 2015, in India. Released in the wake of its successful first generation, the second generation of the Moto E series still aims to provide a smooth experience to budget-oriented consumers. It increased the screen size to 4.5 inches but kept the resolution at 540 × 960px. It came in two versions, a 3G-only one powered by a Snapdragon 200 chipset and a 4G LTE version powered by a Snapdragon 410 chipset. As before, it shipped with a stock version of Android 5.0 "Lollipop".

In 2015 Motorola Mobility marketed the 2nd generation Moto E with the promise of continual updates and support, "And while other smartphones in this category don't always support upgrades, we won't forget about you, and we'll make sure your Moto E stays up to date after you buy it." However, 219 days after launch Motorola announced that the device would not receive an upgrade from Lollipop to 6.0 "Marshmallow". It was later announced that the LTE variant of the device would receive an upgrade to Marshmallow in Canada, Europe, Latin America, and Asia (excluding China). China and the US carrier-branded versions of the device remained on Lollipop, with a minor upgrade to version 5.1. However, the 2nd generation Moto E in the USA did continue to receive support via Android Security Patch updates until at least the October 1, 2016 patch for the LTE variant and the November 1, 2016 patch for the non-LTE variant.

==== Google Nexus 6 / Moto X Pro ====
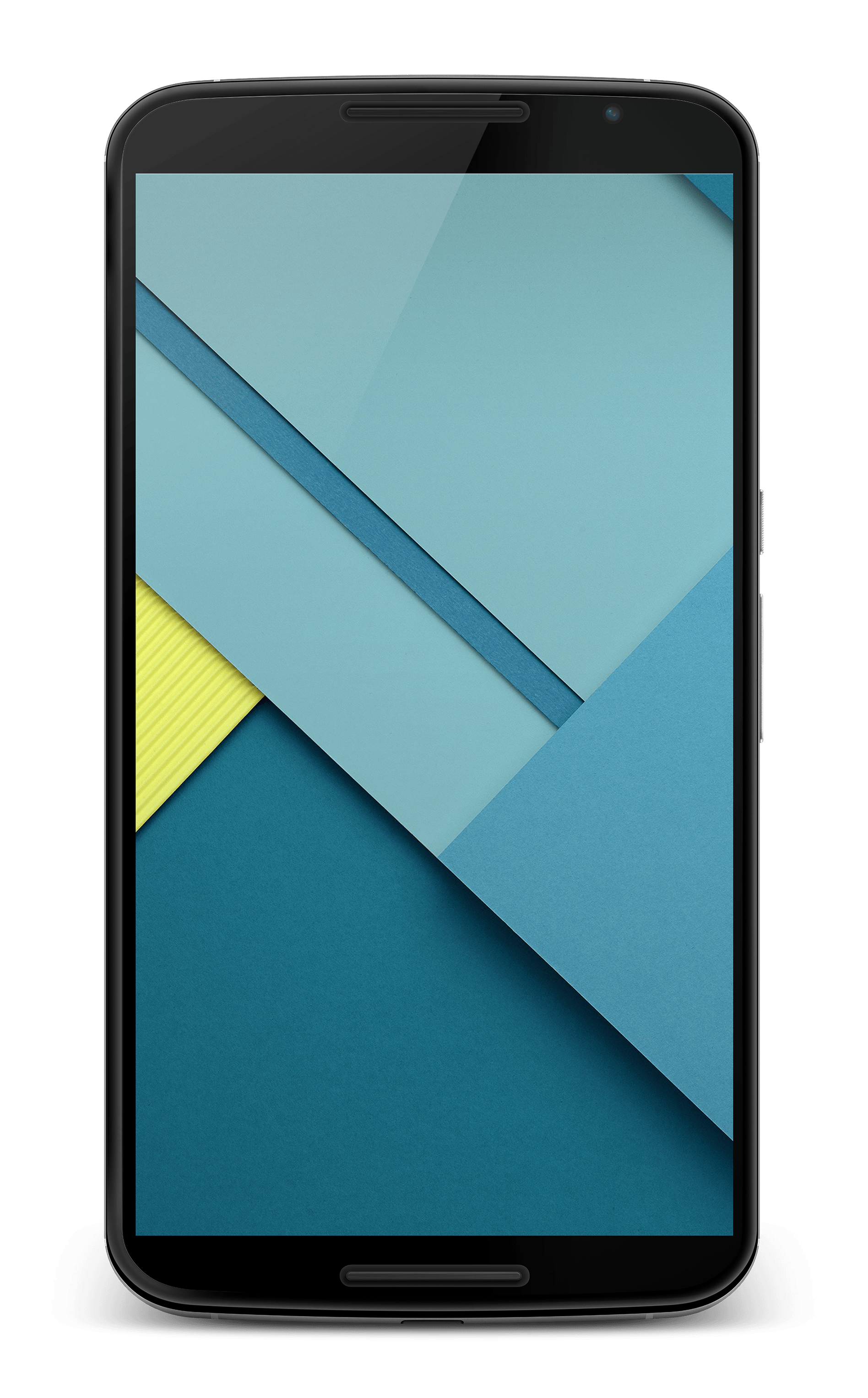
Nexus 6

The Nexus 6 was announced October 15, 2014 by Motorola Mobility in partnership with Google. It was the first 6-inch smartphone in the mainstream market, and came with many high-end specs. It was the successor to the Nexus 5, Google's previous flagship phone from their Google Nexus series of devices. Its design was similar to the Moto X (2nd generation) but with a larger display and dual, front-facing speakers rather than the single front-facing speaker on the Moto X. It was the first phone running vanilla Android Lollipop, receiving software updates directly from Google. It was later updated to Android Marshmallow in 2015 and Android Nougat in 2016, though later versions of Android 7.X took some time to arrive, and it never received Android 7.1.2 update, ending its support with Android 7.1.1 in the end of 2017.

On January 26, 2015, Motorola Mobility announced that they would sell the Moto X Pro in China. The Moto X Pro was similar to the Nexus 6 in terms of hardware, but excluded all of Google's services and applications. The phone was released in April 2015 with Android 5.0.2 'Lollipop'. However, it never received any Android version update throughout its lifetime despite the same hardware as the Nexus 6.

==== Droid Turbo / Moto Maxx / Moto Turbo ====
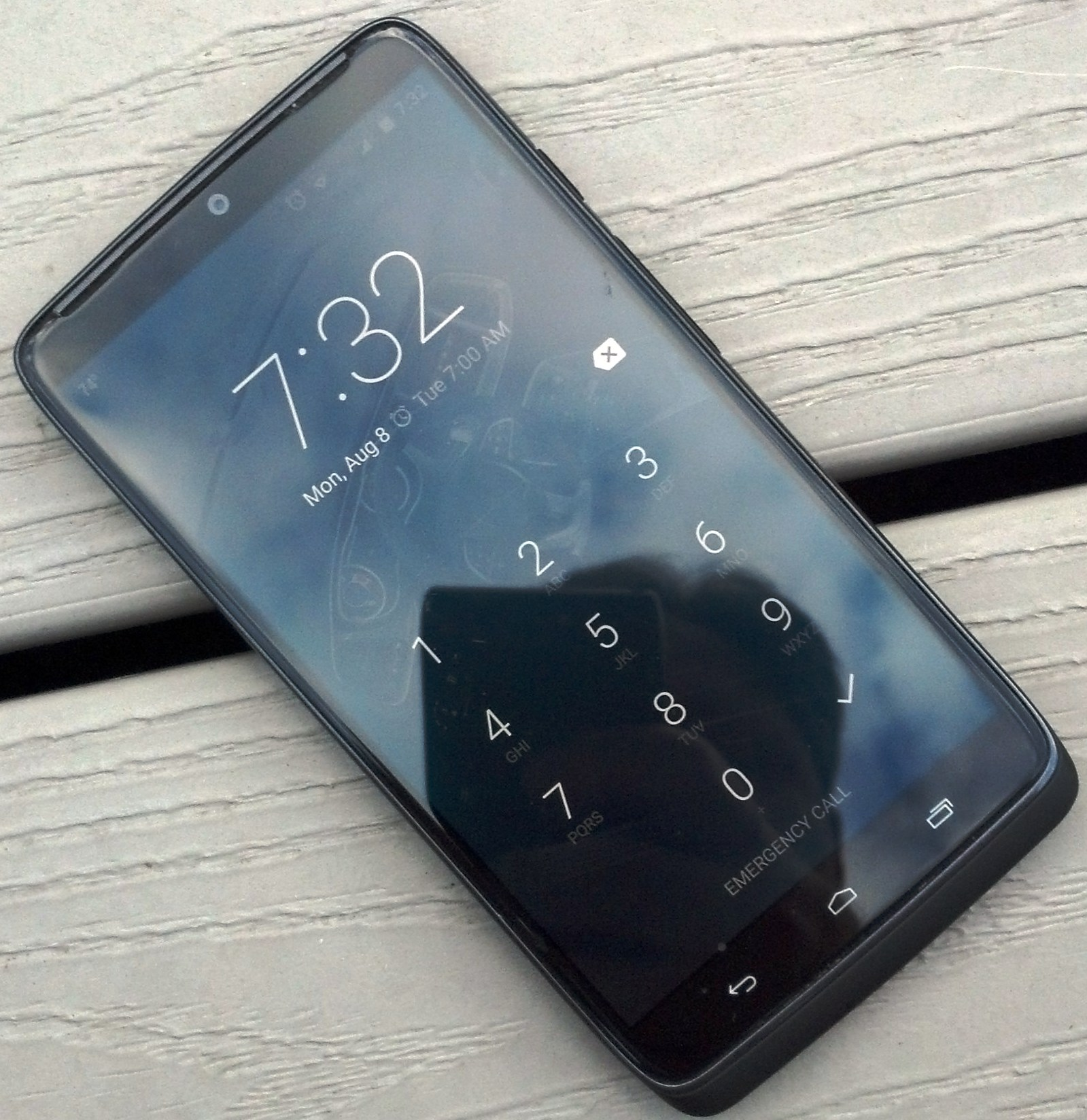
Droid Turbo

The Droid Turbo (Moto Maxx in South America and Mexico, Moto Turbo in India) features a 3900 mAh battery lasting up to two days. Motorola claims an additional eight hours of use after only fifteen minutes of charging with the included Turbo Charger. The device is finished in ballistic nylon over a Kevlar fiber layer and is protected by a water repellent nano-coating. Droid Turbo uses a quad-core Snapdragon 805 processor clocked at 2.7 GHz, 3 GB RAM, a 21-megapixel camera with 4K video, 5.2-inch screen with resolution of 2560 × 1440 pixels. The Droid Turbo includes 32 or 64 GB of internal storage, while the Moto Maxx is only available in 64 GB.

In late 2015, Droid Turbo 2 was introduced as a Verizon exclusive, which was a rebrand of Moto X Force. It was the first Droid device to offer Moto Mods for extensive customization, and ShatterShield display technologies.

=== Lenovo era ===
==== Moto Z and Moto Mods ====
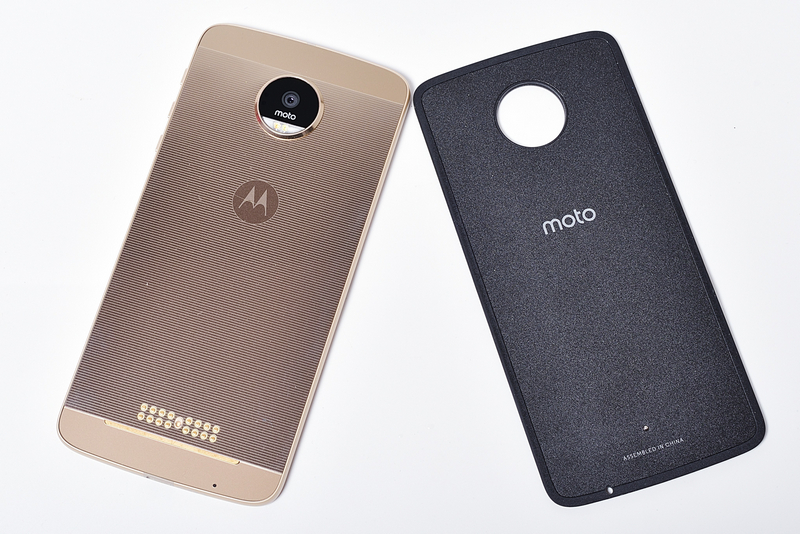
Moto Z 1st generation with Moto Style Shell

The Moto Z lineup was introduced in June 2016. The smartphone features Motorola Mobility's Moto Mods platform, in which the user can magnetically attach accessories or "Mods" to the back of the phone, including a projector, style shells, a Hasselblad-branded camera lens, and a JBL speaker. There were three versions of the original Moto Z. The global flagship model Moto Z, and Moto Z Droid as a Verizon exclusive, were introduced as the thinnest premium smartphone in the world, according to Motorola, and featured a 13-megapixel camera with 4K video, 5.5-inch screen and 4 GB of RAM. and an underclocked Snapdragon 820 chipset at 1.8 GHz, but was able to unlock with root permission granted. Moto Z Play, on the other hand, featured a less powerful processor and a bigger battery. Moto Z Force Droid, only introduced as a Verizon exclusive, featured the Snapdragon 820 chipset with standard frequency, a display with Motorola ShatterShield technology and a 21-megapixel camera. These phones ship with near stock Android 6.0 'Marshmallow' with usual Moto experiences. They were later updated to Android Nougat and Android Oreo in early 2017 and 2018, a substantial delay compared to older Moto X models.

Moto Z2 Play was launched in June 2017 with updated Moto experience, a slightly faster processor than Moto Z Play, and Android Nougat. Moto Z2 Force was launched in July 2017, and was the last Motorola flagship phone with up-to-date processor as for now. It was the first non-Google phone to feature 'A/B partition' and 'seamless update' features of Android Nougat, allowing users to install update in the background and finish with just a restart. It was updated to Android Oreo in the end of 2017, which was fairly speedy compared to other Android OEMs. In China, the phones run ZUI from ZUK, a subsidiary of Lenovo instead of near stock Android, and Moto Z2 Force was rebranded as 'Moto Z 2018'. There were also several Moto Mods released in 2017, including a Motorola TurboPower Moto Mod with fast charging capabilities.

The Moto Z3 lineup was released in August 2018, consisting of Moto Z3 Play with Snapdragon 6-series SoC and Moto Z3 with last generation 8-series SoC, both supporting all Moto Mods introduced. The 5G Moto Mod was introduced alongside the Moto Z3 lineup, and was a Verizon exclusive at launch in early 2019. It enables 5G connectivity for Moto Z2 Force and later Moto Z devices when the mod is attached on the phone. The phones launched with Android Oreo and was later updated to Android Pie with a similar software experience as earlier Moto Z devices.

The Moto Z4 was launched in May 2019 with a 48-megapixel camera sensor and enhanced night sight features, as well as an intergraded fingerprint sensor. It featured a Snapdragon 675 SoC, 4 GB of memory, and launched with Android Pie. Unlike older Moto Z models, this phone was focused on upper mid-range market, and came with a Moto 360 Camera Mod in the box.

==== Moto M ====
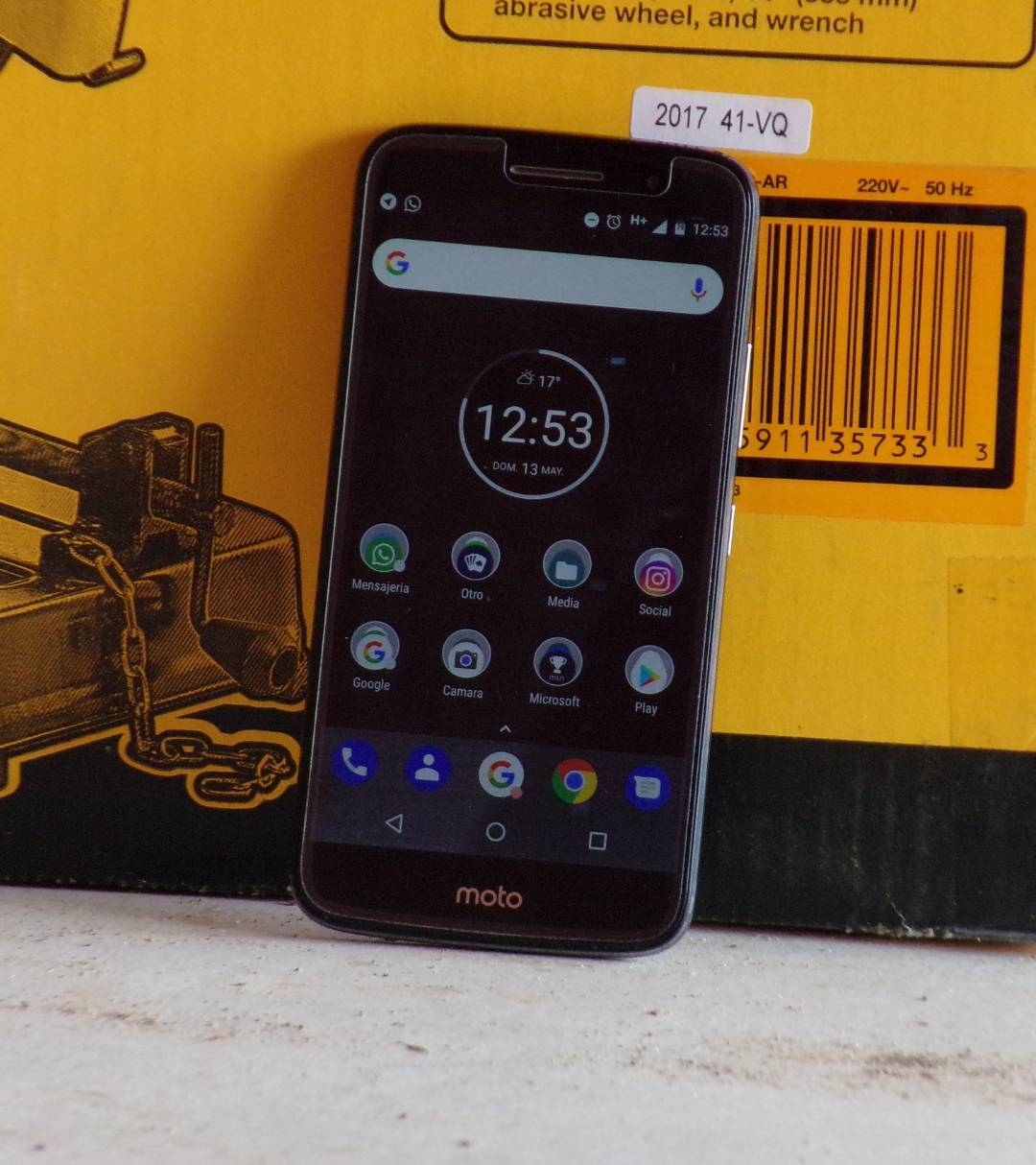
Moto M

The Moto M was introduced in late 2016. It was a mid-range device launched in markets such as mainland China and Hong Kong, Southeast Asia, and South Asia. It featured a MediaTek Helio P10 SoC and 3 or 4 GB of memory depending on storage, and ran near-stock Android. Despite the Moto branding, the bootloader and software update software came from Lenovo directly instead of Motorola Mobility, similar to the Moto E3 Power.

==== Moto C ====
The Moto C was announced in 2017 as a low-end device, slotting in below the Moto E as the cheapest in the Moto range. The base model includes a 5-inch display, MediaTek MT6737M SoC, 1 GB of memory, a 5-megapixel rear-facing camera, and an LED flash for the front-facing camera. It is accompanied by a higher-end model, the Moto C Plus, which features a more powerful processor, larger battery, 8-megapixel camera, and a 720p display.

==== Motorola One lineup ====
In 2018, Motorola Mobility launched the Motorola One lineup as upper mid-range replacements for the Moto X4. In August 2018, the first phones in the lineup, the Motorola One and Motorola One Power were launched. Both phones featured dual camera setup, displays with 'notches' for sensors and front-facing camera, and they were all in the Android One program by Google, with guaranteed three-year security updates. The phones launched with Android Oreo 8.1, and were later updated to Android Pie and Android 10 at the end of 2018 and 2019, respectively.

Motorola One Vision and Motorola One Action were introduced in May and August 2019. These devices all feature Samsung Exynos processors. Moto One Vision featured dual camera setup, with the main shooter being 48-megapixel. It featured a 'hole punch' display for front camera, and 27 W TurboPower fast charging. The Motorola One Action featured a triple camera setup with an ultra-wide lens. Both phones were a part of Android One program by Google. They launched with Android Pie, and were updated to Android 10 in early January 2020.

==== Motorola Razr (2020) ====
The Razr is the first foldable smartphone from Motorola Mobility, utilizing a similar design as the original Razr. It was introduced in November 2019 and was expected to launch in 2020. It featured mid-range Snapdragon 7-series SoC and Android Pie, with promised updates to Android 10 in 2020.

==== Motorola Edge & Edge+ ====
The Motorola Edge and Motorola Edge+ were introduced in April 2020. The Edge uses the Snapdragon 765G, while the Edge+ uses the Snapdragon 865; both feature Android 10.0, standard 5G and a curved 90 Hz OLED display. The Edge+ was the first Motorola phone to use a 108-megapixel sensor for the main camera with 6K video recording, and marked a return to flagship devices for Motorola Mobility.

==== ThinkPhone ====
The ThinkPhone is an Android-based smartphone that includes similar features to Lenovo's enterprise devices targeted at businesses, but is available for personal customers too. It was announced in January 2023 and is still in production. The device includes Lenovo's ThinkShield security platform. It is compatible with Android Enterprise management tools (MDM's) and the company highlighted the phone's cybersecurity features.

=== Smartwatches ===
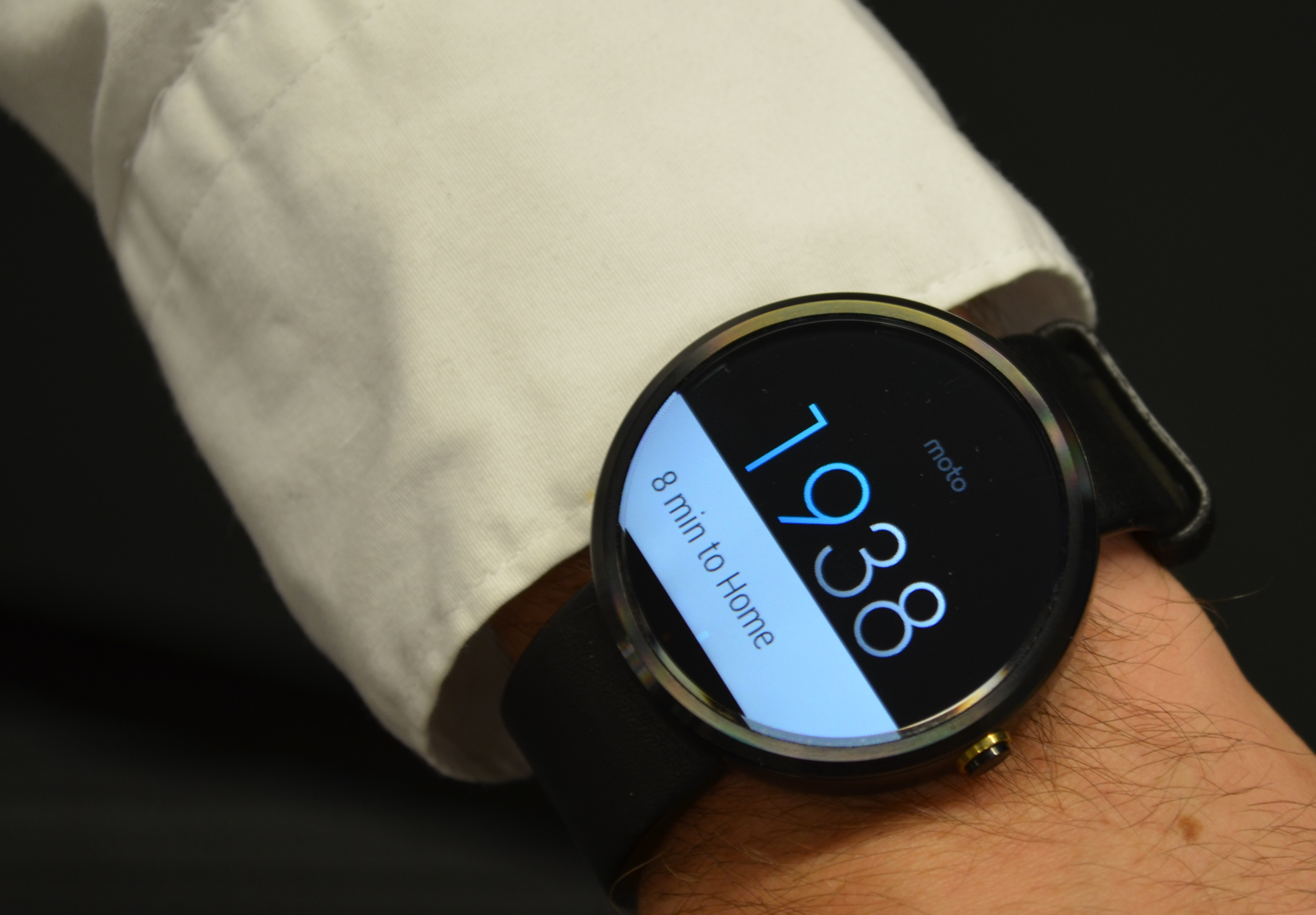
First generation Moto 360

==== Motoactv ====
Motoactv is a square smartwatch running Android 2.3 released by Motorola Mobility in 2011. It contained a number of hardware features and software applications tailored to fitness training.

==== Moto 360 ====
Moto 360 is a round smartwatch, powered by Google's Android Wear OS, a version of Google's popular Android mobile platform specifically designed for the wearable market. It integrates Google Now and pairs to an Android 4.3 or above smartphone for notifications and control over various features. The second version of this smartwatch was released in 2015.

==== MINNIDIP x RAZR CH(AIR) ====
In August 2020, the MINNIDIP x RAZR CH(AIR) was announced by Motorola Mobility.

=== Tablets ===
Motorola Mobility have also made tablet computers, starting with the Motorola Xoom and its successor Motorola Xyboard, in 2011. After acquisition, there were no Motorola tablets other than the one-off AT&T-exclusive Moto Tab in 2017, itself a Lenovo-rebranded product, until 2021's introduction of Moto Tab G20, a rebranded product exclusively for the Indian market. Since then other Lenovo-designed rebranded Motorola tablets have been marketed in regions like India and Brazil, and in 2026 the Moto Pad marked the first Motorola tablet released in the United States in a while, although again unlike Motorola smartphones these are instead rebranded Lenovo products designed in China.

== Software ==
Smartphones, which make up the core product range of Motorola Mobility, are preloaded with the Android operating system and Google Mobile Services. They use a software interface called Hello UI which the company introduced in 2024 replacing an older skin called My UX with an updated bespoke design featuring modern translucency and blur effects, enhanced lock screen and control panel customization, full integration of the Moto Secure security subsystem, the Smart Connect cross-device feature (co-developed with Lenovo, itself a Microsoft Windows licensee) and Moto AI integrated artificial intelligence tools. Motorola otherwise does not build its own general usage and system apps, relying on Google's Pixel interface suite.

From 2011 to 2020, Motorola Android smartphones shipped with an unbranded skin that was near-identical to Google's but with a number of bespoke features such as Moto Display and physical gestures like Chop-Chop flashlight. Afterwards, My UX replaced it with its own default icons, additional customization features, and a central Moto app.

In March 2026, Motorola launched a partnership with GrapheneOS to support the hardened operating system on their phones. This ends the previously exclusive support for GrapheneOS by Google Pixel devices. The first devices expected to support GrapheneOS are the 2027 Motorola Razr Fold and Razr Fold Ultra folding phones, as well as the successor to the Motorola Signature.

== Brand licensing ==
The company has licensed its brand through the years to several companies and a variety of home products and mobile phone accessories have been released. Motorola Mobility created a dedicated "Motorola Home" website for these products, which sells corded and cordless phones, cable modems and routers, baby monitors, home monitoring systems and pet safety systems. In 2015, Motorola Mobility sold its brand rights for accessories to Binatone, which already was the official licensee for certain home products. This deal includes brand rights for all mobile and car accessories under the Motorola brand.

In 2016, Zoom Telephonics was granted the worldwide brand rights for home networking products, including cable modems, routers, Wi-Fi range extenders and related networking products.

== Sponsorship ==
Since 2021 Motorola is the main sponsor of the Milwaukee Bucks of the NBA From 2022, Motorola was the main kit sponsor of Italian football club AC Monza.

The Athletic reported on August 1, 2024, Motorola signed a multiyear long deal with the Chicago Cubs to have their logo placed on a uniform patch. The deal also made Motorola the "official smartphone" brand for the team.

In September 2024, Motorola became the global smartphone partner of Formula 1 from 2025 onwards, and in the following month Motorola also has inked the same deal with FIFA. Both were made as a part of Lenovo's partnership with Formula 1 and FIFA.

== Controversies ==
In December 2024, a class-action lawsuit alleging that Motorola Mobility LLC was still permitting third party cookies to track users that selected "Reject All non-essential cookies" button on the banner of Motorola's website. Third party tracking cookies included Google, Amazon, and TikTok.

In June 2026, customers using Premier LogiTech's Motorola-branded WiFi routers lost the ability to manage their devices after its cloud-based management platform became unreachable.

== See also ==
- iDEN
- WiDEN
- List of electronics brands
- List of Motorola products
- List of Illinois companies
- Motorola Moto
- Motorola Solutions
