= Resurrection Remix OS =

Android-based mobile operating system

- Written in: C (core), C++ (some third party libraries), Java (UI)
- OS family: Android (Linux)
- Working state: Inactive
- Source model: Open source with proprietary components
- Initial release: 2012; 14 years ago
- Latest release: 8.7.3 / 2021
- Repository: github.com/ResurrectionRemix
- Marketing target: Firmware replacement for Android mobile devices
- Update method: Over-the-air (OTA), ROM flashing
- Package manager: APK or Aptoide (if installed) or F-Droid FOSS Store (if installed) or Google Play Store (if installed)
- Supported platforms: ARM, ARM64
- Kernel type: Linux kernel
- Official website: resurrectionremix.com

Resurrection Remix OS, abbreviated as RR, is an unmaintained free and open-source operating system for smartphones and tablet computers, based on the Android mobile platform. UX designer and head developer Altan Krk & Varun Date started the project in 2012.

== History ==
On February 9, 2018, Resurrection Remix 6.0.0 was released, based on Android 8.1 Oreo after months in development. In early 2019 Resurrection Remix 7.0.0, 7.0.1 and 7.0.2 were released, based on Android 10. The project seemed abandoned after a disagreement between two major developers which caused one of them (Acar) to leave, but in mid-2020 Resurrection Remix came back with 8.5.7. As of May 2023 v8.7.3, based on Android 10, was current.

== Reviews and studies ==
A DroidViews review of Resurrection Remix OS called it "feature-packed," and complimented the large online community, updates, and customization options, as compared with the simplicity of Lineage OS. ZDNet stated Resurrection Remix OS was a custom ROM that could evade SafetyNet exclusions and display the Netflix app in Play Store.

Resurrection Remix OS was one of a few operating systems mentioned as Android upgrade options in Upcycled Technology. Resurrection Remix OS was one of a handful of operating systems supported by the OpenKirin development team for bringing pure Android to Huawei devices, and was one of two suggested for OnePlus 5.

In a 2017 detailed review, Stefanie Enge of Curved.de said Resurrection Remix combined the best of LineageOS, OmniROM and SlimRoms. The camera performance was criticized, however, extensive customization options, speed and lack of Google services were all acclaimed.

In a study of phone sensors, Resurrection Remix OS was one of six Android operating systems used on two Xiaomi devices to compare gyroscope, accelerometer, orientation and light sensor data to values recorded by accurate reference sensors.

== Supported devices ==
More than 150 devices are supported, some of which are:

	Product	codename	Release v6 (Android 8.0 Oreo)	Release v7 (Android 9.0 Pie)	Release v8 (Android 10)
Google	Nexus 5	hammerhead	x	x	
Google	Nexus 6P	angler	x	x	x
Google	Pixel	sailfish	x		x
Google	Pixel XL	marlin	x		x
Google	Pixel 2 XL	taimen	x		x
Google	Pixel 3 XL	crosshatch		x	x
ZTE	Blade A610	a610	x		
Motorola	Moto G3	osprey	x	x	x
Motorola	Moto G4	athene	x		
Motorola	Moto G5	potter	x	x	
Motorola	Moto G5s Plus	sanders	x	x	x
Motorola	Moto G6	ali	x	x	x
Motorola	Moto G6 Plus	evert		x	x
Motorola	Moto G7 Play	channel		x	x
OnePlus	One	bacon	x		x
OnePlus	2	oneplus2	x		
OnePlus	3 / 3T	oneplus3	x	x	x
OnePlus	5	cheeseburger	x		x
OnePlus	5T	dumpling	x	x	x
OnePlus	6	enchilada	x	x	x
OnePlus	6T	fajita			x
OnePlus	7 Pro	guacamole		x	x
OnePlus	7T	hotdogb			x
OnePlus	7T Pro	hotdog			x
Xiaomi	Poco F1	beryllium	x	x	x
Xiaomi	POCO X2	phoenixin / phoenix			x
Xiaomi	A1	tissot	x	x	x
Xiaomi	A2	jasmine		x	x
Xiaomi	S2/Y2	ysl			x
Xiaomi	Mi 3 / Mi 4	cancro	x		
Xiaomi	Mi 5	gemini	x	x	
Xiaomi	Mi 6	sagit	x	x	
Xiaomi	Mi 9T	davinci			x
Xiaomi	Redmi 4A	rolex	x	x	x
Xiaomi	Redmi 5 Plus	vince	x	x	x
Xiaomi	Redmi 5A	riva		x	x
Xiaomi	Redmi K20 Pro	raphael			x
Xiaomi	Redmi Note 3	kenzo	x	x	x
Xiaomi	Redmi Note 4X	mido	x	x	x
Xiaomi	Redmi Note 5	whyred	x	x	x
Xiaomi	Redmi Note 6 Pro	tulip	x	x	x
Xiaomi	Redmi Note 7	lavender		x	x
Xiaomi	Redmi Note 7 Pro	violet		x	x
Xiaomi	Redmi Note 8	ginkgo			x
Xiaomi	Redmi Note 8T	willow			x
Sony	Xperia ZR	dogo	x		
Samsung	S4	jfltexx	x		
Samsung	S4 Mini	serrano3gxx / serranodsdd / serranoltexx	x		
Samsung	S5 / S5 duos	klte	x	x	x
Samsung	S6	zerofltexx		x	
Samsung	S7 / S7 Edge	herolte		x	
Samsung	S8	dreamlte	x		
Samsung	S8+	dream2lte	x		
Samsung	S9	starlte	x		x
Samsung	S9+	star2lte	x		x
Samsung	Note 3	hlte		x	

== See also ==
- List of custom Android firmware
