= Moto E (2020) =

Android smartphone developed by Motorola Mobility

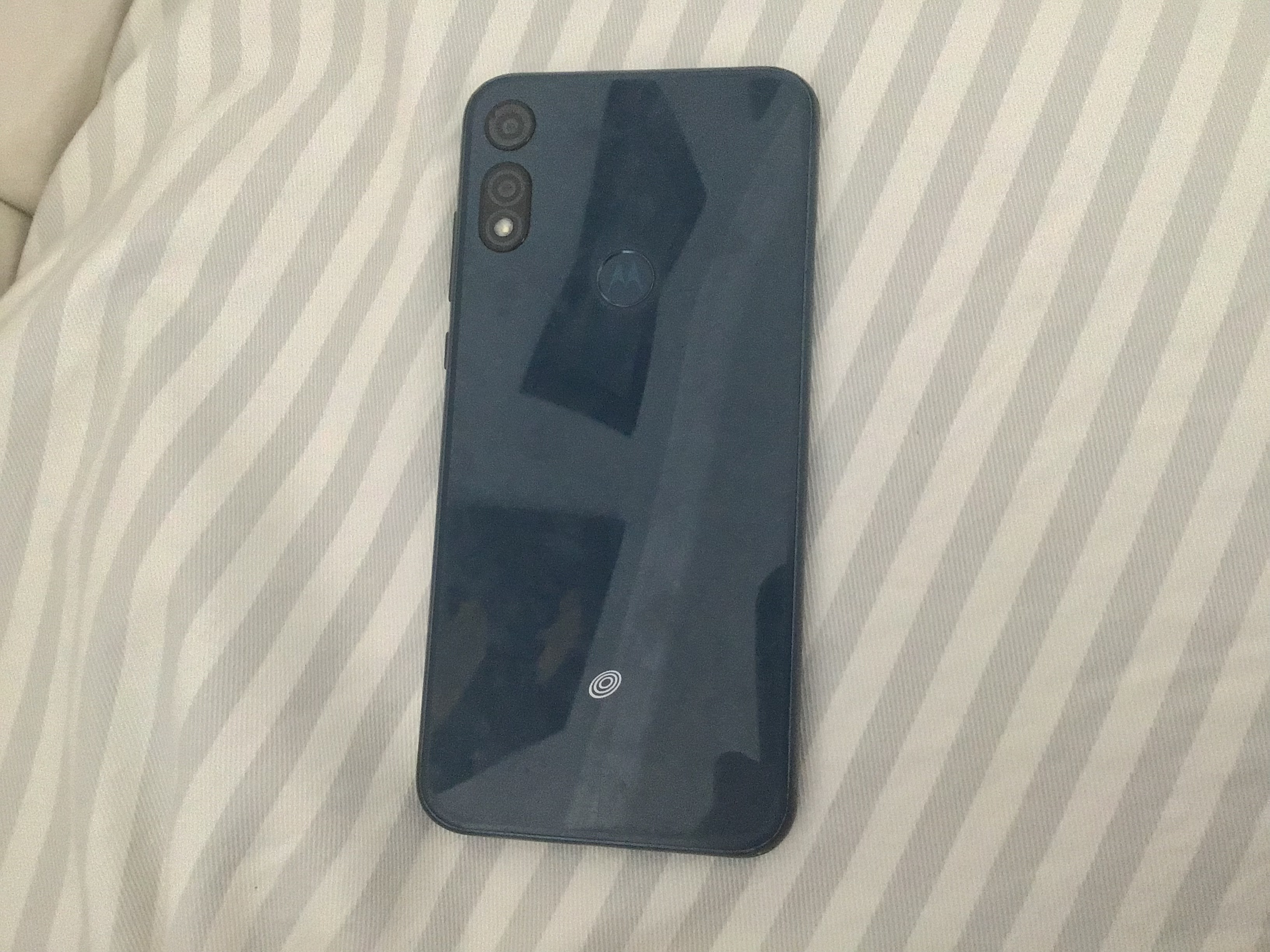
- Manufacturer: Motorola Mobility
- Type: Smartphone
- Series: Motorola E Family
- First released: 10 June 2020; 6 years ago
- Predecessor: Moto E6
- Related: Moto G Fast
- Compatible networks: 2G EDGE, GPRS/3G HSPA, HSPA+/4G LTE, LTE+
- Form factor: Slate
- Dimensions: 159.8 mm × 76.6 mm × 8.7 mm (6.29 in × 3.02 in × 0.34 in)
- Weight: 185 g (6.5 oz)
- Operating system: Android 10
- System-on-chip: Qualcomm SDM632 Snapdragon 632
- CPU: Octa-core, (4x Kryo 250 Gold & 4x Kryo 250 Silver)
- GPU: Adreno 506
- Memory: 2 GB
- Storage: 32 GB
- Removable storage: microSD, up to 512 GB
- Battery: 3550 mAh
- Rear camera: 13 MP, f/2.0, 1/3.1", 1.12µm (wide) + 2 MP, f/2.2 (depth), 1080p@30/60fps PDAF, LED flash, HDR, panorama
- Front camera: 5 MP, f/2.0, 1.12µm, 1080p@30fps, HDR
- Display: 6.2 in (157.5 mm) 1520 × 720 IPS LCD capacitive touchscreen, (271 PPI with 19:9 aspect ratio)
- Sound: Mono loudspeaker, 3.5mm audio jack
- Connectivity: Wi-Fi 802.11a/b/g/n Bluetooth 4.2 microUSB 2.0
- Data inputs: Fingerprint (rear-mounted), accelerometer, gyro, proximity, compass
- Model: XT2052
- Development status: discontinued
- Website: moto e

The Moto E (2020) is an Android smartphone part of the low-end Moto E family of Android smart phones developed by Motorola Mobility. It was presented on June 5, 2020, together with Moto G Fast.

== Design ==
The front is glass, while the back and frame are plastic.

Below are the micro USB connector, speaker, and microphone. At the top are the second microphone and the 3.5 mm audio jack. On the left side, there is a slot for 1 SIM card and a microSD memory card up to 512 GB. On the right side, there are volume buttons and a smartphone lock button. The fingerprint scanner is located on the back panel.

The only available color is Midnight Blue.

== Specifications ==
=== Hardware ===
The Moto E (2020) is powered by the Qualcomm Snapdragon 632 SoC. The device was sold with 2 GB RAM and 32 GB of internal storage, which can be expanded via a microSD card.

The device has a non-removable 3550 mAh battery.

The Moto E (2020) features a dual rear-facing camera setup consisting of a 13 MP wide-angle lens with autofocus and a 2 MP depth sensor. The rear cameras can record video at 1080p at 30 fps. The front camera uses a 5 MP sensor.

The device has a 6.2-inch IPS LCD 720p display with a HD+ (1520 × 720 pixels) resolution and a 19:9 aspect ratio, with a teardrop-shaped cutout for the front camera.

=== Software ===
The Moto E (2020) runs on Android 10.

== Reception ==
The reception is neutral, saying that it is good for the price and has good battery life. The criticism focuses mainly on the camera, display, the micro USB port (since most Android smartphones have moved to USB-C), and the lack of further software updates.

== Links ==
- Official Site
