= Moto G06 =

Motorola smartphone

- Manufacturer: Motorola
- Type: Smartphone
- Series: Moto G
- First released: September 23, 2025
- Weight: 194
- Operating system: Android 15
- System-on-chip: Mediatek Helio G81 Ultra
- CPU: Octa-core (2x2.0 GHz Cortex-A75 & 6x1.7 GHz Cortex-A55)
- GPU: Mali-G52 MC2
- Memory: 4GB, 8GB
- Storage: 64GB, 128GB, 256GB
- Removable storage: microSDXC
- Battery: 5200 mAh
- Rear camera: 50 MP, f/2.8, PDAF, OIS
- Front camera: 8 MP, f/2.0
- Display: 6.88" IPS LCD, 720 x 1640 pixels, 120Hz
- Sound: Stereo speakers

The Moto G06 is an entry-level smartphone developed by Motorola Mobility. Released on September 23, 2025, it is part of the Moto G series.

== Specifications ==
The Moto G06 features a 6.88-inch IPS LCD display with a resolution of 720 x 1640 pixels and a refresh rate of 120 Hz. It runs on Android 15 and is powered by a Mediatek Helio G81 Ultra, with an octa-core CPU and Mali-G52 MC2 GPU. The device comes with 4GB and 8GB RAM options, and 64GB, 128GB and 256GB of internal storage, expandable via microSDXC card. It houses a 5200 mAh battery and supports 10W wired charging.

== Camera ==
The Moto G06 is equipped with a dual-camera setup on the rear, featuring a 50 MP main sensor with f/2.0 aperture. It includes stereo speakers and support for Dolby Atmos technology.

== Reception ==
Upon release, the Moto G06 received mixed reviews because of its low price, battery life, and decent design. Although the performance isn't great, it doesn't support 5G or Wi-Fi 6, and the screen and resolution are mediocre.
