= Moto G54 5G =

Android smartphone by Motorola

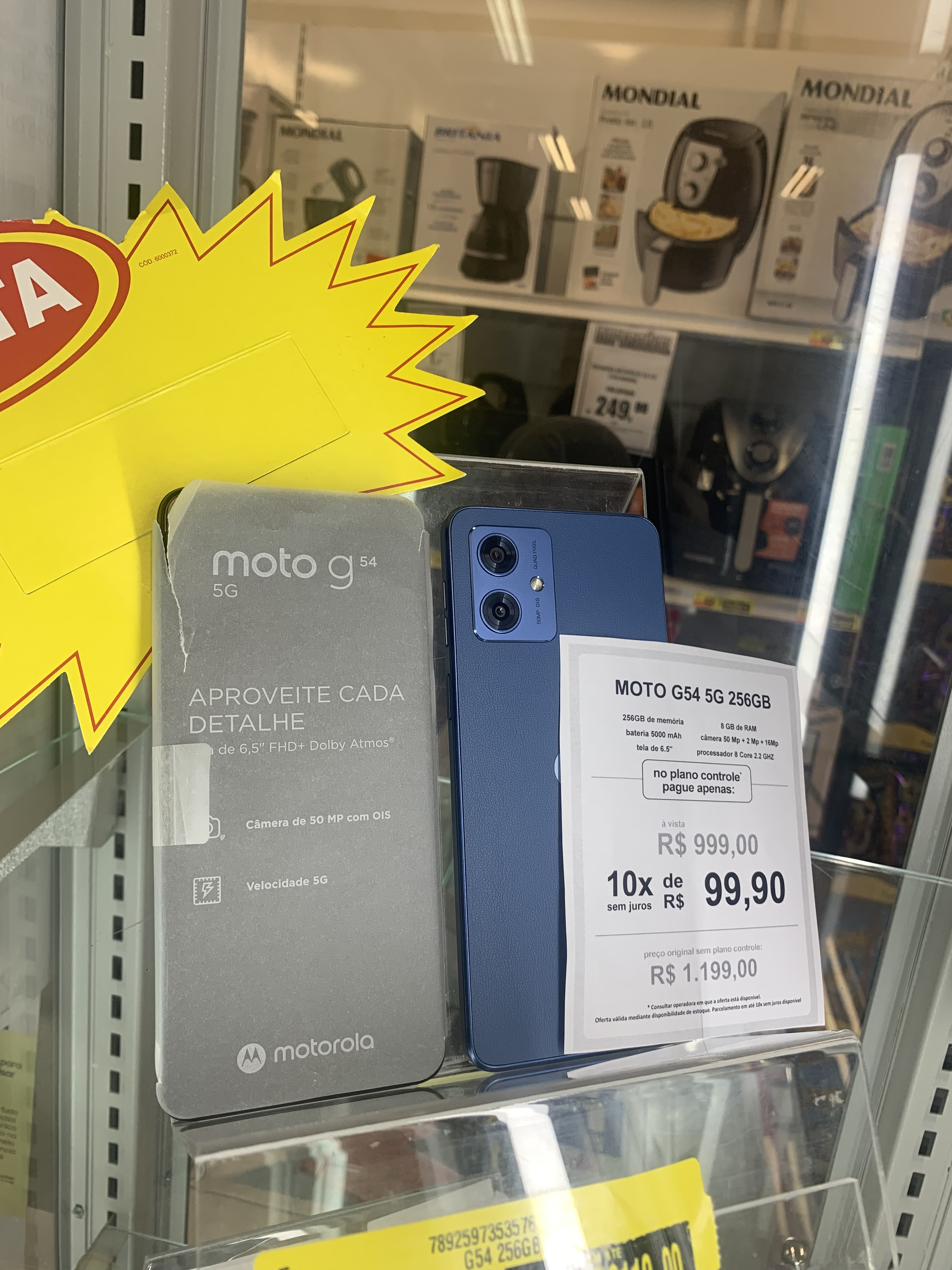
- Indigo Blue (eco-leather back) edition
- Manufacturer: Lenovo
- Type: Smartphone
- Series: Moto G
- First released: September 5, 2023
- Predecessor: Moto G53 5G
- Successor: Moto G55 5G
- Related: Moto G04; Moto G14; Moto G24; Moto G54 Power edition Moto G84 5G
- Compatible networks: GSM, HSPA, LTE, 5G
- Colors: Midnight blue, Glacier blue, Mint green, Indigo Blue (vegan leather back)
- Dimensions: 161.6 mm × 73.8 mm × 8 mm
- Weight: 177 g (6 oz)
- Operating system: Original: Android 13; Current: Android 15
- System-on-chip: MediaTeK MT6855
- CPU: Octa-core (2x2.2 GHz Cortex-A78 & 6x2.0 GHz Cortex-A55)
- GPU: IMG BXM-8-256
- Memory: 4 GB, 8 GB, 12 GB RAM
- Storage: 128 GB, 256 GB
- Removable storage: microSDXC
- SIM: nanoSIM, eSIM or Hybrid Dual SIM
- Battery: 5000 mAh (G54 "Power Edition" 6000mAh)
- Charging: 15 W (G54 "Power Edition" variant 33 W)
- Rear camera: 50 MP, f/1.8, PDAF, OIS
- Front camera: 16 MP, f/2.4
- Display: 6.5-inch IPS LCD, 1080 × 2400 pixels, 120 Hz
- Sound: Stereo speakers, 3.5 mm jack, Dolby Atmos
- Connectivity: Bluetooth v5.3 USB-C 2.0; Wi-Fi 802.11 a/b/g/n/ac, dual-band NFC; GPS, GLONASS, GALILEO, BDS, QZSS
- Water resistance: Water-repellent design with IP 54
- Other: material: glass (front), plastic/vegan leather (back)
- Website: https://motorola.com

The Moto G54 5G (Cancunf) is a smartphone developed by Motorola Mobility. Released on September 5, 2023, it is part of the Moto G series.

The Moto G54 5G features a 6.5-inch IPS LCD display with a resolution of 1080 × 2400 pixels and a refresh rate of 120 Hz. It is powered by a MediaTek Dimensity 7020 chipset, with an octa-core CPU and IMG BXM-8-256 GPU. The device comes with various memory configurations, including 4 GB, 8 GB, and 12 GB RAM options, and 128 GB or 256 GB of internal storage, expandable via microSDXC card. It houses a 5000 mAh battery and supports 33 W wired charging. The Moto G54 5G is equipped with a dual-camera setup on the rear, featuring a 50 MP main sensor with f/1.8 aperture, phase detection autofocus (PDAF), and optical image stabilization (OIS). The front camera is a 16 MP sensor with f/2.4 aperture. It includes stereo speakers and support for Dolby Atmos technology.

Upon release, the Moto G54 5G received positive reviews for its display quality, battery life, and overall design. However, its camera performance was noted as adequate but not exceptional. A review from Tech Advisor also noted that the screen's brightness was unexceptional and may be dim under sunlight conditions.
