= Moto G (2022) =

Android smartphones developed by Motorola Mobility

- Manufacturer: Motorola Mobility
- Type: Phablet
- Series: Moto G Family
- First released: February 17, 2022; 4 years ago
- Predecessor: Moto G (2021)
- Successor: Moto G (2023)
- Form factor: Slate
- Development status: Released
- Website: www.motorola.com/us/smartphones-moto-g-family

Moto G (2022) is a series of Android smartphones that belongs to the Moto G family developed by Motorola Mobility, a subsidiary of Lenovo.

== Specifications ==
Some specifications, such as wireless technologies and storage, vary by region.

Comparison of specifications between the phones
	Motorola Moto G Stylus (2022)	Motorola Moto G Stylus 5G (2022)	Motorola Moto G 5G (2022)	Motorola Moto G Power (2022)
Release Date	February 17, 2022	April 22, 2022	April 22, 2022	February 22, 2022
Operating System	Android 11, Android 12 (upgraded May 10, 2023)	Android 12, Android 13 (upgraded October 10, 2023)	Android 12, Android 13 (upgraded July 13, 2023)	Android 11, Android 12 (upgraded November 16, 2022)
Display Size	6.8 inches	6.8 inches	6.5 inches	6.5 inches
Display Resolution	FHD+ 1080 x 2460 pixels (20.5:9 at 396 PPI)	FHD+ 1080 x 2460 pixels (20.5:9 at 395 PPI)	HD+ 720 x 1600 pixels (20:9 at 270 PPI)	HD+ 720 x 1600 pixels (20:9 at 270 PPI)
Display Technology	IPS LCD	IPS LCD	IPS LCD	IPS LCD
Refresh Rate	90 Hz	120 Hz	90 Hz	90 Hz
Screen-body ratio	84.6%	85.8%	81.4%	79.7%
Display Cutout	Pinhole	Pinhole	Pinhole	Pinhole
Fingerprint Scanner	Yes, side-mounted	Yes, side-mounted	Yes, side-mounted	Yes, side-mounted
Battery	5,000 mAh non-removable Li-Po	5,000 mAh non-removable Li-Po	5,000 mAh non-removable Li-Po	5,000 mAh non-removable Li-Po
Charging	USB-C, 10 W	USB-C, TurboPower 10	USB-C, 10 W	USB-C, 10 W
Processor	MediaTek Helio G88 (12nm)	Qualcomm Snapdragon 695 (6nm)	MediaTek Dimensity 700 (7nm)	MediaTek Helio G37 (12nm)
CPU	2x2.0 GHz Cortex-A75 & 6x1.8 GHz Cortex-A55	2x2.2 GHz Kryo 660 Gold & 6x1.8 GHz Kryo 660 Silver	2x2.0 GHz Cortex-A76 & 6x2.0 GHz Cortex-A55	4x2.3 GHz Cortex-A53 & 4x1.8 GHz Cortex-A53
Graphics	Mali-G52 MC2	Adreno 619	Mali-G57 MC2	PowerVR GE8320
Storage	128 GB	128/256 GB	64/256 GB	64/128 GB
Expandable Storage	MicroSDXC up to 512 GB	MicroSDXC up to 1 TB	MicroSDXC up to 512 GB	MicroSDXC up to 512 GB
RAM	4/6 GB	4/6/8 GB	4/6 GB	4 GB
Front Camera	(Image)16 MP (Video) 1080p@30fps	(Image)16 MP (Video) 1080p@30fps	(Image)13 MP (Video) 1080p@30fps	(Image) 8 MP (Video)1080p@30fps
Rear Camera	(Image)50 MP (wide) with 8 MP (ultrawide) 8MP (Macro) 2 MP (depth) (Video) 1080p@30/60fps gyro-EIS	(Image)50 MP (wide) with 8 MP (ultrawide), 8 MP (macro), and 2MP (Depth) (Video) 1080p@30/60fpsgyro-EIS	(Image)50 MP (wide) with 2 MP (macro) and 2 MP (depth) (Video) 1080p@30fps	(Image)50 MP (wide) with 2 MP (macro) and 2 MP (depth) (Video) 1080p@30fps gyro-EIS
Audio	Loudspeaker and 3.5mm audio jack	Loudspeaker and 3.5mm audio jack	Loudspeaker and 3.5mm audio jack	Loudspeaker and 3.5mm audio jack
Technology (Mobile data)	GSM, WCDMA, LTE	GSM, WCDMA, LTE, 5G	GSM, WDCMA, LTE, 5G	GSM, WCDMA, LTE
Wi-Fi	Wi-Fi 802.11 a/b/g/n/ac and dual band support	Wi-Fi 802.11 a/b/g/n/ac and dual band support	Wi-Fi 802.11 a/b/g/n/ac and dual band support	Wi-Fi 802.11 a/b/g/n/ac and dual band support
Bluetooth	5.0, A2DP, LE	5.1, A2DP, LE	5.1, A2DP, LE	5.0, A2DP, LE
NFC	Yes, FM Radio	Yes, FM Radio	Yes, FM Radio	Yes, FM Radio
USB Data Rate	USB 2.0	USB 2.0	USB 2.0	USB 2.0
Weight	216 g	215 g	204 g	203 g
Dimensions	170.2 x 75.9 x 9.5 mm	168.9 x 75.8 x 9.3 mm	165.4 x 75.8 x 9.4 mm	167.2 x 75.6 x 9.4 mm
Colours (alias)	Twilight Blue, Metallic Rose	Steel Blue, Seafoam Green	Moonlight Gray	Black
Models	XT2211-2	XT2215-4	XT2213-3	XT2165DL
