= Moto G8 =

Android smartphones developed by Motorola Mobility

moto g^{8}
- Manufacturer: Motorola Mobility
- Type: Phablet
- Series: Moto G Family
- Predecessor: Moto G7
- Successor: Moto G9
- Related: Moto G (2020)
- Form factor: Slate
- Development status: Discontinued
- Website: Moto G8

Moto G8 (stylized by Motorola as moto g^{8}) is a series of Android smartphones developed by Motorola Mobility, a subsidiary of Lenovo. It is the eighth generation of the Moto G family. The G8 Play and G8 Plus were first released in October 2019, only 8 months after the previous generation. Other variants were released in March and April 2020.

== Release ==
The G8 Plus and Play were announced in October 2019 and released in Europe and Latin America in October and November 2019; an international version was also released. The G8 Power was announced in February 2020, followed by the G8 in March 2020. The G8 and G8 Power were released in Europe and Latin America in March and April 2020. The G8 Power Lite was announced and released in April 2020 for Europe and Latin America.

== Specifications ==
Some specifications, such as wireless technologies and storage, will vary by region.

Comparison of specifications between the models
| | Motorola Moto G8 Play | Motorola Moto G8 | Motorola Moto G8 Plus | Motorola Moto G8 Power Lite | Motorola Moto G8 Power |
|---|---|---|---|---|---|
| Release date | October 2019 | 5 March 2020 | 24 October 2019 | 3 April 2020 | 3 February 2020 |
| Operating System | Android 9 Android 10 | Android 10 Android 11 | Android 9 Android 10 | Android 9 | Android 10 Android 11 |
| Display Size | 6.2 inches | 6.4 inches | 6.3 inches | 6.5 inches | 6.4 inches |
| Display Resolution | HD+ 720 x 1520 pixels (19:9 at 271 ppi) | HD+ 720 x 1560 pixels (19.5:9 at 268 ppi) | FHD+ 1080 x 2280 pixels (19:9 at 400 ppi) | HD+ 720 x 1600 pixels (20:9 at 269 ppi) | FHD+ 1080 x 2300 pixels (19.2:9 at 399 ppi) |
| Display Technology | IPS LCD | IPS LCD | IPS LCD | IPS LCD | IPS LCD |
| Refresh Rate | 60Hz | 60Hz | 60Hz | 60Hz | 60Hz |
| Screen-body ratio | 80.7% | 82.2% | 82.5% | 82.2% | 85.1% |
| Display Cutout | Small notch | Pinhole | Small notch | Small notch | Pinhole |
| Fingerprint Scanner | Yes, rear-mounted | Yes, rear-mounted | Yes, rear-mounted | Yes, rear-mounted | Yes, rear-mounted |
| Battery | 4,000 mAh non-removable Li-Po | 4,000 mAh non-removable Li-Po | 4,000 mAh non-removable Li-Po | 5,000 mAh non-removable Li-Po | 5,000 mAh non-removable Li-Po |
| Charging | USB-C, 10W | USB-C, 10W | USB-C, 15W TurboPower | microUSB, 10W | USB-C, 15W TurboPower |
| Processor | MediaTek Helio P70M (12nm) | Qualcomm Snapdragon 665 (11nm) | Qualcomm Snapdragon 665 (11nm) | MediaTek Helio P35 (12nm) | Qualcomm Snapdragon 665 (11nm) |
| CPU | 4x2.1 GHz Cortex-A73 & 4x2.0 GHz Cortex-A53 | 4x2.0 GHz Kryo 260 Gold & 4x1.8 GHz Kryo 260 Silver | 4x2.0 GHz Kryo 260 Gold & 4x1.8 GHz Kryo 260 Silver | 4x2.3 GHz Cortex-A53 & 4x1.8 GHz Cortex-A53 | 4x2.0 GHz Kryo 260 Gold & 4x1.8 GHz Kryo 260 Silver |
| Graphics | Mali-G72 MP3 | Adreno 610 | Adreno 610 | PowerVR GE8320 | Adreno 610 |
| Storage | 32 GB | 64 GB | 64 GB | 64 GB | 64 GB |
| Expandable Storage | MicroSDXC up to 512 GB | MicroSDXC up to 512 GB | MicroSDXC up to 512 GB | MicroSDXC up to 256 GB | MicroSDXC up to 512 GB |
| RAM | 2 GB | 4 GB | 4 GB | 4 GB | 4 GB |
| Front Camera | 8 MP | 8 MP | 25 MP | 8 MP | 16 MP |
| Rear Camera Stills | 13 MP (wide) with 8 MP (ultrawide) dedicated video camera and a 2 MP depth sensor | 16 MP (wide) with 8 MP (ultrawide) dedicated video camera and 2 MP macro | 48 MP (wide) with 16 MP (ultrawide) dedicated video camera and a 5 MP depth sensor | 16 MP (wide) with 2 MP macro and a 2 MP depth sensor | 16 MP (wide) with 8 MP (ultrawide) dedicated video camera, 8 MP telephoto sensor, and 2 MP macro |
| Rear Camera Video | 1080p@30fps | 4K@30fps or 1080p@60fps | 4K@30fps or 1080p@30/60/120fps | 1080p@30fps | 4K@30fps or 1080p@30/60fps |
| Rear Flash | LED | LED | LED | LED | LED |
| Audio | Mono loudspeaker and 3.5mm audio jack | Mono loudspeaker and 3.5mm audio jack | Stereo loudspeakers and 3.5mm audio jack | Mono loudspeaker and 3.5mm audio jack | Stereo loudspeakers and 3.5mm audio jack |
| Technology (Mobile data) | GSM, HSPA, LTE | GSM, HSPA, LTE | GSM, HSPA, LTE | GSM, HSPA, LTE | GSM, HSPA, LTE |
| Wi-Fi | Wi-Fi 802.11 b/g/n | Wi-Fi 802.11 b/g/n | Wi-Fi 802.11 a/b/g/n/ac and dual band support | Wi-Fi 802.11 b/g/n | Wi-Fi 802.11 b/g/n |
| Bluetooth | 4.2, A2DP, LE | 5.0, A2DP, LE | 5.0, A2DP, LE, aptX | 4.2, A2DP, LE | 5.0, A2DP, LE, aptX |
| NFC | No | No | Yes (region dependent) | No | No |
| USB Data Rate | USB 2.0 | USB 2.0 | USB 2.0 | USB 2.0 | USB 2.0 |
| Weight | 184g | 188g | 188g | 200g | 197g |
| Dimensions | 157.6 x 75.4 x 9 mm | 161.3 x 75.8 x 9 mm | 158.4 x 75.8 x 9.1 mm | 164.9 x 75.8 x 9.2 mm | 156 x 75.8 x 9.6 mm |
| Colours (alias) | Magenta Red, Black Onyx | White Prism, Capri Blue | Crystal Pink, Cosmic Blue | Arctic Blue, Royal Blue | Smoke Black, Capri Blue |
| Model Number | XT2015; XT2015-2 | XT2045-1 | XT2019; XT2019-2 | XT2055-2 | XT2041-3 |
| Availability | South America, Mexico | South America, Mexico, Europe, Japan | South America, Mexico, Europe, India, Japan, Middle East (One Vision Plus) | South America, Mexico, Europe, India, Japan | South America, Mexico, Europe, Japan |

== Reception ==
=== G8 Plus ===
The G8 Plus received mixed to positive reviews from critics. The Verge gave it a score of 8/10, praising its battery life and day-to-day performance, among others, while criticizing the lack of wireless charging, water resistance, Android 10, and camera performance. Android Authority gave it a score of 6.8/10, positively describing the usability, action camera, and build quality, while criticizing the performance and camera image quality. TechRadar gave it a score of 3.5/5. However, the device also faced criticism for several drawbacks, including the lack of wireless charging, water resistance, and its launch with the older Android 9 software instead of Android 10.
