= SlimRoms =

Android custom ROM

- Developer: SlimRoms Team
- OS family: Android (Linux)
- Working state: Discontinued
- Source model: Open source
- Initial release: 2012; 14 years ago
- Latest release: Slim7 2.0
- Package manager: APK
- Kernel type: Monolithic (Linux)
- License: Apache License 2.0, GNU GPLv2, and various other licenses
- Official website: web.archive.org/web/20231227172644/https://slimroms.org/

SlimRoms (also Slim7, Slim6, SlimLP, SlimKat or SlimBean) is an Android custom ROM. Its main feature is the many setting options of the user interface. The last release was in 2018.

Since September 2, 2015 SlimRoms has been organised as a United Kingdom limited company, after having previously been a German registered association (an e. V.) in Germany.

== Features ==
The name of the current SlimRoms version is usually composed of Slim and the code name of the Android version used. An exception is the current version called Slim6 (Android version: Marshmallow).

Some of these features are no longer included in SlimRoms since SlimLP. In most cases the reason is the change of the user interface of Android with the introduction of the material design for Android 5.0 and upwards.

=== Features no longer available since SlimLP ===
==== TRDS ====
With "the real dark Slim" option (TRDS) dark backgrounds in the menu of the versions SlimKat and SlimBean were coloured deep black and not dark grey like e.g. Stock-Android. Furthermore, some Google Apps were partially inverted. The light backgrounds became black and the font turned white. This option could optionally be adjusted automatically depending on the lighting conditions.

==== SlimPie ====
With SlimPIE there was a customizable menu based on CyanogenMod's CM Pie, which appeared semicircular when touched at the edge of the screen. This allowed shortcuts to apps or functions without navigating through menus.

==== Dialer ====
The dialer of SlimRom allows you to browse telephone books and additionally displays corresponding telephone book entries for incoming calls. However, this function is only available in Canada and the USA.

==== Shake Events ====
Shake events allowed the user to start certain apps or lock the device when shaking it. Here it could be set whether a distinction should be made between horizontal and vertical shaking.

==== Camera ====
The camera has been enhanced with SmartCapture and TrueView functions. The former is intended to enable particularly short shutter release times, the latter is intended to display the entire area captured by the camera.

=== Characteristics not affected by this ===
==== Google Apps ====
For licensing reasons - as with almost all custom ROMs - the Google Apps are not pre-installed, but they can be installed later via recovery (e.g. TWRP).

==== Launcher ====
By default, the Google Now Launcher and the Slim Launcher are installed, but the user chooses one of the two when setting up for the first time. A special feature of the SlimRom are the detailed setting options of the graphical user interface: Among other things, the start bar and the quick settings menu can be changed, and entries can be added and removed. In addition, it is possible to change the color and sometimes - like the battery symbol - the shape of individual entries such as the power menu and the status bar.

The behavior of animations when scrolling through menus can also be adjusted. The user can choose from about 10 different animations.

==== SlimRecents ====
The menu of recently used applications has also been revised and renamed SlimRecents. A sidebar appears, showing the most recently used applications. A special feature of SlimRom is that it can also be displayed on the left side of the screen, e.g. to enable left-handed users to operate the device more easily.

==== Privacy Guard ====
SlimRom has a so-called Privacy Guard, which allows to revoke the permissions of an app afterwards. This prevents potential security risks caused by too many authorizations on the part of the developers.

==== Root access ====
The superuser is available, but it must be enabled in the developer options first. A rights management is already pre-installed, so that a subsequent installation of corresponding apps is not necessary. Superuser is replaced in SlimLP by CyanogenMod's PrivacyGuard, however.

==== Notifications ====
SlimRom allows users to have notifications displayed as bars at the top or bottom of the display. This option is disabled by default and must be enabled manually for each app individually. Another customization option of the custom ROM is the ability to display apps or contacts in the notification bar.

=== New features introduced with SlimLP ===
==== Slim Dim ====
With SlimDim, the navigation bar can be dimmed to a level desired by the end device user during inactivity, so that the buttons are less conspicuous. When touched near the buttons they light up again.

== Availability ==
Currently 60 different devices are supported, a list can be found on the former project page. However, only for about 25 devices the latest version of the ROM can be downloaded from the project page.

== Reception ==
In March 2015 website difficulties and infrastructure improvements were highlighted by XDA Developers. In October 2015 project difficulties were discussed in more detail. In June 2016 XDA announced SlimRoms' release of Slim6 Marshmallow.

In 2017 John Hoff of AndroidCommunity.com reviewed Slim7 version 1.0, SlimRoms’ first stable Nougat build. He said it came without unneeded bloat, and was very fast as a result.

Resurrection Remix is partly based on SlimRoms.

In 2017 Andreas Hitzig of PCWelt recommended SlimRoms as "slimmer but less demanding systems" as alternatives to Cyanogenmod.

== See also ==
- LineageOS
- List of custom Android distributions
