= Moto G6 =

Android smartphone developed by Motorola Mobility

moto g^{6}

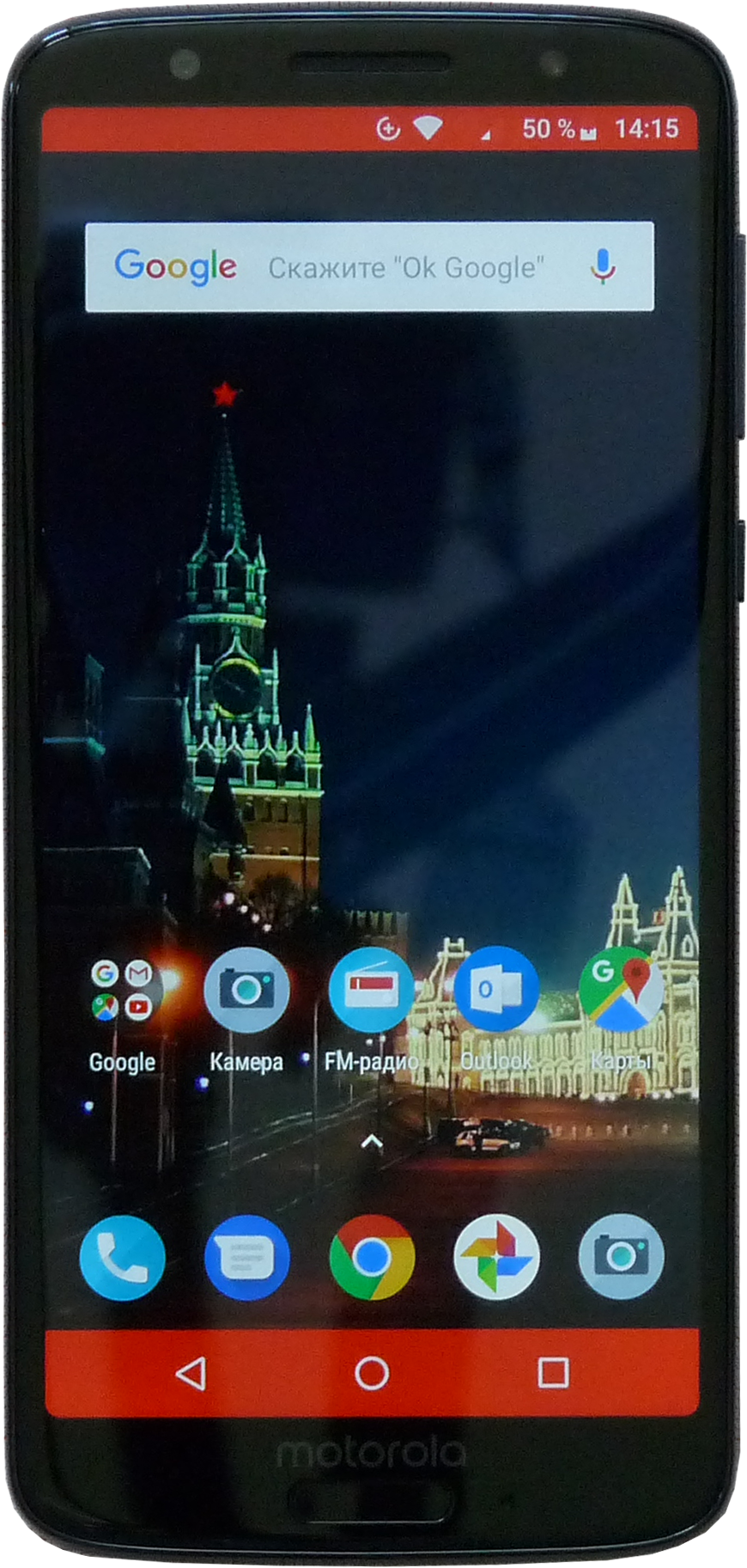
- Moto G6 running Android 8
- Brand: Motorola
- Manufacturer: Motorola Mobility
- Type: Smartphone (G6 Play and G6); Phablet (G6 Plus)
- Series: Moto G Family
- First released: 19 April 2018
- Predecessor: Moto G5
- Successor: Moto G7
- Form factor: Slate
- Operating system: Android 8.0 "Oreo" (upgradeable to 9.0 "Pie")
- CPU: G6: Snapdragon 450; G6 Play: Qualcomm Snapdragon 430; G6 Plus: Snapdragon 630
- GPU: G6: Adreno 506; G6 Play: Adreno 505; G6 Plus: Adreno 508
- Memory: 2 or 3 GB RAM
- Battery: G6: 3000 mAh; G6 Play: 4000 mAh; G6 Plus: 3200 mAh
- Display: G6: 5.7 inches (14 cm); G6 Play: 5.7 inches (14 cm); G6 Plus: 5.9 inches (15 cm)
- Sound: 3.5 mm jack Dolby Audio, with built-in presets and a custom equalizer
- Connectivity: USB-C, USB On-The-Go
- Data inputs: Capacitive touchscreen display
- Codename: G6: ali G6 Plus: evert G6 Play: jeter
- Development status: Discontinued
- Website: www.motorola.com/us/products/moto-g-family

Moto G6 (stylized by Motorola as moto g^{6}) is a series of Android smartphones developed by Motorola Mobility, a subsidiary of Lenovo. It is the sixth generation of the Moto G family and the successor to the Moto G5 series. The three phones in the series, the G6, G6 Plus, and G6 Play, were released globally from April to June 2018, although the G6 Plus did not arrive in India until September 2018.

== Release ==
Announced as successors to the Moto G5, the phones were scheduled to be released on May 9, 2018 in several markets including Europe, South America, North America and parts of Asia; however, Motorola missed its release date for North America and India.

The G6 was made available in the United States by May 23, 2018 from Boost Mobile, and on the following day through Verizon Wireless. It was later made available on Amazon for a discounted price. On June 5, the G6 was made available for purchase on Motorola's United States website. The G6 Plus was not released in the United States, likely due to its similarities to the already available Moto X4.

The G6 series was released in Brazil on April 19, 2018. In India, the G6 and G6 Play were released on June 4, 2018, while the G6 Plus was released on September 10, 2018.

== Software ==
The G6 series was released with Android 8 "Oreo". An update to Android 9 "Pie" for the G6 Plus was rolled out to various countries in January 2019. In February 2019, the update was rolled out for the G6 Play and G6 in Brazil, and was expected to be released worldwide at a later date.

The Pie update reached Australia on February 4 for the G6 Plus, March 20 for the G6, and the G6 Play a week later.

In March 2019 there were articles claiming that the G6 series would receive an official Android 10 update. Later articles, however, claimed to quote a new Motorola policy wherein G-series phones would only receive one major Android version upgrade, i.e., the G6 would receive the upgrade from 8.0 (Oreo) to 9.0 (Pie) but not any other upgrade.

=== G6 ===
The Android Pie update was rolled out on February 6, 2019, to the United States, then reached Brazil on February 15. Australian devices received the update on March 20, and users in India received the update on March 21.

=== G6 Play ===
The Android Pie update reached G6 Play users in Brazil on February 16, 2019, then rolled out in India two days later. It reached United Kingdom users on April 1, 2019.

=== G6 Plus ===
The Android Pie update was rolled out to G6 Plus users in India on December 31, 2018. It then reached the United States on January 8, 2019.

== Known issues ==
Videos recorded on the Moto G6 sometimes have distorted audio: the audio cuts off when using headphones and volume levels below 50%.

Several users reported on Motorola's forums about degraded audio quality after the Android 9 "Pie" update.

When connecting a headset or headphones, Dolby Audio will activate on opening and expanding the notification area. In some cases, the user needs to scroll to the Dolby icon.

== Reception ==
The G6 series has been received well by reviewers for its features relative to its low to mid range price. Wired praised the G6's "class-leading tech" and stated that the "accessible" price "highlights the impending identity crisis of expensive phones". CNET rated the G6 four out of five stars, calling the G6 "a sublime value" and stating "a budget phone shouldn't be this good".

In India, the price tag of 22,499 rupees for the G6 Plus drew some criticism for being the most expensive Moto G phone at the time of release, a sharp increase from the previous year's price of about 16,000 rupees for the G5 Plus and G5s Plus.

== Specifications ==
The specification varies slightly between countries.

Stat	G6	G6 Plus	G6 Play
Price (Euro)	249	299	199
Release date	Brazil: April 19, 2018; Mexico: April 29, 2018; Europe: May 9, 2018; United States: May 23, 2018; Colombia: June 7, 2018		
Release date	India: June 4, 2018	India: September 10, 2018	India: June 4, 2018
Operating System	Android 8.0 Oreo (upgradeable to Android 9.0 Pie in some countries)		
Display Size	5.7 inches (14 cm)	5.9 inches (15 cm)	5.7 inches (14 cm)
Display Resolution	1080p @ 18:9		720p @ 18:9
Processor	Snapdragon 450 octa-core	Snapdragon 630 octa-core	Snapdragon 430 octa-core
Graphics	Adreno 506 @ 600 MHz	Adreno 508 @ 700 MHz	Adreno 505 @ 450 MHz
RAM	3 GB/4 GB	4 GB/6 GB	3 GB
Storage	32/64 GB	64/128 GB	32 GB
Expandable Storage	Up to 128 GB		
Wi-Fi	Dual-band 802.11a/b/g/n	Dual-band 802.11a/b/g/n/ac	Dual-band 802.11a/b/g/n
Bluetooth	4.2	5	4.2
GPS (US model)	GPS, A-GPS, GLONASS, BEIDOU	GPS, A-GPS, GLONASS	GPS, A-GPS, GLONASS
Fingerprint Scanner	Yes, Front		Yes, Rear
Rear Camera Stills	12 MP + 5 MP dual. f/1.8	12 MP + 4 MP Dual. Dual AutoFocus Pixel, f/1.7, 1.4 um	13 MP, f/2.0
Rear Camera Video	1080p @ 30/60 FPS 720p @ 30 FPS	4K @ 30 FPS 1080p @ 30/60 FPS 720p @ 30 FPS	1080p @ 30 FPS 720p @ 30 FPS
Rear Flash	Yes		
Front Camera	16 MP or 8 MP (varies by market) 1080p @ 30 FPS 720p @ 30 FPS		8 MP 1080p @ 30 fps 720p @ 30 FPS
Audio	Front speaker & 3.5 mm jack		
Waterproof	P2i		P2i (US Only)
Battery	3000 mAh non-removable	3200 mAh non-removable	4000 mAh non-removable
Charging	TurboPower (15 W) over USB-C		TurboPower over Micro-USB
Dimensions (mm)	153.8 x 72.3 x 8.3	160 x 75.5 x 8	154.4 x 72.2 x 9
