= Moto G (2021) =

Android smartphones developed by Motorola Mobility

- Manufacturer: Motorola Mobility
- Type: Phablet
- Series: Moto G Family
- First released: January 13, 2021; 5 years ago
- Predecessor: Moto G (2020)
- Successor: Moto G (2022)
- Form factor: Slate
- Development status: Discontinued
- Website: www.motorola.com/us/smartphones-moto-g-family

Moto G (2021) is a series of Android smartphones that belongs to the Moto G family developed by Motorola Mobility, a subsidiary of Lenovo.

== Specifications ==
Some specifications, such as wireless technologies and storage, vary by region.

Comparison of specifications between the models
	Motorola Moto G Play	Motorola Moto G Power	Motorola Moto G Stylus (2021)	Motorola Moto G Stylus 5G	Motorola Moto G Pure
Release date	January 14, 2021	January 14, 2021	January 14, 2021	June 9, 2021	October 7, 2021
Operating System	Android 10	Android 10	Android 10	Android 11 Android 12	Android 11
Display Size	6.5 inches	6.6 inches	6.8 inches	6.8 inches	6.5 inches
Display Resolution	HD+ 720 x 1600 pixels (20:9 at 266 PPI)	HD+ 720 x 1600 pixels (20:9 at 270 PPI)	FHD+ 1080 x 2400 pixels (20:9 at 386 PPI)	FHD+ 1080 x 2400 pixels (20:9 at 387 PPI)	HD+ 720 x 1600 pixels (20:9 at 270 PPI)
Display Technology	IPS LCD	IPS LCD	IPS LCD	LTPS IPS LCD	IPS LCD
Refresh Rate	60Hz	60Hz	60Hz	60Hz	60Hz
Screen-body ratio	80.6%	83.8%	84.8%	85.0%	80.6%
Display Cutout	Notch	Pinhole	Pinhole	Pinhole	Notch
Fingerprint Scanner	Yes, rear-mounted	Yes, side-mounted	Yes, side-mounted	Yes, side-mounted	Yes, rear-mounted
Battery	5000 mAh non-removable Li-Po	5000 mAh non-removable Li-Po	4000 mAh non-removable Li-Po	5000 mAh non-removable Li-Po	4000 mAh non-removable Li-Po
Charging	USB-C, 10W	USB-C, 15 W TurboPower	USB-C, 10W	USB-C, 10W	USB-C, 10W
Processor	Qualcomm Snapdragon 460 (11nm)	Qualcomm Snapdragon 662 (11nm)	Qualcomm Snapdragon 678 (11nm)	Qualcomm Snapdragon 480 (8nm)	MediaTek Helio G25 (12nm)
CPU	4x1.8 GHz Kryo 240 Gold & 4x1.6 GHz Kryo 240 Silver	4x2.0 GHz Kryo 260 Gold & 4x1.8 GHz Kryo 260 Silver	2x2.2 GHz Kryo 460 Gold & 6x1.7 GHz Kryo 460 Silver	2x2.0 GHz Kryo 460 Gold & 6x1.8 GHz Kryo 460 Silver	4x2.0 GHz Cortex-A53 & 4x1.5 GHz Cortex-A53
Graphics	Adreno 610	Adreno 610	Adreno 612	Adreno 619	PowerVR GE8320
Storage	32 GB	32/64 GB	128 GB	128/256 GB	32 GB
Expandable Storage	MicroSDXC up to 512 GB	MicroSDXC up to 512 GB	MicroSDXC up to 512 GB	MicroSDXC up to 1 TB	MicroSDXC up to 512 GB
RAM	3 GB	3/4 GB	4 GB	4/6 GB	3 GB
Front Camera	(Image)5 MP (Video)1080p@30fps	(Image)8 MP (Video)1080p@30fps	(Image)16 MP (Video)1080p@30fps gryo-EIS	(Image)16 MP (Video) 1080p@30fps	(Image)5MP (Video) 1080p@30fps
Rear Camera	(Image)13 MP (wide) with 2 MP (depth) (Video)1080p@30/60fps	(Image)48 MP (wide) with 2 MP (macro) and 2 MP (depth) (Video) 1080p@30/60fps gyro-EIS	(Image)48 MP (wide) with 8 MP (ultrawide) 2 MP (macro) and 2 MP (depth) (Video)4K@30fps or 1080p@30/60fps gyro-EIS	(Image) 48 MP (wide) with 8 MP (ultrawide), 5 MP (macro) and 2 MP (depth) (Video) 1080p@30/60fps	(Image)13 MP (wide) with 2 MP (depth) (Video)1080p@30fps
Camera Features	(Rear Image) PDAF, LED flash, auto scene detection, portrait mode, HDR, panorama, pro (manual) mode, Active Photos, and Google Lens (Rear Video) Slow-motion and time-lapse PDAF, LED flash, auto scene detection, portrait mode, HDR, panorama, pro (manual) mode, Active Photos, Google Lens	(Rear Image) QPB, PDAF, LED flash, auto scene detection, portrait mode, Night Vision, panorama, pro (manual) mode, macro mode, HDR, RAW support, smile trigger, gesture trigger, and Google Lens (Rear Video) Slow-motion and time-lapse	(Rear Image) QPB, PDAF, LED flash, Active photos, Night Vision, portrait mode, HDR, panorama, Google Lens, pro (manual) mode, and RAW format (Rear Video) Slow-motion and time-lapse	(Rear Image) PDAF, LED Flash, pro (manual, with long exposure up to 32 sec), portrait mode, night, panorama, group selfie, spot color, cutout, cinemagraph, liver filter modes, auto HDR, RAW format, smile trigger, Google Lens (Rear Video) Slow-motion, time-lapse, spot color, dual capture (front and rear cameras simultaneously)	(Rear Image) PDAF, LED flash, Auto smile capture, Smart composition, HDR, Timer, Active photos, Burst shot, Pro mode, Portrait mode, Cutout, Spot color, Google Lens (Rear Video) Time-lapse
Audio	Loudspeaker and 3.5mm audio jack	Loudspeaker and 3.5mm audio jack	Loudspeaker and 3.5mm audio jack	Loudspeaker and 3.5mm audio jack	Loudspeaker and 3.5mm audio jack
Technology (Mobile data)	GSM, CMDA, WCMDA, LTE	GSM, CMDA, WCMDA, LTE	GSM, CMDA, HSPA, LTE	GSM, WCDMA, LTE, 5G	GSM, WCDMA, LTE
Wi-Fi	Wi-Fi 802.11 a/b/g/n/ac and dual band support	Wi-Fi 802.11 a/b/g/n/ac and dual band support	Wi-Fi 802.11 a/b/g/n/ac and dual band support	Wi-Fi 802.11 a/b/g/n/ac and dual band support	Wi-Fi 802.11 a/b/g/n/ac and dual band support
Bluetooth	5.0, A2DP, LE	5.0, A2DP, LE	5.0, A2DP, LE	5.0, A2DP, LE	5.0, A2DP, LE
NFC	No	No	No	No	No
Radio	Yes, FM Radio	Yes, FM Radio	Yes, FM Radio	Yes, FM Radio	No
USB Data Rate	USB 2.0	USB 2.0	USB 2.0	USB 2.0	USB 2.0
Weight	204 g	207 g	213 g	217 g	188 g
Dimensions	166.6 x 76 x 9.4 mm	165.3 x 75.9 x 9.5 mm	169.8 x 77.9 x 9 mm	169.5 x 77.5 x 9.4 mm	167.4 x 75.6 x 8.8 mm
Colors (alias)	Misty Blue	Flash Gray, Polar Silver	Aurora Black, Aurora White	Cosmic Emerald	Deep Indigo
Model Number	XT2093-3, XT2093-4, XT2093-7, XT2093-DL, XT2093DL	XT2117	XT2115, XT2115-1	XT2131, XT2131DL, XT2131-1, XT2131-3, XT2131-4	XT-2163-4, XT2163-4
