= Moto G4 =

Android smartphone developed by Motorola Mobility

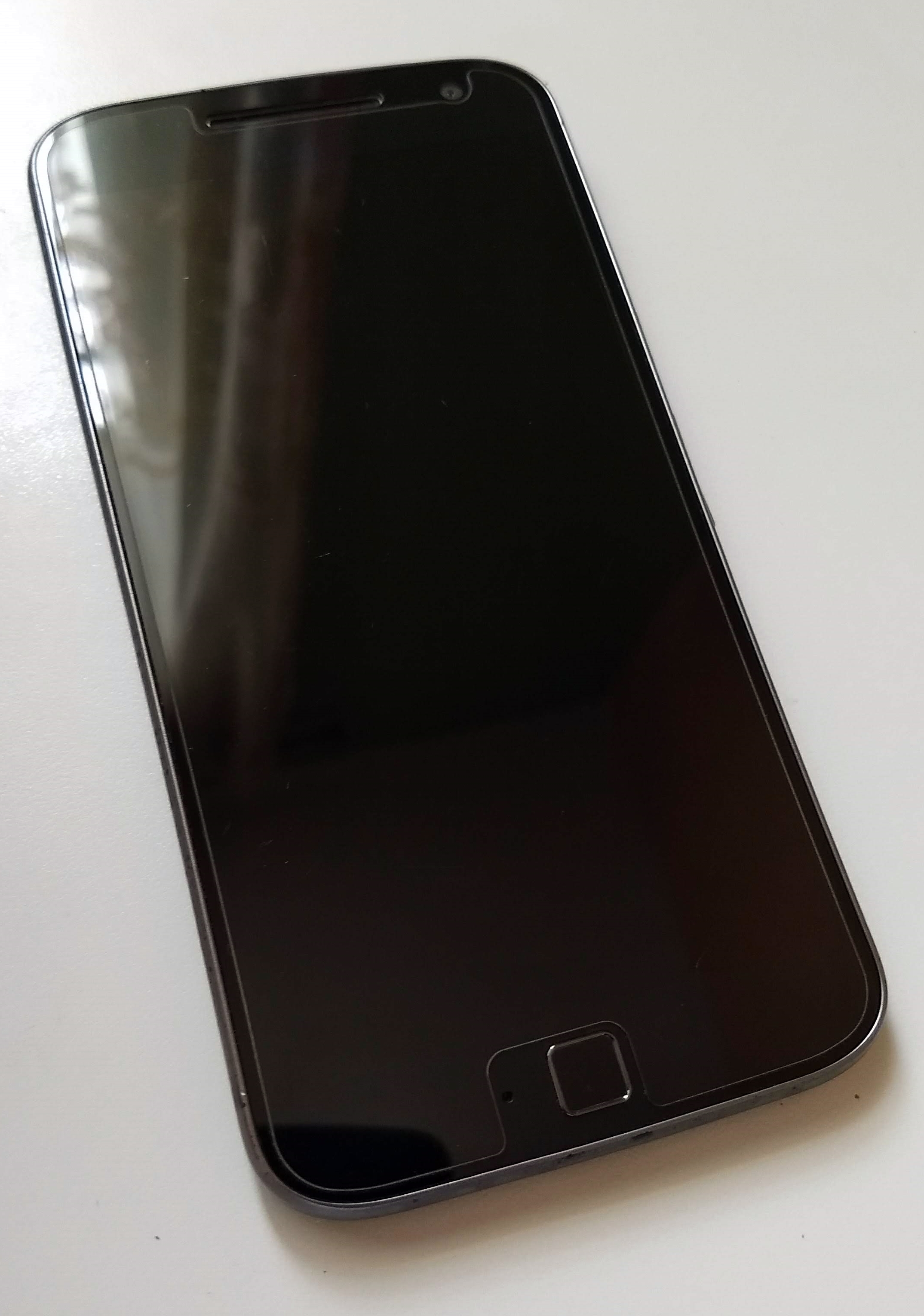
- Moto G4 Plus XT1641 (Latin American model). The phone shown above in the image has a protection foil applied on the display.
- Brand: Motorola
- Manufacturer: Motorola Mobility
- Type: Smartphone (G4 Play); Phablet (G4 and G4 Plus)
- Series: Moto
- First released: May 17, 2016
- Predecessor: Moto G (3rd generation)
- Successor: Moto G5
- Related: Moto E3 Power; Moto Z
- Form factor: Slate
- Dimensions: G4 Play: 144.4 mm (5.69 in) H 72 mm (2.8 in) W 9.9 mm (0.39 in) D G4, G4 Plus: 153 mm (6.0 in) H 76.6 mm (3.02 in) W 9.8 mm (0.39 in) D
- Weight: G4 Play: 137 g (4.8 oz); G4, G4 Plus: 155 g (5.5 oz)
- Operating system: Original: Android 6.0.1 "Marshmallow"; Current: Android 7.0 "Nougat" (8.1 "Oreo" on G4 Plus)
- System-on-chip: Qualcomm Snapdragon 410 (for Moto G4 Play); Qualcomm Snapdragon 617 (for Moto G4 and Moto G4 Plus)
- CPU: 1.2 GHz (Moto G4 Play); 4x1.5 GHz 4x1.2 GHz 64-bit (Moto G4 and Moto G4 Plus)
- GPU: Adreno 306 (Moto G4 Play); Adreno 405 (Moto G4 and Moto G4 Plus)
- Memory: 1 or 2 GB (Moto G4 Play); 2 or 3 GB (Moto G4); 2, 3 or 4 GB (Moto G4 Plus)
- Storage: 8 or 16 GB (Moto G4 Play); 16 or 32 GB (Moto G4); 16, 32 or 64 GB (Moto G4 Plus); All 3 models are expandable via microSD card slot
- Removable storage: microSDXC up to 128 GB
- Battery: 2800 mAh Li-po removable (Moto G4 Play); 3000 mAh Li-ion non-removable (Moto G4 and Moto G4 Plus)
- Rear camera: 13 MP (16 MP on Moto G4 Plus), f2.0 aperture, dual CCT dual tone flash, 1080p video recording @ 30fps, and slow motion record
- Front camera: 5 MP, f2.2
- Display: G4 Play: 5.0" (127 mm) 1280 x 720 (294 ppi) 720p G4, G4 Plus: 5.5" (140 mm) 1920 x 1080 (401 ppi) 1080p with Corning Gorilla Glass 3
- Sound: Front-ported loud speaker, 2-Mics
- Connectivity: Micro USB, 3.5 mm headset jack
- Codename: G4 Play: harpia G4/G4 Plus: athene
- Development status: Discontinued
- Website: www.motorola.com/us/smartphones-moto-g-family

The Moto G4 is a line of Android smartphones manufactured by Motorola Mobility, a subsidiary of Lenovo. It is the successor to the third-generation Moto G, and was first released in Brazil and India on May 17, 2016, with other markets following.

In comparison to the previous single Moto G models, the G4 fragmented the line into three models, with the base model joined by the Moto G4 Play and the Moto G4 Plus with an upgraded camera and a fingerprint reader.

== Specifications ==
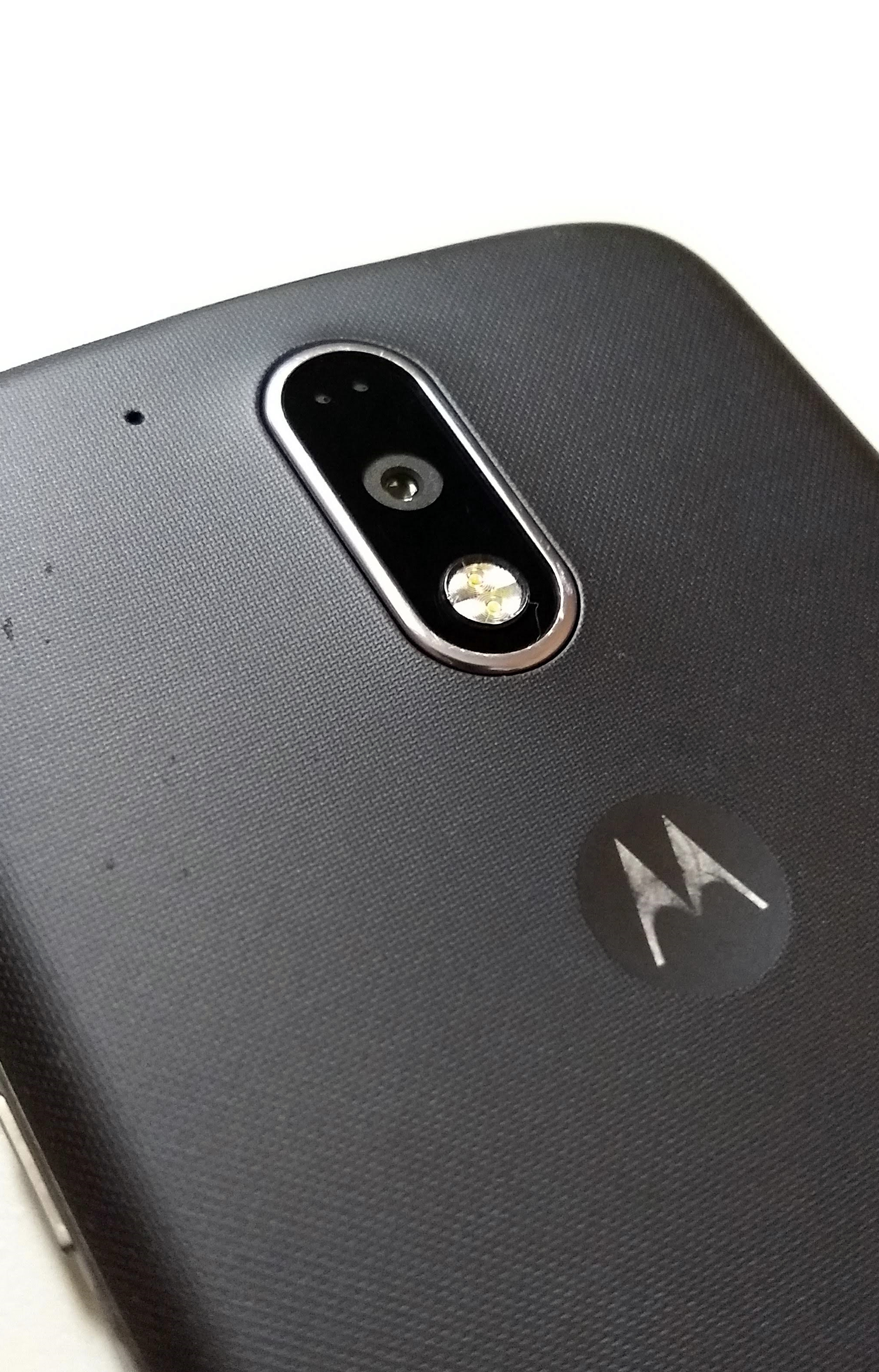
Moto G4 Plus Camera 16 MP dual-pixel

The Moto G4's hardware design was refreshed featuring a "water repellent nano-coating" on the motherboard and a camera protrusion. However, unlike the previous generation Moto G3, the Moto G4 Plus does not feature IPX7 certification. The G4 was available in black and white-colored versions, with different rear-cover and accent-colors available for custom order via MotoMaker. The G4 has a removable back cover which exposes SIM card slots and a MicroSD card slot. The G4 includes a 5.5-inch 1080p display, an octa-core Qualcomm Snapdragon 617 system-on-chip, and 2/3 GB of RAM. The Moto G4 includes either 16 or 32 GB of internal storage expandable via MicroSD. It has a 13-megapixel rear-facing camera and a 5-megapixel front-facing camera. The Moto G4 also supports 802.11n Wi-Fi connectivity and an FM radio receiver.

The device shipped with Android 6.0.1 "Marshmallow". Motorola stated that the Moto G4 line would receive occasional security patches. On December 29, 2016, Motorola began rolling out an update to Android 7.0 "Nougat". In September 2017, Motorola stated that the Moto G4 Plus would receive an update to Android 8.1 "Oreo" although no estimated date was given. An Android 8.1 update was released in February 2019.

== Alternative Android-ROMs ==
Official alternative Android-ROMs for all three G4 models were released by LineageOS, and their support originally was set to end with the final version 14.1 (corresponds to Android 7.1) in September 2018. However, several new unofficial community releases were released afterwards.

On April 1, 2021, the G4 Play was added back to the officially supported list of devices offering an update to Lineage 17.1 (Android 10).

A port of postmarketOS for the G4 Play exists under the code name motorola-harpia.

== Models G4 ==
The Moto G4 is available in a standard model, as well as the Moto G4 Play and Moto G4 Plus. The Play is a low-end model with reduced specifications, as well as an 8-megapixel camera and 720p display. The Plus model is a high-end version that features a 16-megapixel camera with dual-tone flash and infrared auto-focus, as well as an integrated fingerprint reader, up to 4 GB of RAM, and up to 64 GB of internal storage.

The G4 and G4 Play were also sold as part of Amazon.com's Prime Exclusive program, which offered a discounted version of the phone to Amazon Prime subscribers, subsidized by the display of personalized advertising on the lock screen. Due to this, the Prime Exclusive models of the device are ineligible for Motorola's bootloader unlocking program.

== Model comparison ==
Stat	Moto G4 Play		Moto G4	Moto G4 Plus
Model	XT1604 (Europe)	XT1607 (USA); XT1609 (Verizon)	XT1625 (USA, India); XT1622 (Europe)	XT1640 (Brazil); XT1641 (Canada, Mexico); XT1642 (Spain, Australia); XT1643 (India); XT1644 (Canada, USA, India, Europe)
Processor	Snapdragon 410 at 1.2 GHz		Snapdragon 617 at 1.5 GHz	
Processor Cores	4 cores		8 cores (4x 1.5 GHz ARM Cortex-A53, 4x 1.2 GHz ARM Cortex-A53 )	
GPU	Adreno 306 GPU		Adreno 405 GPU	
RAM	1 GB	2 GB		2, 3 or 4 GB
Storage	16 or 32 GB			16, 32, or 64 GB
WiFi/Bluetooth	802.11 b/g/n (2.4 GHz); Bluetooth LE 4.1		802.11 b/g/n (2.4+5 GHz); Bluetooth LE 4.2	
Display Resolution	HD (1280 x 720)		Full HD (1920 x 1080)	
Display Size	5", 294 ppi		5.5", 401 ppi	
Rear Camera	8 MP ( CMOS ) f/2.2 1080p30 video		13 MP ( CMOS ) f/2.0 1080p30 video w/ slow-motion	16 MP ( OmniVision - OV16860 - PureCel ) f/2.0 PDAF and laser autofocus 1080p30 video w/ slow-motion
Front camera	5 MP f/2.2		5 MP ( OmniVision - OV5693 - CMOS BSI ) f/2.2 720p30 video	
Sensor	Proximity Light; Accelerometer		Proximity, Light; Accelerometer	
NFC	Yes	No		
Battery	2800 mAh removable		3000 mAh non-removable w/ TurboPower charging	
Fingerprint reader	No			Yes

== Reception ==
The Moto G4 was lauded as a top budget smartphone, with Android Central concluding that it "represents the ideal experience for an inexpensive Android phone and is a fantastic value." CNET called the G4 an "unbeatable bargain." Others noticed that, unlike the third-generation Moto G, the price of the G4 did not make it much cheaper than more powerful phones.
