= Moto G (2020) =

Android smartphones developed by Motorola Mobility

- Manufacturer: Motorola Mobility
- Type: Smartphone
- Series: Moto G Family
- First released: February 7, 2020
- Successor: Moto G (2021)
- Related: Moto G8
- Form factor: Slate
- Development status: Discontinued
- Website: www.motorola.com/us/smartphones-moto-g-family

Moto G (2020) is a series of Android smartphones that are part of the Moto G family developed by Motorola Mobility, a subsidiary of Lenovo.

== Release ==
The G Power and G Stylus were announced in February 2020, followed by the G Pro in May 2020 and the G Fast in June 2020. The G Power and G Stylus were released in April 2020 for the United States, while the G Fast and G Pro were released in June 2020 for the United States and Europe respectively.

== Specifications ==
Some specifications, such as wireless technologies and storage, vary by region.

Comparison of specifications between the models
	Motorola Moto G Power	Motorola Moto G Stylus	Motorola Moto G Fast	Motorola Moto G Pro
Release date	February 7, 2020	February 7, 2020	June 5, 2020	May 26, 2020
Operating System	Android 10	Android 10 Android 11	Android 10	Android 10 (One Edition) Android 11 Android 12
Display Size	6.4 inches	6.4 inches	6.4 inches	6.4 inches
Display Resolution	FHD+ 1080 x 2300 pixels (19.2:9 at 399 ppi)	FHD+ 1080 x 2300 pixels (19.2:9 at 399 ppi)	HD+ 720 x 1560 pixels (19.5:9 at 268 ppi)	FHD+ 1080 x 2300 pixels (19.2:9 at 399 ppi)
Display Technology	IPS LCD	IPS LCD	IPS LCD	IPS LCD
Refresh Rate	60Hz	60Hz	60hz	60Hz
Screen-body ratio	83%	83.7%	82%	83.7%
Display Cutout	Pinhole	Pinhole	Pinhole	Pinhole
Fingerprint Scanner	Yes, rear-mounted	Yes, rear-mounted	Yes, rear-mounted	Yes, rear-mounted
Battery	5,000 mAh non-removable Li-Po	4,000 mAh non-removable Li-Po	4,000 mAh non-removable Li-Po	4,000 mAh non-removable Li-Po
Charging	USB-C, 10W	USB-C, 10W	USB-C, 10W	USB-C, 15W TurboPower
Processor	Qualcomm Snapdragon 665 (11nm)	Qualcomm Snapdragon 665 (11nm)	Qualcomm Snapdragon 665 (11nm)	Qualcomm Snapdragon 665 (11nm)
CPU	4x2.0 GHz Kryo 260 Gold & 4x1.8 GHz Kryo 260 Silver	4x2.0 GHz Kryo 260 Gold & 4x1.8 GHz Kryo 260 Silver	4x2.0 GHz Kryo 260 Gold & 4x1.8 GHz Kryo 260 Silver	4x2.0 GHz Kryo 260 Gold & 4x1.8 GHz Kryo 260 Silver
Graphics	Adreno 610	Adreno 610	Adreno 610	Adreno 610
Storage	64 GB	128 GB	32 GB	128 GB
Expandable Storage	MicroSDXC up to 512 GB	MicroSDXC up to 512 GB	MicroSDXC up to 512 GB	MicroSDXC up to 512 GB
RAM	4 GB	4 GB	3 GB	4 GB
Front Camera	16 MP HDR	16 MP HDR	8 MP HDR	16 MP HDR
Front Camera Video	1080p@30/120fps	1080p@30fps	1080p@30fps, gyro-EIS	1080p@30fps
Rear Camera	16 MP (wide) with 8 MP (ultrawide) and 2 MP macro LED Flash, HDR, Panorama	48 MP (wide) with 16 MP (ultrawide) and 2 MP macro LED Flash, HDR, Panorama	16 MP (wide) with 8 MP (ultrawide) and 2 MP macro LED Flash, HDR, Panorama	48 MP (wide) with 16 MP (ultrawide) dedicated video camera (1080p) and 2 MP macro LED Flash, HDR, Panorama
Rear Camera Video	4K@30fps or 1080p@30/60fps or 1080p@30fps (gyro-EIS)	4K@30fps or 1080p@30/60/120fps or 1080p@30fps(gyro-EIS)	4K@30fps or 1080p@30/60fps (gyro-EIS)	4K@30fps or 1080p@30/60/120fps or 1080p@30fps (gryo-EIS)
Audio	Stereo Loudspeaker and 3.5mm audio jack	Stereo Loudspeaker and 3.5mm audio jack	Loudspeaker and 3.5mm audio jack	Stereo Loudspeaker and 3.5mm audio jack
Technology (Mobile data)	GSM, CMDA, HSPA, EVODO, LTE	GSM, CMDA, HSPA, EVODO, LTE	GSM, CMDA, HSPA, EVODO, LTE	GSM, HSPA, LTE
Wi-Fi	Wi-Fi 802.11 a/b/g/n/ac and dual band support	Wi-Fi 802.11 a/b/g/n/ac and dual band support	Wi-Fi 802.11 a/b/g/n/ac and dual band support	Wi-Fi 802.11 a/b/g/n/ac and dual band support
Bluetooth	5.0, A2DP, LE	5.0, A2DP, LE	5.0, A2DP, LE	5.0, A2DP, LE
NFC	No	No	No	Yes
Radio	Yes, Radio FM	No	Yes, FM Radio	Yes, FM Radio
USB Data Rate	USB 2.0	USB 2.0	USB 2.0	USB 2.0
Weight	199g	192g	189g	192g
Dimensions	159.9 x 75.8 x 9.6 mm	158.6 x 75.8 x 9.2 mm	161.9 x 75.7 x 9.1 mm	158.6 x 75.8 x 9.2 mm
Colours (alias)	Smoke Black	Mystic Indigo	Pearl White	Mystic Indigo
Model Number	XT2041-4	XT2043; XT2043-4	XT2045-3	XT2043-7
Availability	United States	United States	United States	Europe
