= Moto G7 =

Android smartphone developed by Motorola Mobility

moto g^{7}
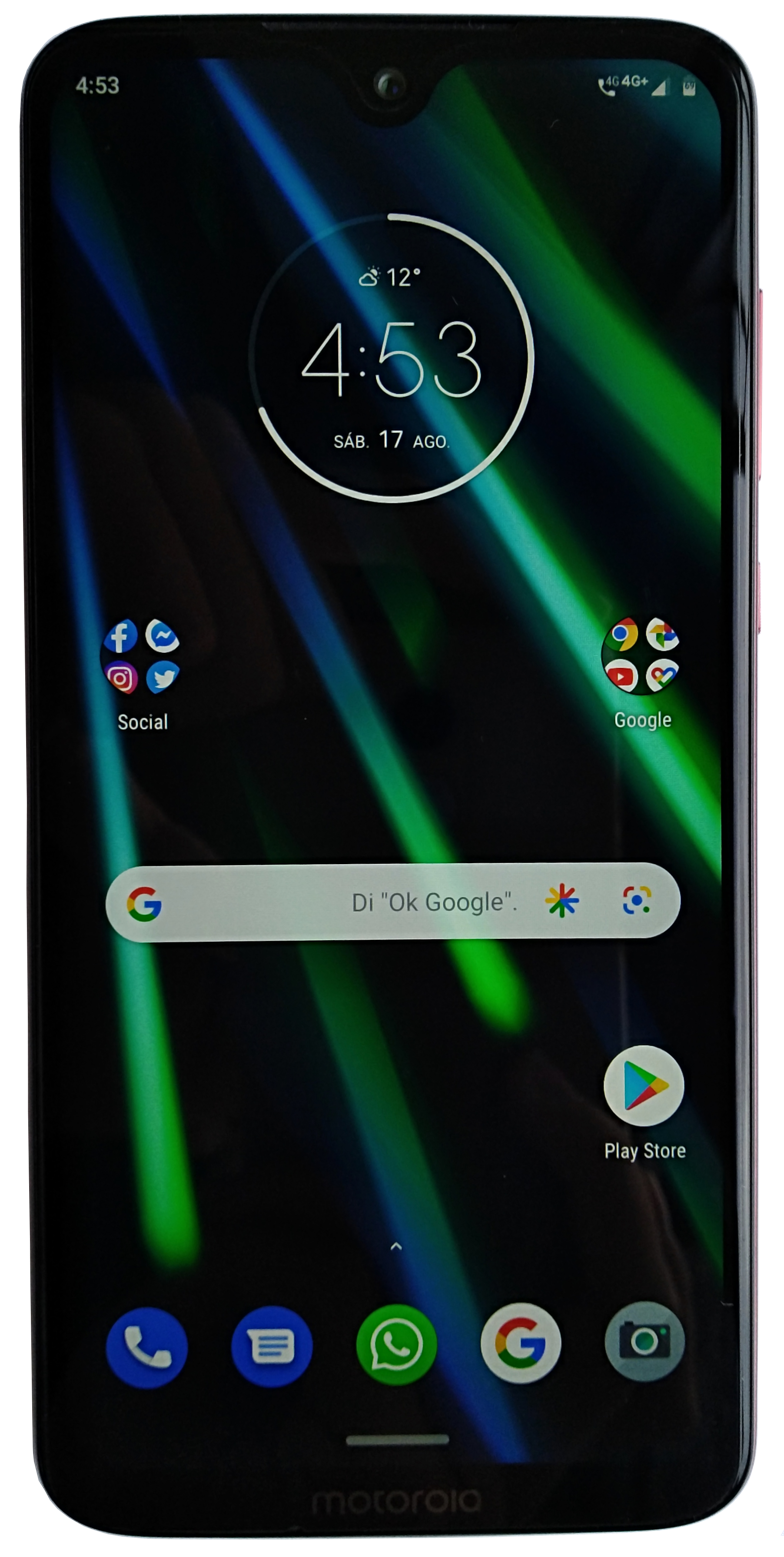
- Moto G7 Plus XT1965-2 LATAM version
- Manufacturer: Motorola Mobility
- Type: Smartphone
- Series: Moto G Family
- First released: 7 February 2019
- Predecessor: Moto G6
- Successor: Moto G8
- Form factor: Slate
- Operating system: Android 9 "Pie", Upgradable to Android 10
- System-on-chip: G7 Play, G7 Power and G7: Snapdragon 632; G7 Plus: Snapdragon 636
- GPU: G7 Play, G7 Power and G7: Adreno 506; G7 Plus: Adreno 509
- Memory: G7 Play: 2 GB LPDDR3; G7 Power and G7: 4GB LPDDR3; G7 Plus: 4GB LPDDR4
- Storage: G7 Play: 32 GB; G7 Power, G7 and G7 Plus: 64 GB
- Removable storage: micro SD expansion slot
- Battery: G7 Play, G7 and G7 Plus: 3000mAh; G7 Power: 5000 mAh
- Rear camera: G7 Play: 13 MP; G7 Power: 12 MP; G7: 12 MP+5 MP; G7 Plus: 16 MP + 5MP
- Front camera: G7 Play, G7 Power and G7: 8 MP; G7 Plus: 12 MP
- Display: G7 Play: 5.7" TFT IPS; G7 Power: 6.2" LTPS IPS; G7 and G7 Plus: 6.24" LTPS IPS
- Sound: Dolby Audio
- Connectivity: 2G EDGE, GPRS/3G HSPA, HSPA+/4G LTE, LTE+ broadcast FM stereo
- Codename: G7 Play: channel G7 Power: ocean G7: river G7 Plus: lake
- Development status: Discontinued
- Hearing aid compatibility: G7: M4/T3; G7 Play: M4/T3; G7 Power: M4/T3
- Website: Moto G7

Moto G7 (stylized by Motorola as moto g^{7}) is a series of Android smartphones developed by Motorola Mobility, a subsidiary of Lenovo. It is the seventh generation of the Moto G family and was first released on 7 February 2019. As with the last generations which introduced the Plus and Play variants, this series has introduced the Power variant as well. There are four variants in the seventh series.The Moto G7 received generally positive reviews for its design and display value.

== Release ==
The G7 was announced on 7 February 2019; it was released on the same day in the Brazil and Mexico markets. It was released on 30 August 2019, in Canada. It was due to be released in the European market on 1 March 2019, however this was delayed until the 15th for unknown reasons. It was due to be released in United States, Australia and Asia after Europe, however no dates had been announced.

The G7 was released in India on 25 March 2019, at a launch price of INR₹17,825 (US$247), alongside an Android One–powered phone, the Motorola One. The other variants of the G7 had yet to be released.

The G7 Power was released in Australia, exclusive to mobile carrier Telstra on 30 April 2019. Gizmodo criticized Telstra's contract pricing for the phone, with the cheapest option costing AU$1,416 over 24 months, despite the price of AU$349 to buy it outright.

The G7 Plus is not available in the United States.

== Variants ==
=== G7 ===
The G7 carries some of the special features of the Plus, while also being on par with the budget G7 Play in other departments. It features a single small notch on the top of the display for the front-facing camera, this does mean it doesn't carry a front facing flash like the G6 did.

=== G7 Play ===
The G7 Play is the least expensive variant of this generation. It has the widest notch in comparison with the other variants, and this means it is the only one with front facing flash. Moto boasts that it has a 60% performance increase compared to the last generation. In the previous generation, its selling feature was the largest battery capacity, 4000 mAh. However, this has been reduced to 3000 mAh. In contrast with other variants, it runs a 32-bit version of the Android operating system.

=== G7 Optimo ===
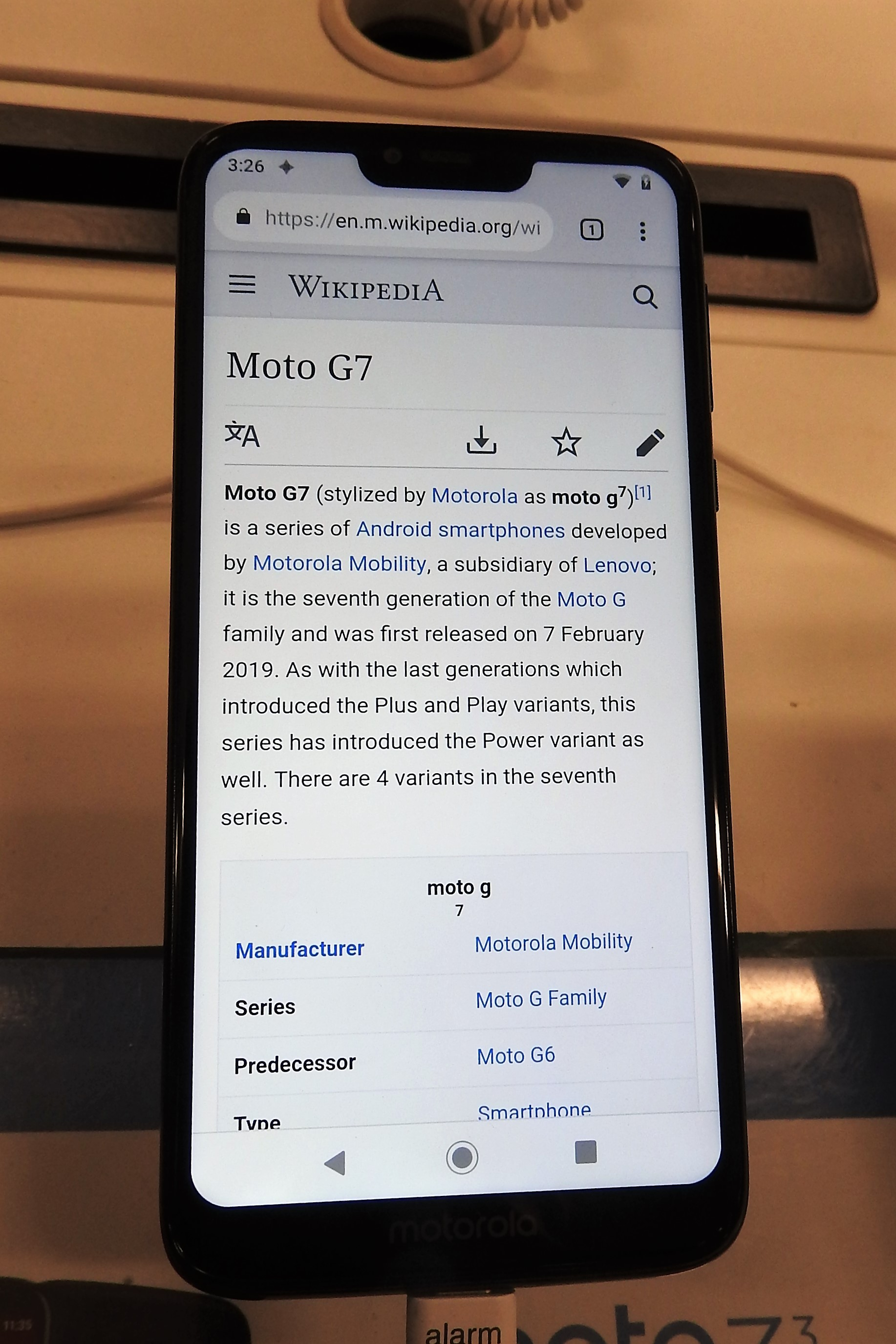
Moto G7 Power

a modified version of the G7 Play specifically for TracFone Wireless

=== G7 Plus ===
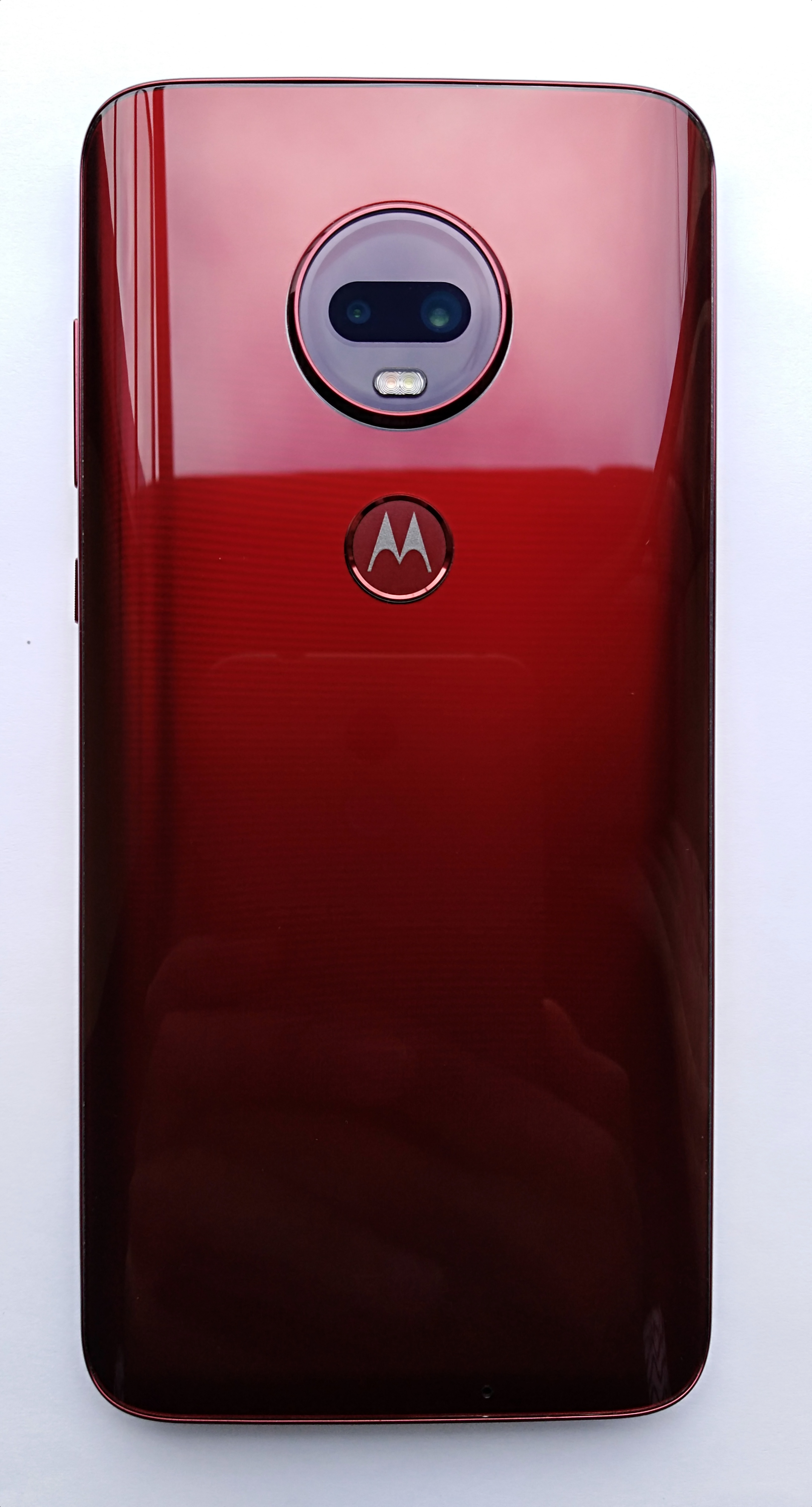
Moto G7 Plus Viva Red Colour

The Plus has not seen many changes from the previous generation. The largest would be the notch and the lack of a front-facing camera LED flash. It can now also charge at 27 W instead of 15 W using the TurboPower Charger, it has stereo speakers, optical image stabilisation and Bluetooth 5.0, however it also has a reduced battery capacity of 3000 mAh instead of 3200 mAh.

=== G7 Power ===
The last-generation G6 Play had a large battery and less powerful specifications, however the G7 Power took this role. The other three models have a 3000 mAh battery, the Power has 5000 mAh. The other specifications fall between those of the G7 Play and G7.

=== G7 Optimo Maxx ===
A modified version of the G7 Power specifically for TracFone Wireless.

== Specifications ==
Some specifications such as wireless technologies and storage will vary between regions. Previously only the Play had its fingerprint scanner on the rear. Due to the larger screen, the fingerprint scanner is now located on the rear of all the phones. Additionally, all G7 variants now have a cutout, or notch, at the top of the screen.

Comparison of specifications between the models
	G7 Play	G7 Power	G7	G7 Plus
Price Euro	€149.99	€209.99	€249.99	€299.99
Price GBP	£149.99	£179.99	£239.99	£269.99
Price INR	Unknown	₹15,999	₹16,999	Unknown
Price USD	$199	$249	$299	Not available in the US
Prize BRL	R$999,000	R$1.399,00	R$1.599,00	R$1.899,00
Price COP	COP$399,900	COP$709,900	COP$635,900	COP$749,900
Price MX$	MX$4,599	MX$5,299	MX$6,599	MX$7,599
Price JPY	Not available in Japan	JPY 25,800	JPY 30,800	JPY 38,800
Release Date	Brazil & Mexico: 7 February 2019 Europe: 15 March 2019 (Delayed from 1 March 2019) India: G7 & G7 Power; 25 March 2019 United States: (G7 & G7 Power) 20 March 2019 and (G7 Play) 5 April 2019 Australia & New Zealand: No release date Japan: (G7 Plus, G7 & G7 Power) 7 June 2019 Canada: (G7 Play) August 2019			
Operating System	Android 9 Pie			
Display Size	5.7in	6.2in	6.24in	
Display Resolution	1512 x 720 @ 19:9		2270 x 1080 @ 19:9	
Display Technology	A-si LCD	LTPS LCD		
Display Notch	Yes, Wide	Yes	Yes, Water Drop	
Processor	Qualcomm Snapdragon 632 processor with 1.8 GHz octa-core			Qualcomm Snapdragon 636 processor with 1.8 GHz octa-core CPU
Graphics	Adreno 506 GPU			Adreno 509 GPU
RAM	2 GB	3 GB (US), 4 GB	4 GB	
Storage	32 GB	32 GB (US) / 64 GB	64 GB	
Expandable Storage	Up to 512 GB			
Wi-Fi	802.11 a/b/g/n 2.4 GHz & 5 GHz		802.11 a/b/g/n 2.4 GHz & 5 GHz	802.11 a/b/g/n/ac 2.4 GHz & 5 GHz
Bluetooth	4.2 LE			5 LE
NFC	No	Yes (Not on US variant)		Yes
GPS	Yes			
Fingerprint Scanner	Yes			
Face Unlock	Yes			
Rear Camera Stills	13 MP f2.0 1.12 um	12 MP f2.0 1.25 um	13 MP f2.0 1.12 um 5 MP depth sensor	16 MP f1.7 1.22 um 5 MP depth sensor
Rear Camera Video	4K @ 30 FPS 1080p @ 30 FPS 720p @ 30 FPS 480p @ 30 FPS		4K @ 30 FPS 1080p @ 60/30 FPS 720p @ 120/30 FPS	4K @ 30 FPS 1080p @ 120/60/30 FPS 720p @ 120/30 FPS
Rear Flash	LED			Dual CCT LED
Front Camera	8 MP f2.2 1.12 um Unknown Recording Specifications		8 MP f2.2 1.12 um 1080p @ 30 FPS 720p @ 30 FPS	12 MP 1.25 um 4K @ 30 FPS 1080p @ 30 FPS 720p @ 30 FPS
Front Camera Flash	LED in notch	Screen Flash		
Audio	1 Speaker 2 Microphones 3.5mm Headphone jack		1 Receiver 1 Bottom Speaker 3 Microphones 3.5 mm headphone jack Supports Dolby Audio	2 Speakers (Stereo) 3 Microphones 3.5 mm headphone jack Supports Dolby Audio
Hearing Aid Compatibility	M4/T3			
Water protection	H2O repellent P2i coat		Water repellent design with P2i nano coating	
Battery	3000 mAh	5000 mAh	3000 mAh	
Advertised battery life	40 Hours	60 Hours	"All-day"	"All-day"
Charging	10 W over USB-C	TurboPower 18 W over USB-C	TurboPower 15 W over USB-C	TurboPower 27 W over USB-C
USB Data Rate	USB 2.0			
Dimensions	148.71 mm × 71.5 mm × 8.09 mm	160.83 mm × 76 mm × 9.4 mm	157 mm × 75.3 mm × 8 mm	157 mm × 75.3 mm × 8.3 mm
Weight	168 g	198 g	172 g	176 g
Colours	Deep Indigo Fine Gold	Marine Blue Ceramic Black (Not in the US); Iced Violet Gradient (Not in the US)	Ceramic Black Clear White	Deep Indigo Viva Red
