= Moto G5 =

Android smartphone developed by Motorola Mobility

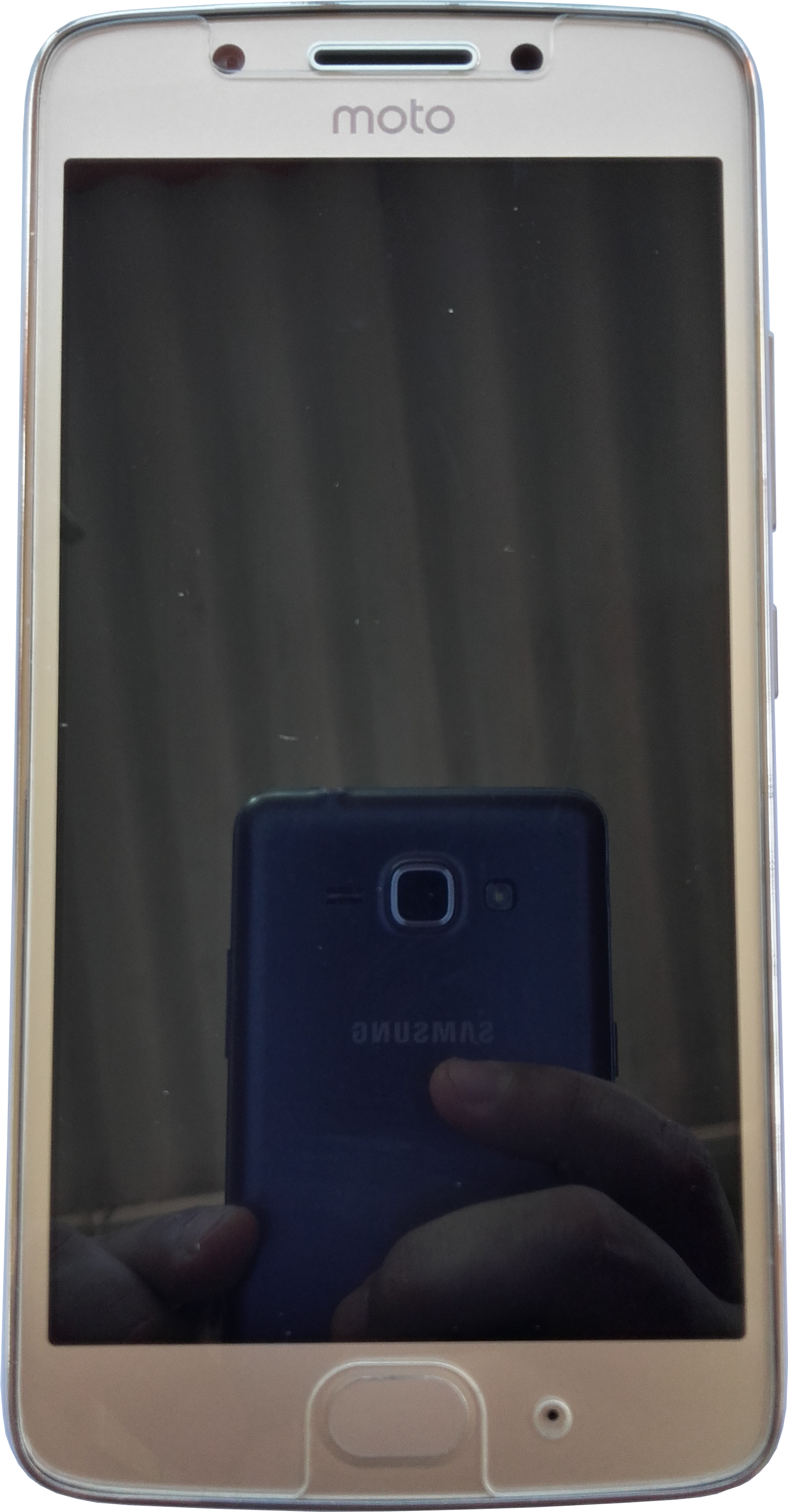
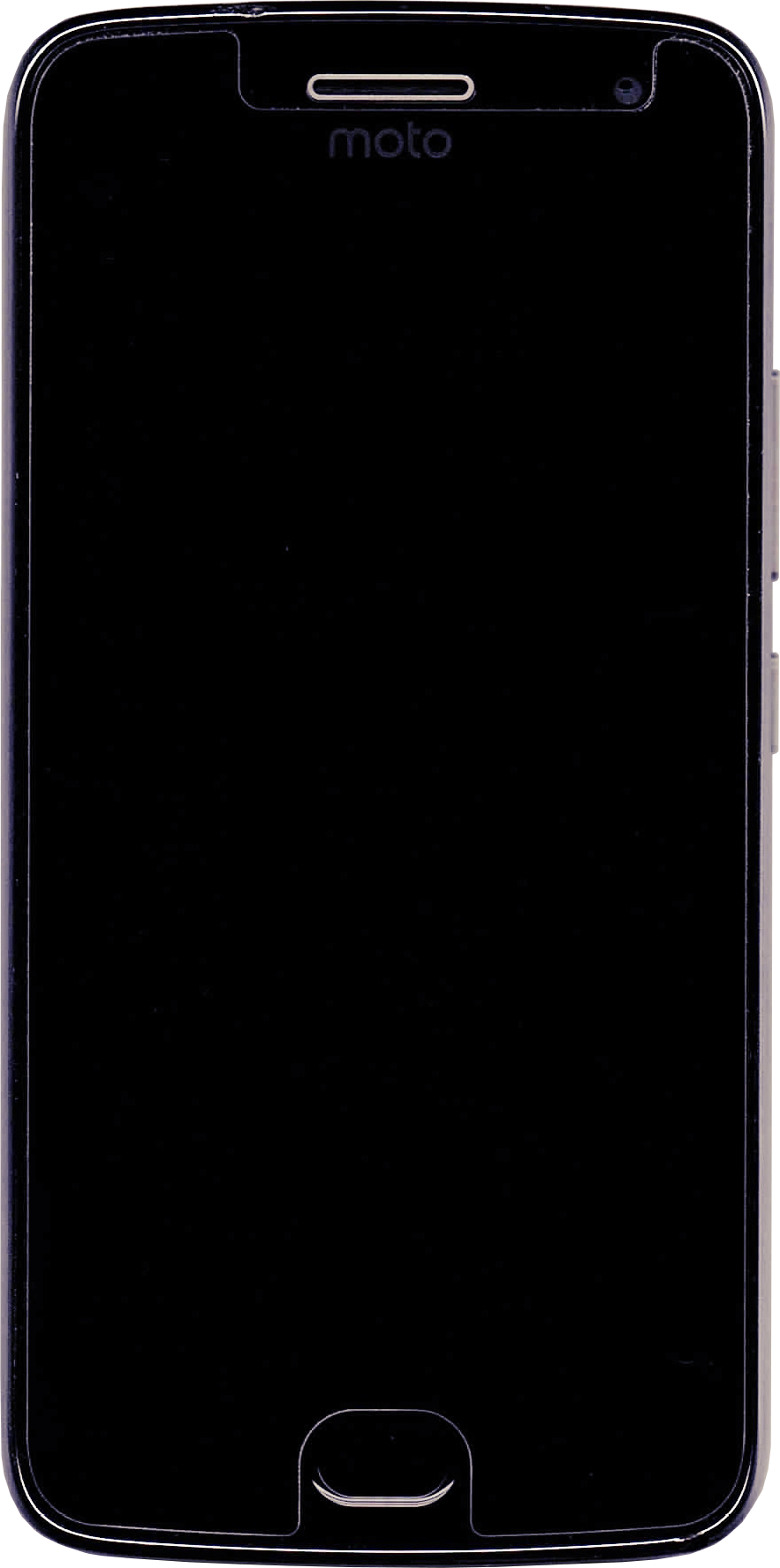
- Brand: Motorola
- Manufacturer: Motorola Mobility
- Type: Smartphone (G5, G5 Plus, and G5S); Phablet (G5S Plus)
- Series: Moto G Family
- Predecessor: Moto G4
- Successor: Moto G6
- Form factor: Slate
- Dimensions: G5: 144 mm (5.7 in) H; 73 mm (2.9 in) W; 9.5 mm (0.37 in) D; G5 Plus: 150 mm (5.9 in) H; 74 mm (2.9 in) W; 9.7 mm (0.38 in) D; G5S: 150 mm (5.9 in) H; 73.5 mm (2.89 in) W; 8.2 mm (0.32 in) D; G5S Plus: 153.5 mm (6.04 in) H; 76.2 mm (3.00 in) W; 9.5 mm (0.37 in) D
- Weight: G5: 145 g; G5 Plus: 155 g; G5S: 157 g; G5S Plus: 168 g
- Operating system: Android 7.0 "Nougat"; Upgradeable to 8.1.0 "Oreo"
- System-on-chip: G5 and G5S: Qualcomm Snapdragon 430; G5 Plus and G5S Plus: Qualcomm Snapdragon 625
- CPU: Octa-core Cortex-A53 (G5 and G5S at 1.4 GHz, G5 Plus and G5S Plus at 2.0 GHz)
- GPU: G5 and G5S: Adreno 505; G5 Plus and G5S Plus: Adreno 506
- Memory: G5: 2 or 3 GB LPDDR3; G5 Plus: 2, 3, or 4 GB LPDDR3; G5S Plus: 3 or 4 GB LPDDR4
- Storage: 16, 32 or 64 GB
- Removable storage: microSD up to 256 GB
- Battery: G5: 2800 mAh removable; G5 Plus, G5S and G5S Plus: 3000 mAh non-removable
- Rear camera: G5: 13 megapixel (G5); G5 Plus: Exmor RS IMX362 Sensor with 12 megapixel resolution; ƒ/1.7 lens with dual-LED flash; G5S:16 megapixel resolution; ƒ/2.0 lens; G5S Plus: 13 megapixel resolution dual-lens; ƒ/2.0 lens with dual-LED flash
- Front camera: G5 and G5 Plus: OmniVision OV5695 Sensor with 5 megapixel resolution and ƒ/2.2 aperture; G5S: 5 megapixel resolution and ƒ/2.0 aperture with LED flash; G5S Plus: 8 megapixel resolution and ƒ/2.0 aperture with LED flash
- Display: G5: 5.0" (127 mm) 1920 × 1080 (441 ppi) IPS LCD; G5 Plus and G5S: 5.2" (132 mm) 1920 × 1080 (424 ppi) IPS LCD; G5S Plus: 5.5" (140 mm) 1920 x 1080 (401 ppi) IPS LCD
- Sound: Front-ported loud speaker, 2-Mics
- Connectivity: Micro USB, 3.5 mm headphone jack
- Data inputs: Multi-touch, capacitive IPS touchscreen; Fingerprint scanner; Accelerometer; A-GPS; GLONASS; GPS; Microphone; Proximity sensor; Glance gesture sensor; Step-counter sensor; Gyroscope and rotation sensors
- Codename: cedric (G5) potter (G5 Plus) montana (G5s) sanders (G5s Plus)
- Hearing aid compatibility: G5 Plus: M4/T4; G5s Plus: M4/T3
- Website: www.motorola.com/us/products/moto-g-family

Moto G5 (stylized as moto g^{5}) is a series of Android smartphones developed by Motorola Mobility, a subsidiary of Lenovo. It is the fifth generation of the Moto G family. Announced as successors to the Moto G4, they were first released in March 2017 in several markets including India and Europe. The original variants are the Moto G5 and Moto G5 Plus, the latter also being available as an Amazon Prime version in the United States. The mid-cycle updates, the Moto G5s and Moto G5s Plus, were released in August 2017.

== Specifications ==
The Moto G5's design was changed, featuring an aluminum casing and flush-mounted camera. The device is available in "lunar gray" and "fine gold" colors, and unlike previous generations is not customizable via MotoMaker. The G5 includes a 1080p display, an octa-core Qualcomm Snapdragon system-on-chip, 2, 3 or 4 GB of RAM, and 16 or 32 GB of internal storage. A dedicated MicroSDXC memory slot is available, supporting up to 128 GB storage expansion. Like previous generations, the device supports gesture and motion controls through Moto Actions. It has a 12- or 13-megapixel rear-facing camera and a 5-megapixel front-facing camera. The device ships with Android 7.0 "Nougat", and received updates up to Android 8.1 "Oreo". It features the same TurboPower charging (15 W) as the G4, providing up to 6 hours of battery life with 15 minutes of charge time. A fingerprint reader is integrated in the home button on the front of the device, which can be also configured to act like a home button or a gesture pad. This was done through the pre-installed system app "Moto".

== Variants ==
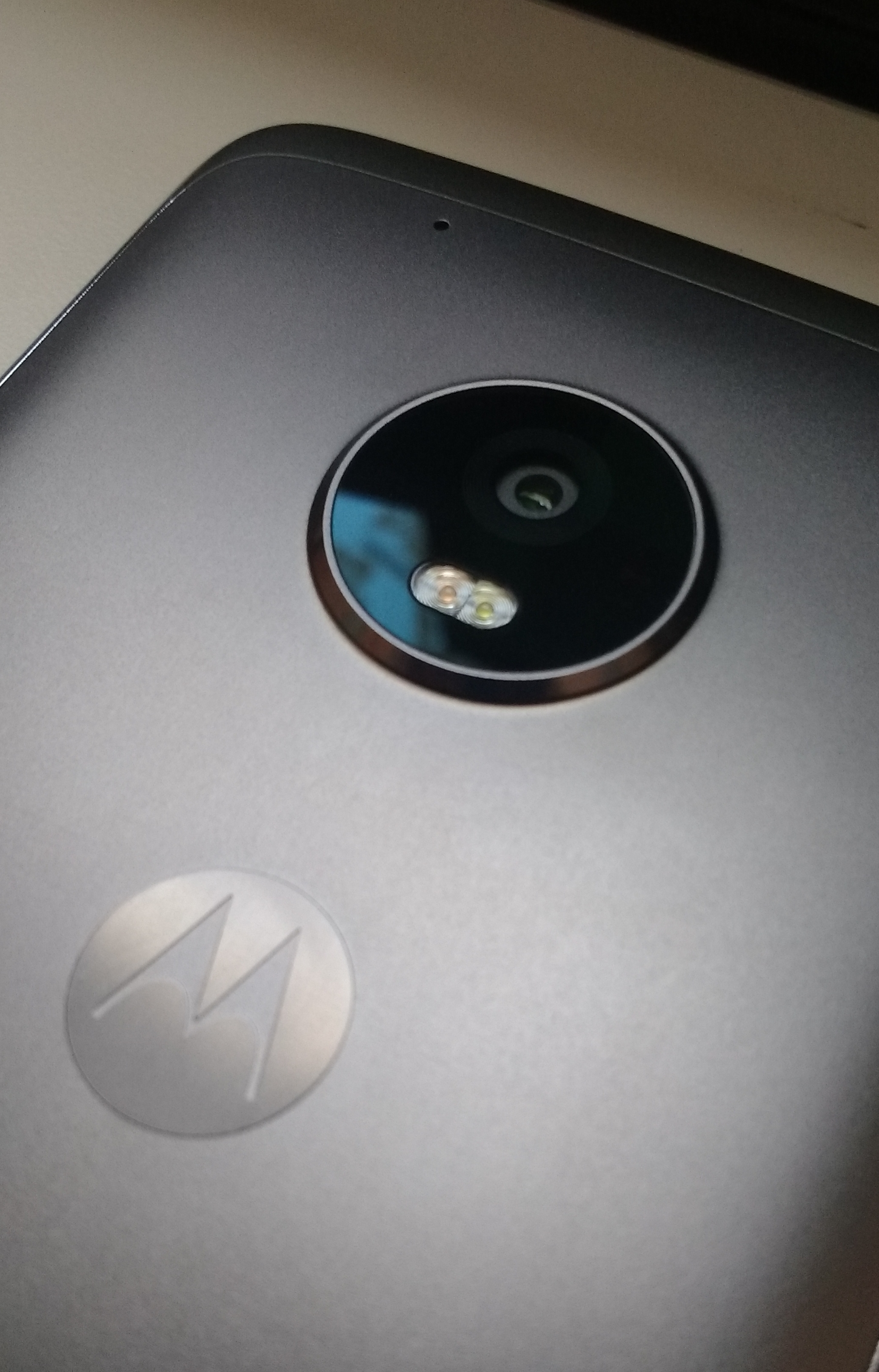
Moto G5 Plus XT1687, showing the camera lens, with a dual-tone flash.

The Moto G5 is the standard variant; and the Moto G5 Plus is a premium variant with improved specifications but a non-replaceable battery. The Moto G5 Plus will not be released in Canada, according to Mobile Syrup. The regular G5 is not available to purchase in the United States

The Moto G5 Plus was released in the United States and internationally; all Plus models apart from American ones have NFC-contactless payment as a feature, but not compasses; US models have the opposite configuration.

As with the previous generation of Moto G4 devices, online retailer Amazon.com offers a 'Prime Exclusive' version of the Moto G5 Plus for Amazon Prime members, which is cheaper than the standard version and features Amazon advertisements on the lock screen.

Unlike the previous generation, the 2800 mAh battery of the basic Moto G5 variant is user-replaceable.

The 'Prime Exclusive' devices hardware is identical; however, unlike most other recent Motorola Android devices, their bootloaders cannot be unlocked, thereby precluding users from installing custom firmware.

=== Model comparison ===
Stat	Moto G5	Moto G5 Plus	
Model	Non-USA		USA
Model	XT1672 (dual SIM 32 GB Brazil); XT1675(single SIM 16 GB); XT1676 (dual SIM)	XT1683 (dual SIM 32 GB Brazil); XT1684; XT1685 (dual SIM)	XT1687
System on chip	Qualcomm Snapdragon 430	Qualcomm Snapdragon 625	
CPU	Octa-core Cortex-A53 up to 1.4 GHz	Octa-core Cortex-A53 up to 2.0 GHz	
GPU	Adreno 505 up to 450 MHz	Adreno 506 up to 650 MHz	
RAM	2 or 3 GB	2 or 4 GB or 3 GB	
Storage	16 or 32 GB	32 or 64 GB	
Display Resolution	Full HD (1920 x 1080)		
Display Size	5.0", 441 ppi	5.2", 424 ppi	
Rear Camera	13 MP (CMOS) ƒ/2.0 PDAF autofocus 1080p30 (max) video	12 MP (CMOS) ƒ/1.7 Dual Autofocus Pixels; 2160p30 (max) video	
Front Camera	5 MP (CMOS) ƒ/2.2		
Sensors	Accelerometer; Gyroscope; Ambient light Proximity		Accelerometer; Gyroscope; Ambient light Proximity; Compass
NFC	No	Yes	No
Battery	2800 mAh removable	3000 mAh non-removable	
Fingerprint Reader	Yes		

=== Moto G5S and G5S Plus ===
On 1 August 2017, Motorola unveiled the 'special edition' Moto G5S and Moto G5S Plus. These also have an aluminum unibody design. The specifications of the Moto G5S include a non-replaceable 3,000 mAh battery, a 1080p 5.2-inch display, 16 MP rear camera, the same 5 MP front camera with flash and a 1.4 GHz octa-core processor. On the other hand, the G5S Plus features 5.5-inch display, Snapdragon 2.0 GHz processor, and a new 13 MP dual-lens camera setup. Both versions support a fingerprint sensor. Both devices are upgradable to Android Oreo 8.1.0.

Stat	Moto G5S	Moto G5S Plus	
Model	XT1792 (Brazil); XT1793 (Europe); XT1794 (Europe/India); XT1797 (Asia)	XT1802 (Brazil); XT1803 (Europe); XT1804 (India); XT1805 (Europe, dual SIM)	XT1806 (USA)
System on chip	Qualcomm Snapdragon 430	Qualcomm Snapdragon 625	
CPU	Octa-core Cortex-A53 up to 1.4 GHz	Octa-core Cortex-A53 up to 2.0 GHz	
GPU	Adreno 505 up to 450 MHz	Adreno 506 up to 650 MHz	
RAM	3 GB	3 or 4 GB	
Storage	32 GB	32 or 64 GB	
Display Resolution	Full HD (1920 x 1080)		
Display Size	5.2", 424 ppi	5.5", 403 ppi	
Rear Camera	16 MP (CMOS) ƒ/2.0 PDAF autofocus 1080p30 video	Dual 13 MP (CMOS) ƒ/2.0 4K UHD (2160p30)	
Front Camera	5 MP (CMOS) ƒ/2.0	8 MP (CMOS) ƒ/2.0	
Sensors	Accelerometer; Gyroscope; Ambient light Proximity		Accelerometer; Gyroscope; Ambient light Proximity; Compass
NFC	Yes	Yes	No
Battery	3000 mAh non-removable		
Fingerprint Reader	Yes		

== Reception ==
The Moto G5 lineup received positive reviews, although many considered that the regular G5 (low-end model) was not a true successor to the Moto G4 in terms of its features and CPU performance (the G5 used the 1.4 GHz Snapdragon 430, whilst the G4 used the 1.5 GHz Snapdragon 617). The Moto G5 was regarded as a disappointment by Alphr, saying previous Moto G phones had been considered the best budget phones at the time of their respective release. On the other hand, the G5 Plus and G5S Plus (and to a lesser extent, the G5S) were praised for their large improvements in performance, battery life, camera quality, and storage capacity. Android Central thought that the G5S Plus was not a significant upgrade over the G5 Plus, finding that while the G5S Plus adds an upgraded front-facing camera with LED flash and a metal unibody, its rear camera module they considered a regression from that of the G5 Plus due to a narrower aperture (F2.0 versus F1.7).

== Further information ==
- Android Authority Review (G5 Plus)
