= Moto X4 =

Android smartphone developed by Motorola Mobility

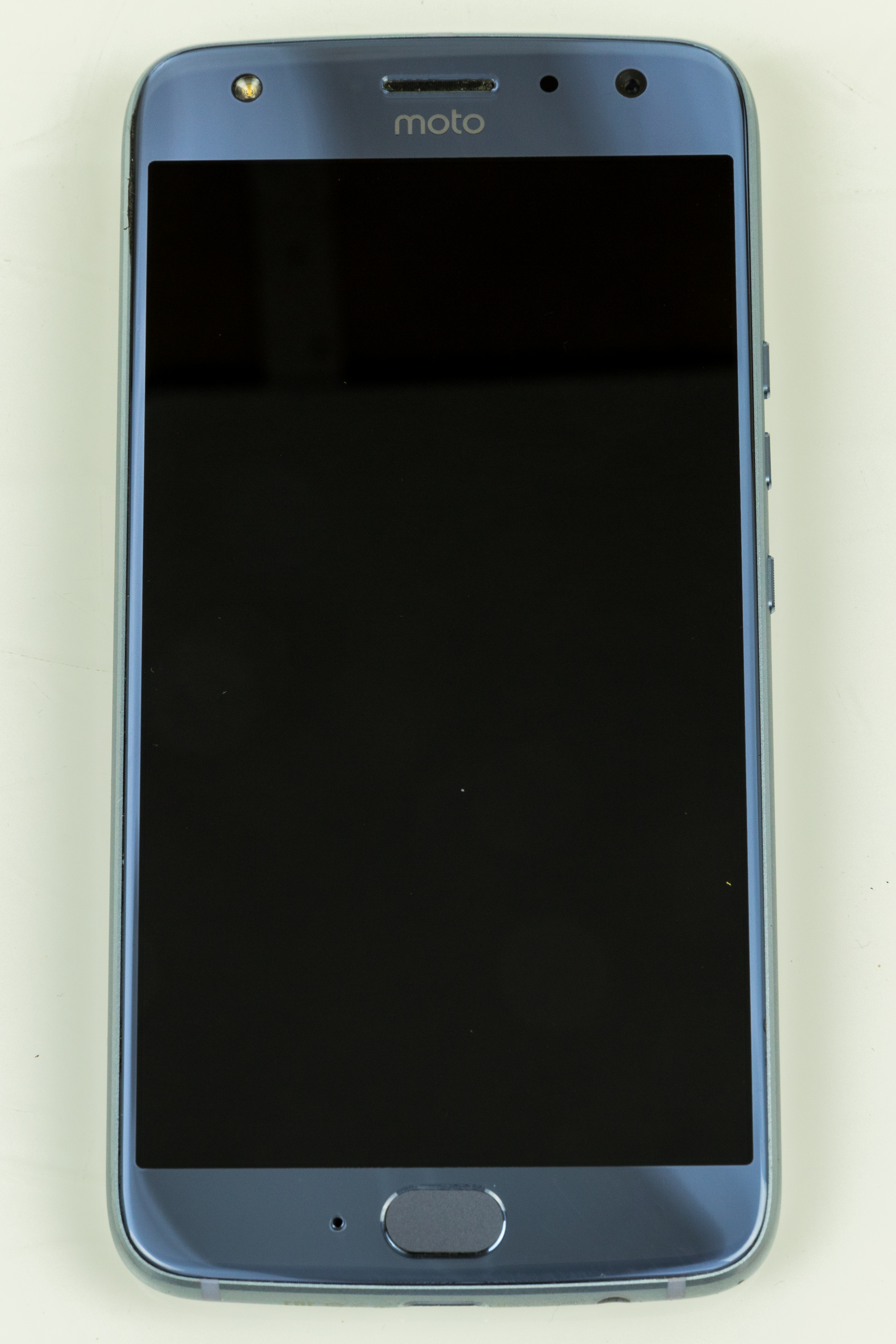
- Brand: Moto
- Manufacturer: Motorola Mobility
- Type: Smartphone
- Series: Motorola Moto
- First released: September 1, 2017
- Availability by region: United Kingdom, France, Germany, India September 22, 2017; Australia September 27, 2017; India November 14, 2017
- Predecessor: Moto X Style; Moto X Force/Droid Turbo 2 Moto X Play
- Successor: Motorola One; Motorola Edge series
- Compatible networks: 4G LTE (Cat11 DL, Cat5 UL), CDMA / EVDO Rev A, UMTS / HSPA+, GSM / EDGE 2G: GSM band 2/3/5/8 CDMA BC 0/1/10; 3G: WCDMA band 1/2/4/5/8; 4G: FDD LTE band 1/2/3/4/5/7/8/12/13/17/20/25/26/28/66 TDD LTE band 38/41 LATAM model: 4G LTE (Cat13 DL, Cat5 UL), UMTS / HSPA+, GSM / EDGE; 2G: GSM band 2/3/5/8; 3G: WCDMA band 1/2/4/5/8; 4G: FDD LTE band 1/2/3/4/5/7/12/17/28/66 EMEA model: 4G LTE (Cat13 DL, Cat5 UL), UMTS / HSPA+, GSM / EDGE; 2G: GSM band 2/3/5/8; 3G: WCDMA band 1/2/4/5/8; 4G: FDD LTE band 1/3/4/5/7/8/20/28 TDD LTE band 38/40/41(AXGP+China) APAC model: 4G LTE (Cat11 DL, Cat5 UL), UMTS / HSPA+, GSM / EDGE; 2G: GSM band 2/3/5/8; 3G: WCDMA band 1/2/4/5/8/19 4G: FDD LTE band 1/2/3/4/5/7/8/18/19/26/28 TDD LTE band 38/40/41
- Dimensions: 148.35 mm (5.841 in) H 73.4 mm (2.89 in) W 7.99 mm (0.315 in) D
- Weight: 163 g (5.7 oz)
- Operating system: Android 7.1 Nougat, upgradable to Android Pie
- System-on-chip: Qualcomm Snapdragon 630
- CPU: 2.2 GHz octa-core (Snapdragon 630)
- GPU: 650 MHz Adreno 508 (Snapdragon 630)
- Memory: 3 GB (LPDDR3); 4 GB (LPDDR4); 6 GB (LPDDR4)
- Storage: 32 GB / 64 GB
- Removable storage: microSD up to 2 TB
- Battery: 3000 mAh non-removable
- Rear camera: Dual Lens - 12MP Dual Autofocus Pixel sensor (f/2.0, 1.4 μm); 8 MP ultra-wide angle with 120° field of view sensor (f/2.2, 1.12 μm)
- Front camera: 16 MP (f/2.0, 1 μm) and front flash
- Display: 5.2 in (130 mm) 1920 × 1080 (16∶9, 424 px/in); LTPS IPS LCD
- Sound: 3.5 mm headphone jack front-facing speaker 3 microphones: one to the left of the fingerprint scanner, one on the bottom of the back side, and one on the top side of the phone Bluetooth support for connection to up to 5 speakers at the same time
- Connectivity: USB-C, NFC, Bluetooth 5.0 BR/EDR + BLE, Wi-Fi 802.11a/b/g/n/ac, 2.4 GHz + 5 GHz
- Data inputs: Touch screen, fingerprint reader
- Model: XT1900
- Other: Corning Gorilla Glass 3
- Website: https://www.motorola.com/us/products/moto-x-gen-4

Moto X4 is a mid-range Android smartphone developed by Motorola Mobility, a subsidiary of Lenovo. Unveiled on August 31, 2017, at IFA, it is a revival of the previously discontinued Moto X line. It was released in Europe at the end of September 2017.

In the United States, an Android One version of the device was also released, marking the first device to be released in the US as part of the Android One program. In 2018, Motorola launched the Motorola One lineup as upper mid-range replacements for the Moto X4.

== Specifications ==
=== Hardware ===
The Moto X4 is equipped with a 5.2 in (130 mm) 1920 × 1080 IPS display. It comes in two colors: Super Black and Sterling Blue. The camera assembly protrudes from the body, as on almost all Motorola smartphones in production. The fingerprint sensor is an oval on the front. The front has a front-facing camera with flash, LED notification light, and the proximity sensor in the top bezel. The back has the dual camera at the top and one of the secondary noise-cancellation microphones at the bottom. The sides are an aluminium frame, which holds the front and back glass. The phone's USB type C charging port has a USB-OTG function, supported by a USB type C OTG connector. Its Moto Turbopower fast-charging technology can add about 5 hours of battery life with 15–20 minutes of charging. It also has a 3.5 mm headphone jack at the bottom along with the manufacturing details. The SIM-card tray can support either two nano SIM cards or a nano SIM card and a microSD card of up to 2 TB of capacity. The phone is IP68 rated.

=== Memory and Storage ===
The Moto X4 comes in three memory variants: 3 GB / 32 GB, 4 GB / 64 GB, and 6 GB / 64 GB.

=== Processor ===
The Moto X4 uses the Qualcomm Snapdragon 630 SoC at 2.2 GHz, and the Adreno 508 GPU at 650 MHz. Together, these provide a decent performance in terms of general browsing. Most games supported by the hardware run without lag.

=== Battery ===
The Moto X4 comes with a 3000 mAh Li-ion non-removable battery that Motorola claims can provide a full day of usage. Users typically report the same, with a few exceptions. Along with the Moto Turbopower technology, the battery performance of the phone is good.

=== Camera ===
The device features a dual rear camera, in a raised circular camera bump. It contains a 12 MP f/2.0 1.4 μm dual autofocus pixel sensor combined with an 8 MP f/2.2 1.12 μm wide-angle sensor which has a 120° field-of-view. The dual camera system allows the camera to use depth effects, selective focus and black and white and background replacement. The rear camera has a color-corrected–temperature dual LED flash.

The front-facing camera is a 16 MP f/2.0 1 μm sensor with a front-facing LED flash. It also has a 4 MP adaptive night mode for low light levels, with the new system update enabling the portrait mode for it as well.

=== Software ===
The X4 launched with Android Nougat version 7.1 and can be updated (in most regions) to Android 9.0 Pie. The Prime Exclusive model currently is sold running Android Oreo. It also contains Amazon's Alexa voice assistant in addition to the standard Google Assistant offered in all android phones and Motorola's own assistant Moto Voice. It also has several other Moto experiences; one-button-nav, Moto Display, Moto Actions, Moto Key and wireless sound system.

Android 9.0 Pie upgrade rollout began December 17, 2018 in the US and most other regions, including some European regions. The UK got Pie on June 24, 2019. Some may still be "pending".

Although the default Camera app does not provide support for Photo Sphere photos, Photo Sphere images may be taken through use of the Google Street View app. Normal Panorama images may be taken with the Camera app, however.

=== Android One version ===
The Moto X4 Android One edition is the first device to be released as part of the Android One program in the United States. It is only available in the US and works on Google's Project Fi network, which had previously been exclusive to Google's own Nexus or Pixel phones. The Android One version does not include the Amazon Alexa assistant and some Motorola software additions, and will receive Android updates from Motorola faster than the regular version of the device.

== Release supply issues ==
The X4 was originally made available to buy on September 21, 2017, in France, Germany, and the United Kingdom via the Motorola website, and proved popular with many customers ordering it within a few days of release. However, Motorola was unable to meet the demand due to manufacturing and shipping issues, with many customers having their orders cancelled and refunded after the expected delivery dates. It has since been removed from sale in some countries or is showing as out of stock in others. Project Fi X4's were also hit by the issues and customers who had made pre-orders were contacted, delaying their delivery dates by around 2 weeks. The launch of the phone in India was also postponed, having originally been planned for 3 October.
