= Motorola Moto =

Trademark owned by Motorola Trademark Holdings, LLC

Motorola Moto is a range of Android mobile devices manufactured by Motorola Mobility, a subsidiary of Lenovo since 2014. This article lists the various Moto device series, as well as the discontinued series.

The Moto brand is also used and marketed for certain public-safety products from Motorola Solutions and for Motorola brand licensees' home products and mobile accessories.

== Moto G ==
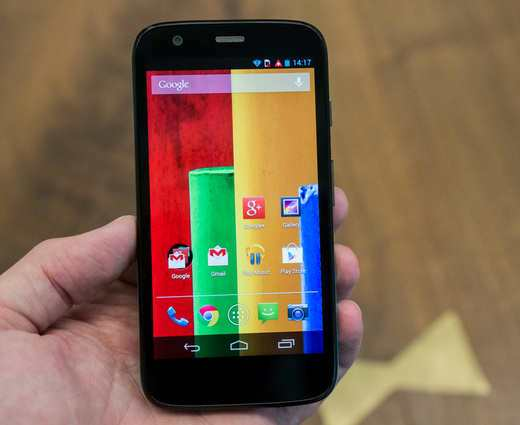
Moto G (1st generation)

The Moto G is low-end to mid-range. The brand was developed to target consumers with lower income levels, particularly in developing countries. Moto G was a full-featured but modestly priced smartphone, priced as low as 100 euros, introduced primarily for emerging markets such as Brazil, India, and the Middle East. The Moto G's low cost also made it appealing to cost-conscious consumers in developed markets like the United States and Europe.

- Moto G (1st generation) (2013)
  - Moto G Colors Edition (2013)
  - Moto G 2014 LTE (2014)
  - Moto G 4G (2014)
  - Moto G 4G LTE (2014)
  - Moto G Ferrari Edition (2014)
  - Moto G Google Play Edition (2014)
- Moto G (2nd generation) (2014)
- Moto G (3rd generation) (2015)
- Moto G4 (2016)
- Moto G4 Play (2016)
- Moto G4 Plus (2016)
- Moto G5 (2017)
- Moto G5 Plus (2017)
- Moto G5S (2017)
- Moto G5S Plus (2017)
- Moto G6 (2018)
- Moto G6 Play (2018)
- Moto G6 Plus (2018)
- Moto G7 (2019)
- Moto G7 Play (2019)
- Moto G7 Power/Optimo Maxx /Supra (2019)
- Moto G7 Plus (2019)
- Moto G8 Play (2019)
- Moto G8 Plus (2019)
- Moto G8 (2020)
- Moto G8 Power (2020)
- Moto G8 Power Lite (2020)
- Moto G7 Optimo (2020)
- Moto G 2020 line:
  - Moto G Fast (2020)
  - Moto G Power (2020)
  - Moto G Stylus/G Pro (2020)
  - Moto G 5G Plus (2020)
- Moto G9 Play/G9 (2020)
- Moto G9 Plus (2020)
- Moto G9 Power (2020)
- Moto G 2021 line:
  - Moto G 5G (2021)
  - Moto G Pure (2021)
  - Moto G Play (2021)
  - Moto G Power (2021)
  - Moto G Stylus (2021)
  - Moto G Stylus 5G (2021)
- Moto G10 (2021)
- Moto G10 Power (2021)
- Moto G20 (2021)
- Moto G30 (2021)
- Moto G40 Fusion (2021)
- Moto G50 (2021)
- Moto G50 5G (2021)
- Moto G60 (2021)
- Moto G60S (2021)
- Moto G100 (2021)
- Moto G 2022 line:
  - Moto G Power (2022)
  - Moto G 5G (2022)
  - Moto G Stylus (2022)
  - Moto G Stylus 5G (2022)
- Moto G31 (2022)
- Moto G41 (2022)
- Moto G51 5G (2022)
- Moto G71 5G (2022)
- Moto G200 5G (2022)
- Moto G22 (2022)
- Moto G52 (2022)
- Moto G52j (2022)
- Moto G82 (2022)
- Moto G62 (2022)
- Moto G32 (2022)
- Moto G72 (2022)
- Moto G 2023 line:
  - Moto G Play (2023) (released 2022)
  - Moto G 5G (2023)
  - Moto G Power 5G (2023)
  - Moto G Stylus (2023)
  - Moto G Stylus 5G (2023)
- Moto G53 5G (2023)
- Moto G13 (2023)
- Moto G23 (2023)
- Moto G53j/G53s/G53y (2023)
- Moto G73 5G (2023)
- Moto G14 (2023)
- Moto G34 5G (2023)
- Moto G84 (2023)
- Moto G54 (2023)
- Moto G54j/G54j 5G (2023)
- Moto G54 (India)/G54 Power Edition (2023)
- Moto G04 (2024)
- Moto G04s (2024)
- Moto G24 (2024)
- Moto G24 Power (2024)
- Moto G64 (2024)
- Moto G35 (2024)
- Moto G45 (2024)
- Moto G55 (2024)
- Moto G75 (2025)
- Moto G85 (2024)
- Moto G 2024 line:
  - Moto G Play (2024)
  - Moto G 5G (2024)
  - Moto G Power 5G (2024)
  - Moto G Stylus 5G (2024)
- Moto G05 (2025)
- Moto G (2025) line:
  - Moto G (2025)
  - Moto G Power (2025)
  - Moto G Stylus (2025)
- Moto G15 (2025)
- Moto G56 (2025)
- Moto G86 (2025)
- Moto G86 Power (2025)
- Moto G96 (2025)
- Moto G06 (2025)
- Moto G06 Power (2025)
- Moto G67 (2025)
- Moto G67 Power (2025)
- Moto G57 (2025)
- Moto G57 Power (2025)
- Moto G Play (2026)
- Moto G (2026)
- Moto G17 (2026)
- Moto G17 Power (2026)
- Moto G67 (2026)
- Moto G77 (2026)

== Discontinued series ==
=== Moto ===
Moto is low-end to mid-range.

- Moto i776 (2008)
- Moto i776w (2008)
- MOTO XT702 (2009)

=== Moto C ===
Moto C is low-end.

- Moto C (2017)
- Moto C Plus (2017)

=== Moto E ===
Moto E is a low-end lineup. Several newer models run on Android Go operating system. As of 2026, the lineup is not offered in certain regions, being mostly supplanted by Moto G0x and G1x series.

- Moto E (1st generation) (2014)
- Moto E (2nd generation) (2015)
- Moto E3 (2016)
- Moto E3 Power (2016)
- Moto E4 (2017)
- Moto E4 Plus (2017)
- Moto E5 (2018)
- Moto E5 Play (2018)
- Moto E5 Plus (2018)
- Moto E6 (2019)
- Moto E6 Play (2019)
- Moto E6 Plus (2019)
- Moto E6s (2020)
- Moto E (2020)
- Moto E7 (2020)
- Moto E7 Plus (2020)
- Moto E6i (2021)
- Moto E7 Power (2021)
- Moto E7i Power (2021)
- Moto E20 (2021)
- Moto E30 (2021)
- Moto E40 (2021)
- Moto E22 (2022)
- Moto E22s (2022)
- Moto E32 (2022)
- Moto E13 (2023)
- Moto E14 (2024)
- Moto E15 (2025)

=== Moto M ===
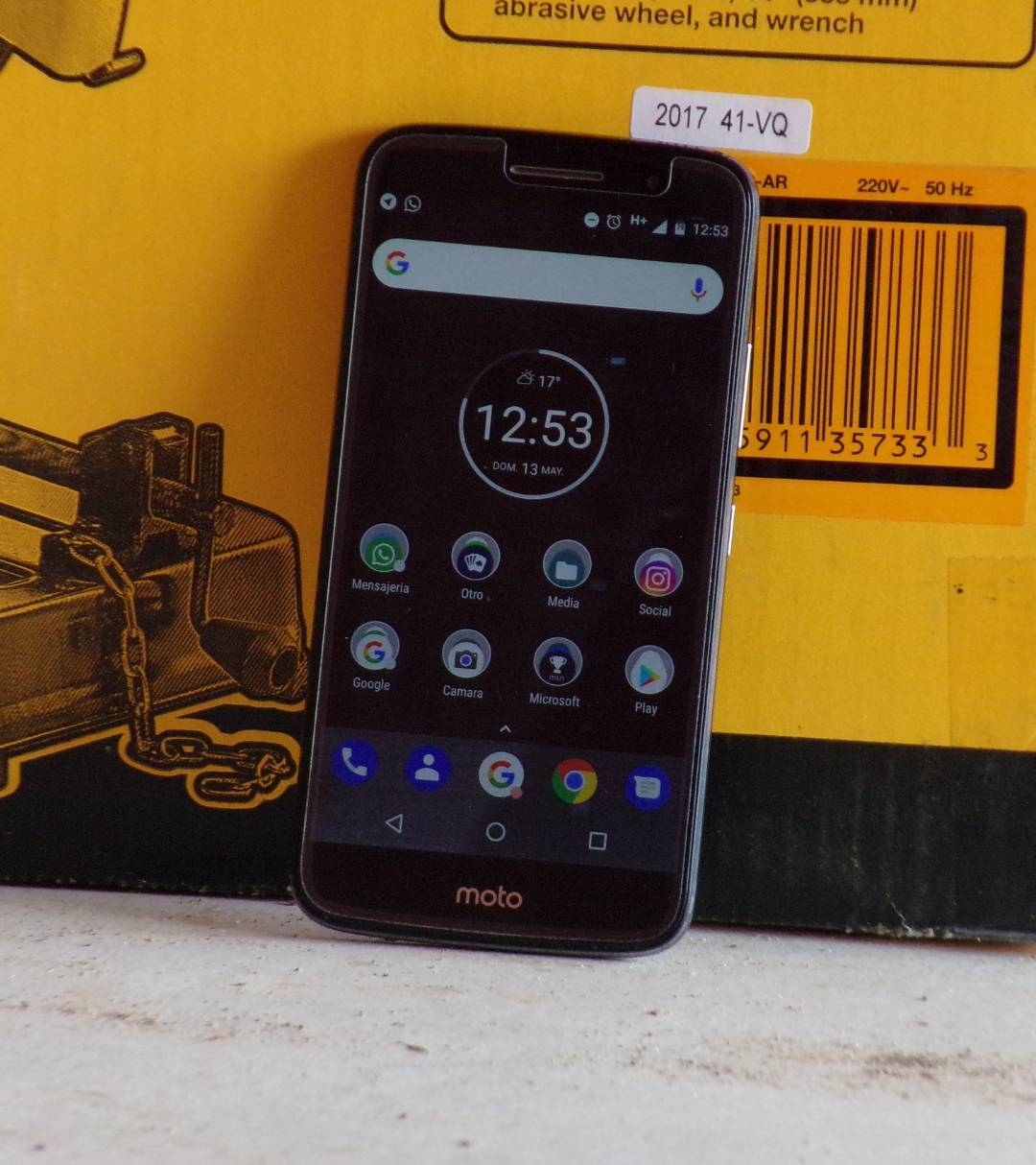
Moto M

Moto M is mid-range.

- Moto M (2016)

=== Moto S ===
Moto S is mid-range, and based on certain Motorola Edge models.

- Moto S30 Pro (2022)
- Moto S50 (2024)
- Moto S50 Neo (2024)

=== Moto X ===
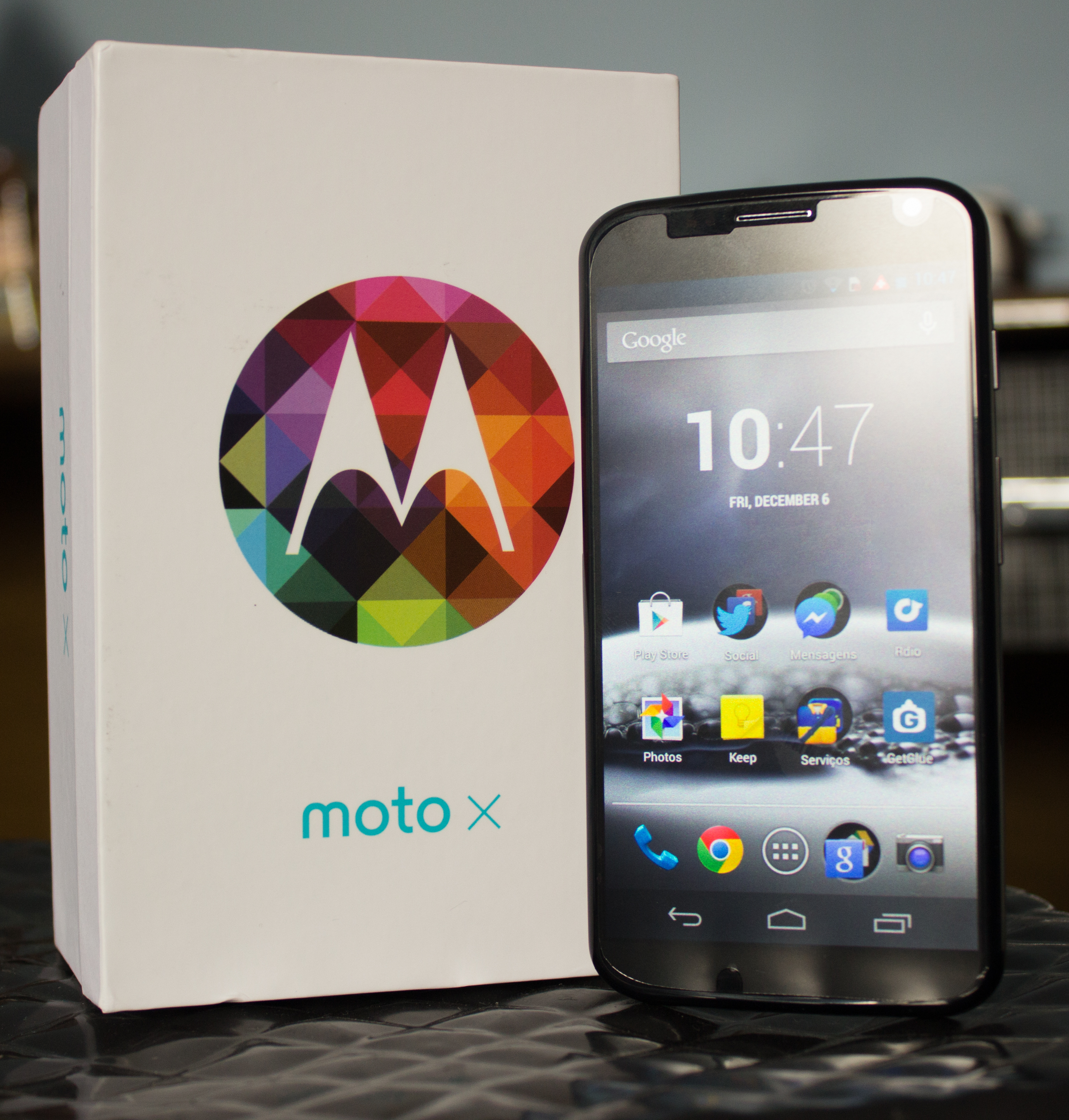
Moto X (1st generation)

Moto X is mid-range to high-end, preceding the Motorola Edge. Although the lineup ended in 2017, the Moto X line is revived for the Chinese market starting in 2022 as rebranded variants of certain Edge models.

- Moto X (1st generation) (2013)
- Moto X (2nd generation) (2014)
- Moto X Play (2015)
- Moto X Style (2015)
- Moto X4 (2017)
- Moto X30 Pro (2022)
- Moto X40 (2023)
- Moto X50 Ultra (2024)
- Moto X70 Air (2025)

=== Moto Z ===
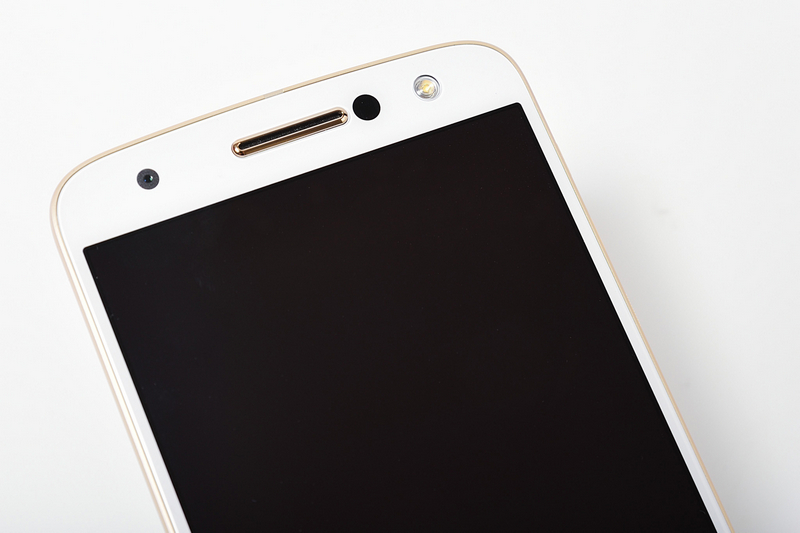
Motorola Moto Z

Moto Z is mid-range to high-end.

- Moto Z (2016)
- Moto Z Play (2016)
- Moto Z Force (2016)
- Moto Z2 Play
- Moto Z2 Force Edition (2017)
- Moto Z3 (2018)
- Moto Z3 Play (2018)
- Moto Z4 (2019)

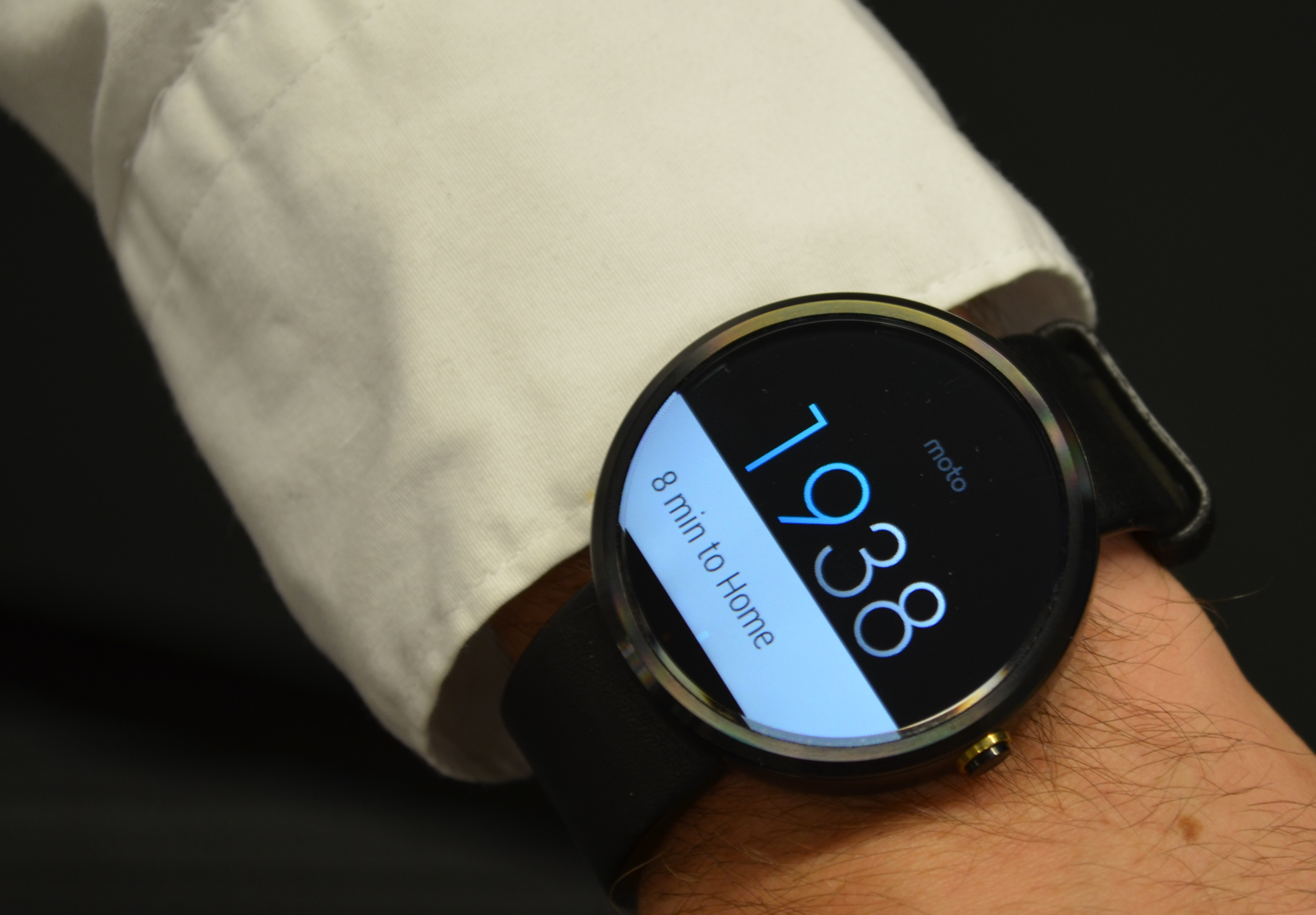
Moto 360 watch running Android Wear

=== Moto 360 ===
Moto 360 is a range of smartwatches.

- Moto 360 (1st generation) (2014)
- Moto 360 (2nd generation) (2015)
- Moto 360 (3rd generation) (2019)

== Motorola Solutions products ==
- MOTOTRBO digital mobile radios
  - XiR series
  - DP series
  - ATS series
  - XTS series
  - XPR series
  - R series
  - ION Smart Radio
  - SLR series repeaters
- MOTOBRIDGE radio interoperability platform
- MOTOTLKR consumer walkie-talkies.

== See also ==
- Motorola Edge
- Motorola One
- Motorola Razr
- Motorola Droid
