= Motorola Edge series =

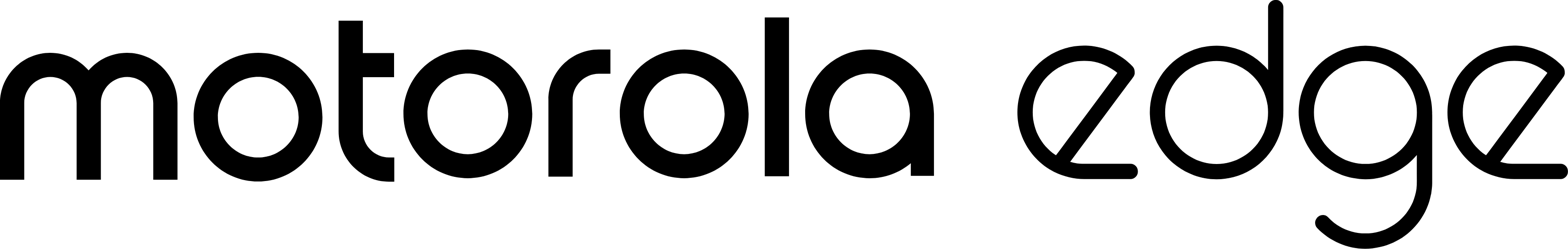
- Developer: Motorola Mobility
- Type: Smartphones
- Released: 22 April 2020; 6 years ago
- System on a chip: Qualcomm Snapdragon (2020–present); MediaTek (2021–present)
- Related: Moto G series Moto S series Moto X series

The Motorola Edge series (stylized in all lowercase; known as the Moto Edge series in China) is a line of smartphones marketed by Motorola Mobility since 2020, replacing the Moto X as the company's mid-range and high-end lineup. Various models have been produced which are listed below:

- edge (2020)
- edge+ (2020)
- edge S/moto g100 (2021)
- edge 20 Lite
- edge 20 Fusion
- edge 20
- edge 20 PRO/edge S PRO (PRC)
- edge (2021)
- edge S30 (PRC)
- edge X30 (PRC)
- edge (2022)
- edge+ (2022)
- edge 30 (2022)
- edge 30 PRO (2022)
- edge 30 ULTRA (2022)
- edge 30 FUSION
- edge 30 NEO
- edge 40 (2023)
- edge 40 PRO/edge+ (2023) (US)/edge X40 (PRC)
- edge 40 NEO
- edge 50
- edge 50 PRO
- edge 50 FUSION
- edge 50 NEO
- edge 50 ULTRA
- edge (2024)
- edge 60 FUSION
- edge 60
- edge 60 FUSION
- edge 60 STYLUS
- edge 60 PRO
- edge 60 NEO
- edge 70
- edge 70 FUSION
- edge 70 pro
- edge 70 pro+
- edge 70 Max (2026)
