= Motorola Edge 50 Neo =

Motorola smartphone released in 2024

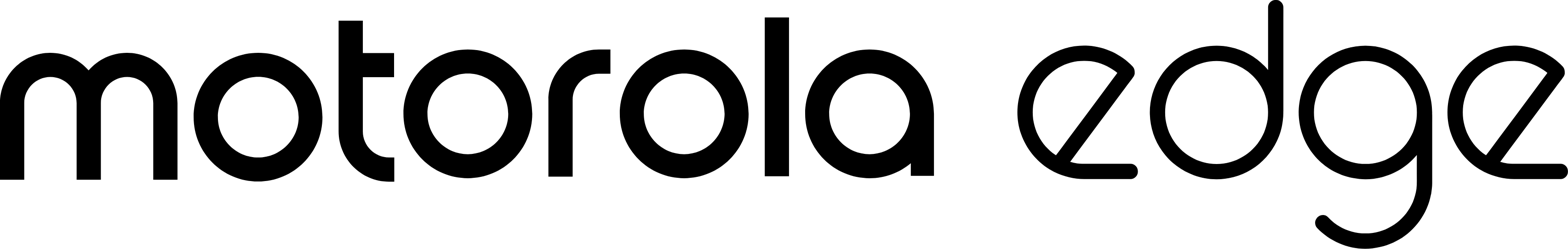

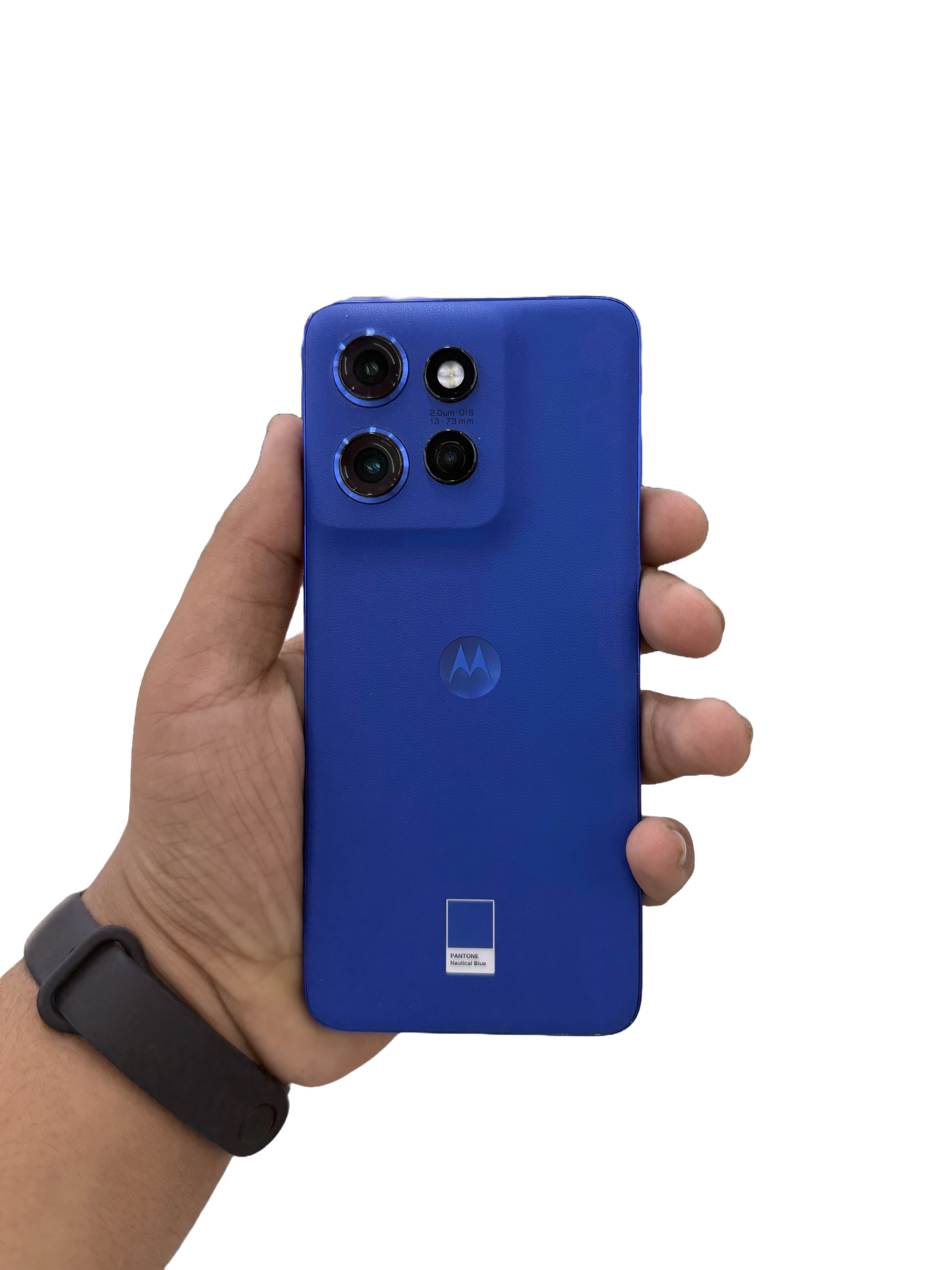
- Brand: Motorola
- Manufacturer: Motorola Mobility
- Type: Smartphone
- Series: Motorola Edge 50 series
- First released: 29 August 2024
- Related: Motorola Edge 50; Motorola Edge 50 Fusion; Motorola Edge 50 Pro; Motorola Edge 50 Ultra
- Compatible networks: 2G, 3G, 4G, 5G (dual SIM: Nano‑SIM + eSIM or dual Nano‑SIM)
- Form factor: Slate
- Colors: Pantone Grisaille, Latte, Nautical Blue, Poinciana (also Mocha Mousse)
- Dimensions: 154.1 mm (6.07 in) × 71.2 mm (2.80 in) × 8.1 mm (0.32 in)
- Weight: 171 g (6.0 oz)
- Operating system: Android 14 with Hello UI Currently Running Android 15 With Hello UI
- System-on-chip: MediaTek Dimensity 7300 (4 nm)
- CPU: Octa‑core (4×2.5 GHz + 4×2.0 GHz)
- Modem: 5G NR
- Memory: 8 GB or 12 GB LPDDR4X
- Storage: 256 GB or 512 GB UFS 2.2 (non‑expandable)
- SIM: eSIM, NanoSIM
- Battery: 4310 mAh
- Charging: 68 W TurboPower wired, 15 W wireless charging support
- Rear camera: Triple: 50 MP (wide, f/1.8, OIS & PDAF), 13 MP (ultrawide, f/2.2), 10 MP (telephoto, f/2.0, ~3× optical zoom)
- Front camera: 32 MP (wide, f/2.4, autofocus)
- Display: P‑OLED LTPO, ~6.4 inches, 120 Hz, FHD+ (~1220×2670 px), HDR10+, Corning Gorilla Glass 3
- Connectivity: Wi‑Fi 802.11 a/b/g/n/ac (tri‑band), Bluetooth 5.3, NFC, USB‑C, GPS (GALILEO, GLONASS, BDS etc.)
- Water resistance: IP68 dust/water resistant; MIL‑STD‑810H certified
- Other: On‑screen fingerprint reader; Moto AI features; up to 5 years of OS and security updates
- Website: https://www.motorola.com/we/en/p/phones/motorola-edge/motorola-edge-50-neo/

The Motorola Edge 50 Neo was announced and released on September 13, 2024.

== Design, display and hardware ==
It measures 159.6 x 72 x 7.8 mm and weighs 170 or 172 grams. Its design features a glass front (Gorilla Glass 3), a plastic frame, and a silicone polymer back with an eco leather finish. The device is rated for IP68 dust and water resistance and supports Dual SIM (Nano‑SIM, eSIM or Nano‑SIM, dual stand‑by).

The Neo uses a 6.4‑inch P-OLED display with support for 1 billion colors, a 120 Hz refresh rate, HDR10+ support, and a peak brightness of 3000 nits. The resolution is 1200 x 2670 pixels.

It is powered by the Mediatek Dimensity 7300 (4 nm) chipset with an octa‑core CPU. Available configurations include 8/12GB RAM with either 256GB or 512GB of storage (UFS 2.2), and it runs Android 14 with five years of software updates.

The rear camera system consists of a 50MP main sensor (f/1.8, wide) with PDAF and OIS and a 13MP ultrawide lens (f/2.2, 120˚) with AF. A 10 Megapixel 3x Telephoto lens with OIS and PDAF is present. Video recording is supported at 4K@30fps and 1080p at various frame rates with gyro‑EIS, while the front camera is a 32MP sensor (f/2.4, wide).

Stereo speakers and a 4310 mAh battery supporting 68W wired charging and 15W Wireless charging are included. The device is offered in Pantone‑validated colours such as Grisaille, Lattè, Nautical Blue, Poinciana and Mocha Mouse

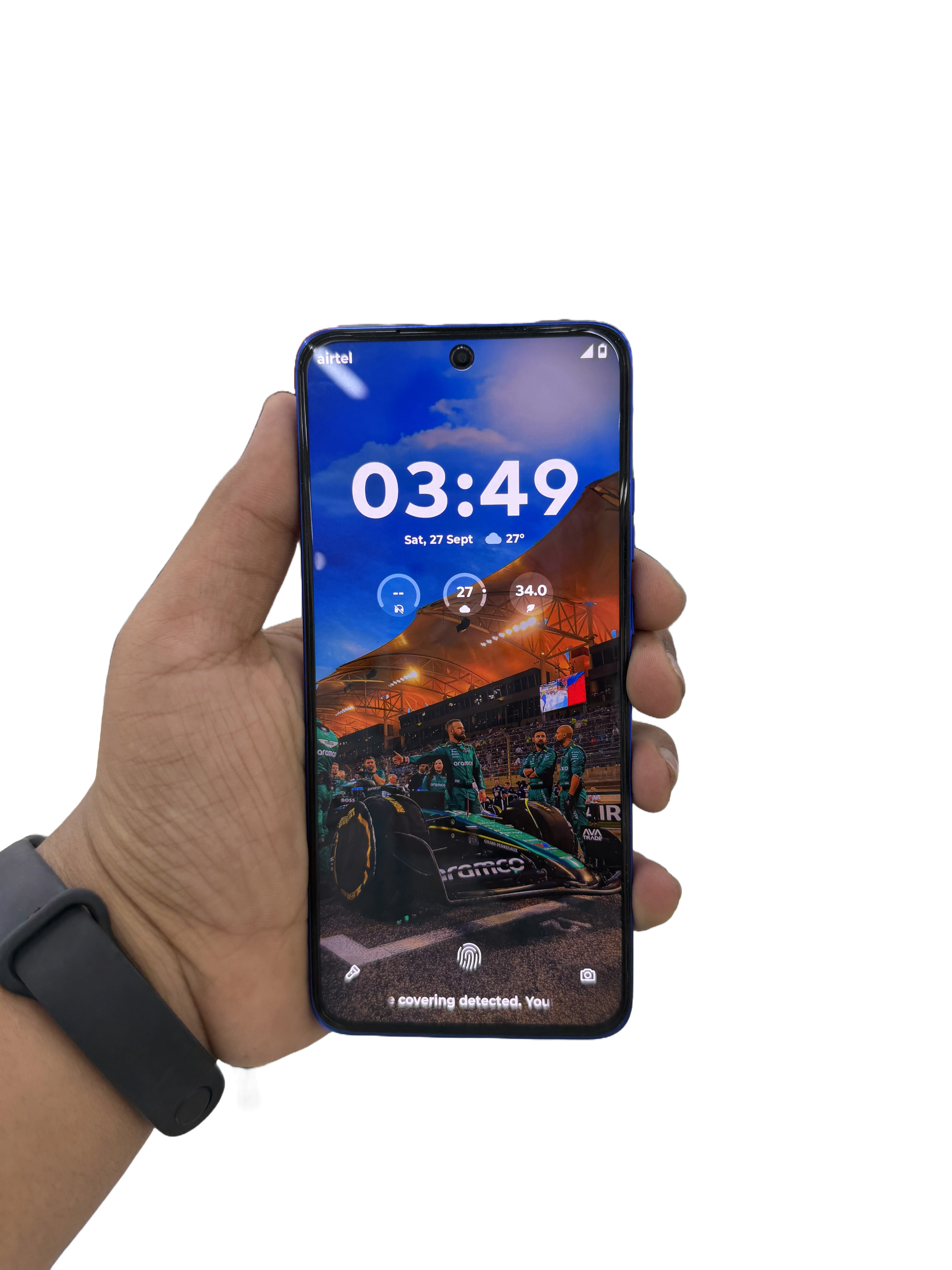
Motorola Edge 50 Neo in Nautical Blue (Front View)

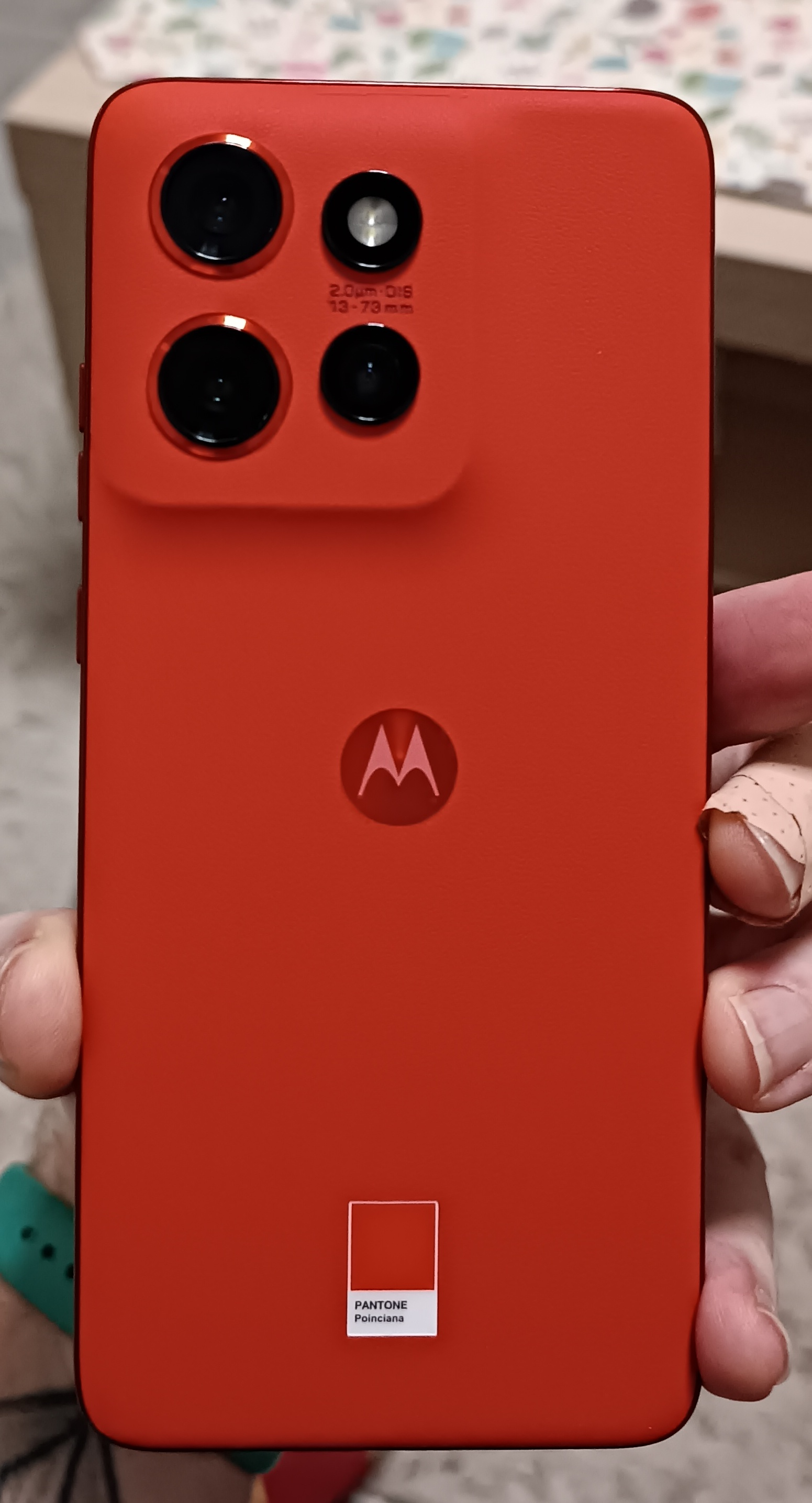
Motorola Edge 50 Neo (Poinciana)

== Availability and pricing ==
The Motorola Edge 50 Neo was introduced in September 2024 with an emphasis on design and color collaboration with Pantone. In Europe, it is priced starting at €399, with availability announced for Europe, Latin America, and Asia.

== Reception ==
Reviewers noted the Neo’s distinctive design and the Pantone‑tuned colour options, along with its slim and lightweight build. Its 120 Hz P‑OLED display and IP68 rating, combined with fast charging for its 4310mAh battery, were identified as noteworthy. However, some criticism was directed at the Mediatek 7300 chipset for intensive tasks, as well as observations regarding inconsistent low‑light performance from the ultrawide camera and the use of UMCP storage.
