= Motorola Edge 50 Fusion =

Android phones developed by Motorola Mobility

Motorola Edge 50 fusion
- Manufacturer: Motorola Mobility
- Type: Phablet
- Series: Edge
- First released: 15 May 2024; 2 years ago
- Related: Motorola Edge 50; Motorola Edge 50 Neo; Motorola Edge 50 Pro; Motorola Edge 50 Ultra
- Compatible networks: 2G EDGE, GPRS/3G HSPA, HSPA+/4G LTE, LTE+, 5G
- Form factor: Slate
- Dimensions: 162 mm × 73.1 mm × 7.8 mm (6.38 in × 2.88 in × 0.31 in)
- Weight: 175 g (6.2 oz)
- Operating system: Original: Android 14
- System-on-chip: Qualcomm List of Qualcomm Snapdragon systems-on-chip#Snapdragon 7s Gen 2
- CPU: Octa-core
- GPU: Adreno 710
- Memory: 12 GB RAM
- Removable storage: microSDXC
- Battery: 5000 mAh
- Display: 6.7 in (170.2 mm), 2340 × 1080 (395 ppi), pOLED capacitive touchscreen, 144 Hz refresh rate
- Sound: stereo speaker system
- Data inputs: Fingerprint sensor (optical), accelerometer, gyro, proximity
- Model: PB300000IN
- Website: Motorola Edge 50 Fusion

The Motorola Edge fusion 50 is Android smartphone developed by Motorola Mobility, a subsidiary of Lenovo. This phone falls in the Motorola Edge series.

== Specifications ==
=== Hardware ===
The Edge 50 fusion uses the Snapdragon 7s Gen 2 chipset processor with the Adreno 710 GPU. It has 12 GB of RAM and a microSD card slot for expandable storage. It has a 6.67-inch pOLED endless edge display with a full HD+ resolution featuring an optical (under-screen) fingerprint scanner. It has a pixel density of 395 ppi and supports a refresh rate of 144 hz with 10-bit colour depth, 100% DCI-P3 wide colour gamut, and a peak brightness of 1,600 nits, having a sustained high brightness mode of 1200 nits. The battery capacity is 5000 mAh, coupled with 68W TurboPower fast charging support. The camera setup consists of a main camera with 50MP Sony LYT-700C sensor with an f/1.8 aperture and 1.0 μm pixel size, while the secondary camera is a 13MP ultra-wide lens with an f/2.2 aperture and a 120-degree field of view. The front camera is a 32MP sensor. It features a stereo speaker system, which supports Dolby Atmos surround sound.

=== Software ===
The Edge 50 fusion launched on a near-stock version of Android 14 with Motorola's Hello UI skin, minimal bloatware, and some pre-installed apps that cannot be uninstalled. The company also provides 3 years of Android updates and 4 years of security updates to this phone.
