= Motorola Edge 60 series =

Android smartphones

The Motorola Edge 60 series are a line-up of Android smartphones developed by Motorola Mobility, a subsidiary of Lenovo. Released in 2025, the series includes the Motorola Edge 60, Motorola Edge 60 Fusion (Moto Edge 60s in China), Motorola Edge 60 Stylus and the Motorola Edge 60 Pro, covering a range of mid-range to upper mid-range segments.

== Motorola Edge 60 ==
=== Design, display, and hardware ===
The Edge 60 features a 6.67-inch P-OLED display with a resolution of 1220 × 2712 pixels, a 120 Hz refresh rate, HDR10+ support, and up to 4,500 nits of peak brightness. The device has a screen-to-body ratio of approximately 91.1%. It is constructed with Gorilla Glass 7i on the front, a plastic frame, and a plastic back. The phone is IP68/IP69 rated for dust and water resistance and complies with MIL-STD-810H certification standards.

The Edge 60 is powered by the MediaTek Dimensity 7300 chipset with a 4 nm process. It comes in configurations of 8 GB or 12 GB RAM and storage options of 256 GB or 512 GB UFS 4.0. The device includes a microSDXC slot for expandable storage with capacity up to 1 TB. It runs on Android 15 and is expected to receive up to three major Android OS updates.

The rear camera setup comprises a triple camera system: a 50 MP main sensor with optical image stabilization (OIS), a 10 MP telephoto lens with 3× optical zoom and OIS, and a 50 MP ultrawide lens with 122° field of view. All cameras support 4K video recording at 30fps.

The global variant houses a 5200 mAh battery, while the Chinese version includes a 5500 mAh battery. Both support 68 W wired fast charging.

=== Availability and pricing ===
The Edge 60 was launched globally in 2025 and is available in select international markets. The device comes in various configurations with 8 GB or 12 GB RAM and 256 GB or 512 GB storage options. It is available in multiple color variants and sold through major retailers and online platforms.

=== Reception ===
The Edge 60 was praised for offering a clean Android experience and decent build quality at an entry-level price point in the Edge series. The inclusion of OIS in the main camera and the P-OLED display were noted as standout features for its price range. Reviewers appreciated the device's performance for everyday tasks and its battery life.

Criticism of the Edge 60 focused on its plastic build quality compared to premium materials used in higher-end Edge models. The limited IP54 rating instead of IP68, slower charging speeds compared to competitors, and the absence of a telephoto lens were also noted as drawbacks. Some users also pointed out that the 16MP front camera produces softer images compared to higher-resolution alternatives in the same price range.

== Motorola Edge 60 Fusion / Moto Edge 60s ==
=== Design, display, and hardware ===
The Edge 60 Fusion features a 6.67-inch P-OLED display with a resolution of 1220 × 2712 pixels, a 120 Hz refresh rate, and HDR10+ support. The device has a screen-to-body ratio of approximately 96.32%. It is constructed with Gorilla Glass 7i on the front and offers a vegan leather or matte acrylic back, depending on the variant. The phone is IP68 and IP69 rated for dust and water resistance and complies with MIL-STD-810H certification standards.

The Edge 60 Fusion is powered by the MediaTek Dimensity 7400 chipset in the Indian variant and the Dimensity 7300 globally. It offers configurations of 8 GB or 12 GB RAM and storage options of 256 GB or 512 GB UFS 2.2. The device includes a microSDXC slot for expandable storage. It runs on Android 15 and is expected to receive up to two major Android OS updates.

The rear camera setup comprises a 50MP main sensor with optical image stabilization (OIS) and a 13MP ultrawide lens. The front-facing camera is a 32MP shooter capable of 4K video recording.

The Indian variant houses a 5500mAh battery, while the global version includes a 5200mAh battery. Both support 68W wired fast charging.

=== Availability and pricing ===
The Edge 60 Fusion was launched in India on April 2, 2025, and became available for purchase on April 9, 2025. The 8 GB + 256 GB variant is priced at ₹22,999, and the 12 GB + 256 GB variant at ₹24,999. It is also available in select international markets.

=== Reception ===
The Edge 60 Fusion was noted for its display quality, design, and inclusion of features such as HDR10+ and high brightness levels. The use of MediaTek's Dimensity chipsets was seen as an efficient choice for the mid-range category. Reviewers highlighted the device's build quality and high screen-to-body ratio.

Criticism of the Fusion focused on the use of UFS 2.2 storage, which is slower than UFS 3.1 and UFS 4.0 used in some competing devices. Additionally, the absence of a telephoto lens and limited camera versatility were noted.

== Motorola Edge 60 Stylus/ Motorola Moto G Stylus ==
=== Design, display, and hardware ===
The Edge 60 Stylus features a 6.67-inch pOLED display with a resolution of 1220 × 2712 pixels, a 120 Hz refresh rate, and HDR10+ support. The device has a flat screen design and is protected by Corning Gorilla Glass 3. It measures 8.3 mm in thickness and weighs approximately 191 grams. The phone is IP68 rated for dust and water resistance and complies with MIL-STD-810H standards.

Powered by the Qualcomm Snapdragon 7s Gen 2 chipset, the device comes with 8 GB of LPDDR4x RAM and 256 GB of UFS 2.2 storage. It includes a dedicated microSDXC card slot for storage expansion. The phone runs on Android 15 and is expected to receive two major OS updates and three years of security patches.

The rear camera system consists of a 50MP primary sensor (Sony LYTIA 700C) with OIS and a 13MP ultrawide lens. The front-facing camera is a 32MP shooter. Both rear and front cameras support 4K video recording. The Edge 60 Stylus includes a built-in stylus housed within the device. The stylus supports features such as Moto Note, handwriting-to-text conversion, sketch-to-image, and a handwriting calculator. It also integrates with AI-based applications like Glance AI.

The device is equipped with a 5000mAh battery, supporting 68W wired charging and 15W wireless charging.

=== Availability and pricing ===
The Edge 60 Stylus was launched on April 15, 2025, and became available for purchase in India starting April 23, 2025, at 12 PM IST. It is priced at ₹22,999 and is available in two color options: Pantone Surf the Web and Pantone Gibraltar Sea. The device is sold through Flipkart, Motorola.in, and leading retail stores across India.

=== Reception ===
The Edge 60 Stylus was well received for offering integrated stylus functionality at an affordable price. The stylus experience was appreciated for note-taking and light sketching, with the inclusion of features like Moto Note and handwriting-to-text tools. Reviewers also noted the clean software experience, pOLED display, and wireless charging support as key positives.

Criticisms of the Stylus variant included its use of the Snapdragon 7s Gen 2 chipset, which was seen as adequate but not competitive with newer offerings in the same price bracket. The device's reliance on LPDDR4x RAM and UFS 2.2 storage was also mentioned as a limitation in terms of speed and efficiency. Additionally, the lack of stylus pressure sensitivity and palm rejection during writing was highlighted as a drawback for creative users.

== Motorola Edge 60 Pro ==
=== Design, Display, and hardware ===
The Edge 60 Pro features a 6.7-inch curved pOLED display with a resolution of 1220 × 2712 pixels (1.5K), 120 Hz refresh rate, HDR10+ support, and up to 4,500 nits of peak brightness. The screen is protected by Gorilla Glass 7i. The device is IP68/IP69 rated and MIL-STD-810H compliant. The phone is powered by the MediaTek Dimensity 8350 Extreme SoC. It is available in 8 GB or 12 GB LPDDR5x RAM variants with 256 GB of UFS 4.0 storage. It runs Android 15 with Motorola's Hello UI and is eligible for three OS upgrades and four years of security updates.

It features a triple rear camera setup: a 50MP main sensor with OIS (Sony LYTIA 700C), a 50MP ultrawide camera, and a 10MP telephoto lens with 3x optical zoom. The front camera is a 50MP shooter, and both rear and front cameras support 4K video capture.

The Edge 60 Pro is equipped with a 6000mAh battery. It supports 90W wired charging, 15W wireless charging, and 5W reverse wireless charging.

=== Availability and Pricing ===
The phone launched in India on April 30, 2025, with availability starting May 7, 2025. Pricing is ₹29,999 for the 8 GB + 256 GB model and ₹33,999 for the 12 GB + 256 GB variant. It is available in Pantone Dazzling Blue, Sparkling Grape, and Shadow.

=== Reception ===
The Motorola Edge 60 Pro was well received for offering premium features such as a 1.5K curved OLED display, 6000mAh battery with 90W charging, and a versatile triple-camera setup with telephoto support. The use of UFS 4.0 storage and IP69 certification was also noted as beneficial in its segment.

Criticisms included the absence of a microSD slot for storage expansion and the lack of a higher refresh rate (above 120 Hz) were mentioned by some reviewers.

== See also ==
- Motorola Edge series
- Motorola Mobility
- List of Motorola smartphones
- Android version history
