= Motorola Edge (2020) =

Android phones developed by Motorola Mobility

Motorola Edge (2020) Motorola Edge+ (2020)
- Manufacturer: Motorola Mobility
- Type: Phablet
- Series: Edge
- First released: Edge (2020): 29 May 2020; 6 years ago Edge+ (2020): 14 May 2020; 6 years ago
- Predecessor: Moto Z series Moto X series
- Successor: Motorola Edge 20; Motorola Edge (2021)
- Compatible networks: 2G EDGE, GPRS/3G HSPA, HSPA+/4G LTE, LTE+, 5G
- Form factor: Slate
- Dimensions: Edge (2020): 161.6 mm × 71.1 mm × 9.3 mm (6.36 in × 2.80 in × 0.37 in); Edge+ (2020): 161.1 mm × 71.4 mm × 9.6 mm (6.34 in × 2.81 in × 0.38 in)
- Weight: Edge (2020): 188 g (6.6 oz); Edge+ (2020): 203 g (7.2 oz)
- Operating system: Original: Android 10; Current (Edge (2020)): Android 11; Current (Edge+ (2020)): Android 12
- System-on-chip: Edge (2020): Qualcomm Snapdragon 765G; Edge+ (2020): Qualcomm Snapdragon 865
- CPU: Octa-core, Edge (2020): 2.4 GHz (1x 2.4 GHz Kryo 475 Prime + 1x 2.2 GHz Kryo 475 Gold + 6x 1.8 GHz Kryo 475 Silver); Edge+ (2020): 2.84 GHz (1x 2.84 GHz + 3x 2.42 GHz + 4x 1.8 GHz Kryo 585)
- GPU: Edge (2020): Adreno 620; Edge+ (2020): Adreno 650
- Memory: Edge (2020): 4/6 GB RAM; Edge+ (2020): 12 GB RAM
- Storage: Edge(2020): 128/256 GB UFS 2.1; Edge+ (2020): 256 GB UFS 3.0
- Removable storage: Edge (2020): microSDXC; Edge+ (2020): Non-expandable
- Battery: Edge (2020): 4500 mAh; Edge+(2020): 5000 mAh
- Rear camera: Edge (2020): 64 MP, f/1.8, 1/1.72", 0.8 μm (wide) + 16 MP, f/2.2, 13mm, 1.0 μm (ultrawide) + 8 MP, f/2.4, 52mm, 1.12 μm (telephoto) + ToF 3D (depth), PDAF, 2x optical zoom, 4K@30fps, 1080p@30/60fps, LED flash, panorama, HDR; Edge+ (2020): 108 MP, f/1.8, 1/1.33", 0.8 μm (wide) + 16 MP, f/2.2, 13mm, 1.0 μm (ultrawide) + 8 MP, f/2.4, 81mm, 1.12 μm (telephoto) + ToF 3D (depth), PDAF, gyro-EIS, OIS, 3x optical zoom, 6K@30fps, 4K@30fps, 1080p@30/60/120fps, dual-LED flash, panorama, HDR
- Front camera: 25 MP, f/2.0, 0.9 μm, 1080p@30fps, HDR
- Display: 6.7 in (170.2 mm), 2340 × 1080 (385 ppi), OLED capacitive touchscreen, 16M colors (Edge (2020))/1B colors (Edge+ (2020)); 90 Hz refresh rate, HDR10 (Edge (2020))/HDR10+ (Edge+ (2020))
- Sound: Stereo loudspeakers, 3.5mm audio jack
- Connectivity: Wi-Fi 802.11a/b/g/n/ac (2.4 & 5 GHz)/802.11a/b/g/n/ac/6 (2.4 & 5 GHz), dual-band, WiFi direct, hotspot, Bluetooth v5.1, A2DP, Low-energy
- Data inputs: Fingerprint sensor (optical), accelerometer, gyro, proximity
- Model: XT2063 (Edge (2020)); XT2061 (Edge+ (2020))
- Development status: Discontinued
- Website: Motorola Edge; Motorola Edge+

The Motorola Edge (2020) and Edge+ (2020) are Android smartphones developed by Motorola Mobility, a subsidiary of Lenovo.

== History ==
Renders of the phone were leaked in March, a month prior to the phone's anticipated launch on the mobile review blog Price Baba.

On 13 April, Motorola put out a tweet announcing a virtual launch for its next flagship phone on 22 April. The phone was originally meant to be launched at the Mobile World Congress in February but the event was cancelled due to the COVID-19 pandemic.

On 21 April, a day prior to the scheduled event, a blog post detailing the phone's features appeared on Motorola's blog before it was pulled down.

Almost after a month of the global launch, on 19 May 2020, the company also launched the Motorola Edge+ (2020) in India.

== Specifications ==
=== Hardware ===
The Edge (2020) uses the Snapdragon 765G processor with the Adreno 620 GPU, while the Edge+ (2020) uses the Snapdragon 865 processor with the Adreno 650 GPU. The Edge (2020) has 128 GB of UFS 2.1 storage (256 GB for the U.S. version) paired with 4 or 6 GB (6 GB only for U.S.) of RAM, while the Edge+ (2020) has 256 GB of UFS 3.0 storage paired with 12 GB of RAM. The Edge (2020) also has a microSDXC card slot for expandable storage. The display is an OLED panel with HDR10/HDR10+ support, featuring an optical (under-screen) fingerprint scanner. A 6.7 in (170 mm) 1080p screen is used, with a 19.5:9 aspect ratio and a 90 Hz refresh rate. The battery capacity is 4500 mAh on the Edge (2020) and 5000 mAh on the Edge+ (2020); wired fast charging is supported over USB-C at 18W, and wireless charging is supported at 15W on the Edge+ (2020). Stereo speakers and a 3.5mm audio jack are also included. The Edge (2020)'s camera setup consists of a 64 MP wide sensor, a 16 MP ultrawide sensor, an 8 MP telephoto sensor, and a time-of-flight sensor. The Edge+ (2020) uses a 108 MP wide sensor but is otherwise identical. The front camera on both uses a 25 MP sensor.

=== Software ===
The Edge (2020) and Edge+ (2020) launched on a near-stock version of Android 10, with custom features in the pre-installed Moto app. The Edge (2020) can be updated to Android 11, the Edge+ (2020) can be updated to Android 12.

== Reception ==
Chaim Gartenberg of The Verge gave the Edge+ (2020) a score of 7.5/10, praising the camera performance and battery life while criticizing the Verizon exclusivity and lack of waterproofing. He wrote that "In many ways, the new Motorola Edge Plus is a phone that's unlike anything Motorola has made before. But at the same time, it's also a phone that's very much like every other Android flagship on the market".

The Edge+ (2020) received an overall score of 113 from DXOMARK, with a photo score of 119 and video score of 101, tying it with the Samsung Galaxy S10+.
