= Motorola Edge 20 =

Android phones developed by Motorola Mobility

Motorola Edge 20 series
- Manufacturer: Motorola Mobility
- Type: Phablet
- Series: Edge
- First released: 16 August 2021; 5 years ago
- Predecessor: Motorola Edge/Edge+
- Successor: Motorola Edge 30
- Related: Motorola Edge (2021)
- Compatible networks: 2G, 3G, 4G, 4G LTE, 5G
- Form factor: Slate
- Dimensions: Edge 20 Lite & Edge 20 Fusion: 166 mm × 76 mm × 8.3 mm (6.54 in × 2.99 in × 0.33 in); Edge 20: 163 mm × 76 mm × 7 mm (6.42 in × 2.99 in × 0.28 in); Edge 20 Pro: 163 mm × 76 mm × 8 mm (6.42 in × 2.99 in × 0.31 in)
- Weight: Edge 20 Lite & Edge 20 Fusion: 185 g (6.5 oz); Edge 20: 163 g (5.7 oz); Edge 20 Pro: 185–190 g (6.5–6.7 oz)
- Operating system: Android 11
- System-on-chip: Edge 20 Lite: MediaTek Dimensity 720; Edge 20 Fusion: MediaTek Dimensity 800U; Edge 20: Qualcomm Snapdragon 778G; Edge 20 Pro: Qualcomm Snapdragon 870
- CPU: Octa-core, Edge 20 Lite: (2x 2.0 GHz Cortex-A76 + 6x 2.0 GHz Cortex-A55); Edge 20 Fusion: (2x 2.4 GHz Cortex-A76 + 6x 2.0 GHz Cortex-A55); Edge 20: (1x 2.4 GHz Kryo 670 + 3x 2.2 GHz Kryo 670 + 4x 1.9 GHz Kryo 670); Edge 20 Pro: (1x 3.2 GHz Kryo 585 + 3x 2.42 GHz Kryo 585 + 4x 1.8 GHz Kryo 585)
- GPU: Edge 20 Lite & Edge 20 Fusion: Mali-G57 MC3; Edge 20: Adreno 642L; Edge 20 Pro: Adreno 650
- Memory: Edge 20 Lite & Edge 20 Fusion: 6 or 8 GB RAM; Edge 20: 8 GB RAM; Edge 20 Pro: 12 GB RAM
- Storage: Edge 20 Lite & Edge 20 Fusion: 128 GB UFS; Edge 20: 128 or 256 GB UFS; Edge 20 Pro: 256 GB UFS
- Removable storage: Edge 20 Lite & Edge 20 Fusion: microSDXC; Edge 20 & Edge 20 Pro: None
- Battery: Edge 20 Lite & Edge 20 Fusion: 5000 mAh; Edge 20: 4000 mAh; Edge 20 Pro: 4500 mAh
- Charging: 30 W fast charging
- Rear camera: Edge 20 Lite & Edge 20 Fusion: 108 MP, f/1.9, 26mm, 1/1.52", 0.7 μm, (wide) + 8 MP, f/2.2, 13mm, 1.12 μm (ultrawide) + 2 MP, f/2.4 (depth); Edge 20: 108 MP, f/1.9, 26mm, 1/1.52", 0.7 μm, (wide) + 16 MP, f/2.2, 13mm, 1.0 μm (ultrawide) + 8 MP, f/2.4, 79mm, 1.0 μm (telephoto), 3x optical zoom; Edge 20 Pro: 108 MP, f/1.9, 26mm, 1/1.52", 0.7 μm (wide) + 16 MP, f/2.2, 13mm, 1.0 μm (ultrawide) + 8 MP, f/3.4, 126mm, 1.0 μm (telephoto), 5x optical zoom; PDAF, OIS (telephoto), 4K@30fps, 1080p@30/60/120fps, 720p@960fps, gyro-EIS, dual-LED flash, HDR, panorama Edge 20 Pro: 8K@24fps, 4K@60fps
- Front camera: 32 MP, f/2.3, 0.7 μm, 1080p@30fps, HDR
- Display: 6.7 in (170 mm), 1080p 2400 × 1080 (385 ppi), OLED capacitive touchscreen, 20:9 aspect ratio, 1B colors, HDR10+: Edge 20 Lite & Edge 20 Fusion: 90 Hz refresh rate; Edge 20 & Edge 20 Pro: 144 Hz refresh rate
- Sound: Loudspeaker, 3.5 mm audio jack
- Connectivity: Wi-Fi 802.11a/b/g/n/ac/6e (2.4 & 5 GHz), dual-band, WiFi direct, hotspot, Bluetooth v5.2, A2DP, Low-energy
- Data inputs: Fingerprint scanner, accelerometer, gyro, proximity, compass, barometer
- Development status: released
- Website: Motorola Edge 20

Motorola Edge 20 is a 2021 series of Android smartphones developed by Motorola Mobility, a subsidiary of Lenovo. The series consists of 4 models, the base Edge 20, and the Edge 20 Lite, Fusion, and Pro. All models feature an OLED display with 10-bit color depth support.
