= Motorola Edge 50 series =

Android smartphones by Motorola

The Motorola Edge 50 series are a line of Android smartphones developed by Motorola Mobility, a subsidiary of Lenovo. Launched in 2024, the series comprises several models, including the Motorola Edge 50 (known in North America as the Motorola Edge (2024)), the Motorola Edge 50 Fusion (announced for global markets), the Motorola Edge 50 Pro, and the Motorola Edge 50 Ultra. The series was later expanded with the Motorola Edge 50 Neo in September 2024.

== Motorola Edge 50 ==
The Motorola Edge 50 (referred to in North America as the Motorola Edge (2024)) is the base model of the Edge 50 series for certain markets. It was introduced in May 2024 with a design that emphasizes key mid-range features.

=== Design, display and hardware ===
The Motorola Edge 50 was announced on May 8, 2024. It measures 159.6 x 71.9 x 8.1 mm and weighs 174 grams. The device has a glass front (Gorilla Glass 3), a plastic frame, and a silicone polymer back with an eco leather finish. It is rated IP68 for dust and water resistance.

The 6.6‑inch curved P-OLED display supports 1 billion colors, a 144 Hz refresh rate, HDR10+ and a peak brightness of 1300 nits. The resolution is 1080 x 2400 pixels (approximately 405 ppi), and the screen is protected by Corning Gorilla Glass 3.

Powered by the Qualcomm SM7550-AB Snapdragon 7s Gen 2 (4 nm) chipset with an octa‑core CPU and Adreno 710 GPU, the device comes with 8GB of RAM and 256GB of UFS 2.2 internal storage (no expandable slot). It runs Android 14.

The rear camera system includes a 50MP main sensor (Sony LYT-700C, f/1.8) with PDAF and OIS, and a 13MP ultrawide lens (f/2.2, 120˚) with AF for macro photography. The front camera is a 32MP sensor (f/2.4). Video recording is supported at up to 4K@30fps on the rear camera and 1080p@30fps on the front. Stereo speakers and a 5000mAh non-removable battery are included, with support for 68W wired charging (advertised as 50% in 15 min) and 15W wireless charging.

=== Availability and pricing ===
The Motorola Edge 50 was released in the US market in May 2024 at a retail price of $549.99. It was made available through Motorola's website and other retailers and is offered in Midnight Blue with a vegan leather finish.

=== Reception ===
Reviews noted the design—including the vegan leather back and 144 Hz display—as well as the fast charging and IP68 rating. Some reviewers mentioned that while the Snapdragon 7s Gen 2 offers satisfactory everyday performance, it may not be optimal for heavy gaming compared to other chips. Camera performance was considered adequate for its class, and the use of Gorilla Glass 3 was seen as a conservative choice compared to some newer glass standards.

== Motorola Edge 50 Fusion ==
The Motorola Edge 50 Fusion is targeted at the global market and was announced in April 2024. It shares design characteristics with other models in the series while accommodating regional hardware variations.

=== Design, display and hardware ===
Announced on April 16, 2024, the Edge 50 Fusion measures 161.9 x 73.1 x 7.9 mm and weighs 175 grams. Its construction comprises a glass front (typically Gorilla Glass 5 in global versions), a plastic frame, and either a silicone polymer back (eco leather) or a PMMA back. The device is rated IP68 for dust and water resistance.

The Fusion features a 6.7‑inch P-OLED display supporting 1 billion colors, a 144 Hz refresh rate, and a peak brightness of 1600 nits. The screen resolution is 1080 x 2400 pixels (approximately 393 ppi) and is protected by Corning Gorilla Glass 5.

Chipset configurations vary by region: international models typically use the Snapdragon 7s Gen 2 (4 nm), while some models for Latin America, India, and Oceania are built on the Qualcomm SM6450 Snapdragon 6 Gen 1 (4 nm). The device is available with configurations of up to 512GB storage and 12GB RAM (UFS 2.2) and runs Android 14.

The rear camera setup includes a 50MP main sensor (Sony LYTIA 700C) with OIS and a 13MP ultrawide lens with AF. The front camera is a 32MP sensor. Both cameras support 4K video recording (rear at 30fps, front at 30fps). Stereo speakers and a 5000mAh battery with support for 68W wired charging are featured; wireless charging is not standard across all variants.

=== Availability and pricing ===
The device was launched in India on May 16, 2024, with sales commencing on May 22, 2024. The starting price in India was ₹22,999 for the 8GB RAM + 128GB storage variant. It is available in colors such as Forest Blue, Hot Pink, and Marshmallow Blue, and its approximate global price is around €350.

=== Reception ===
Critics characterized the Edge 50 Fusion as a mid-range smartphone with a well‑balanced display and design. Its 144 Hz P‑OLED display, Pantone‑curated color options, and IP68 rating were noted as positive features. However, some reviews mentioned that the performance of the secondary ultrawide camera and the UFS 2.2 storage speed were less competitive, and that the chipset was adequate for everyday tasks but not optimized for demanding applications.

== Motorola Edge 50 Neo ==
=== Design, display and hardware ===
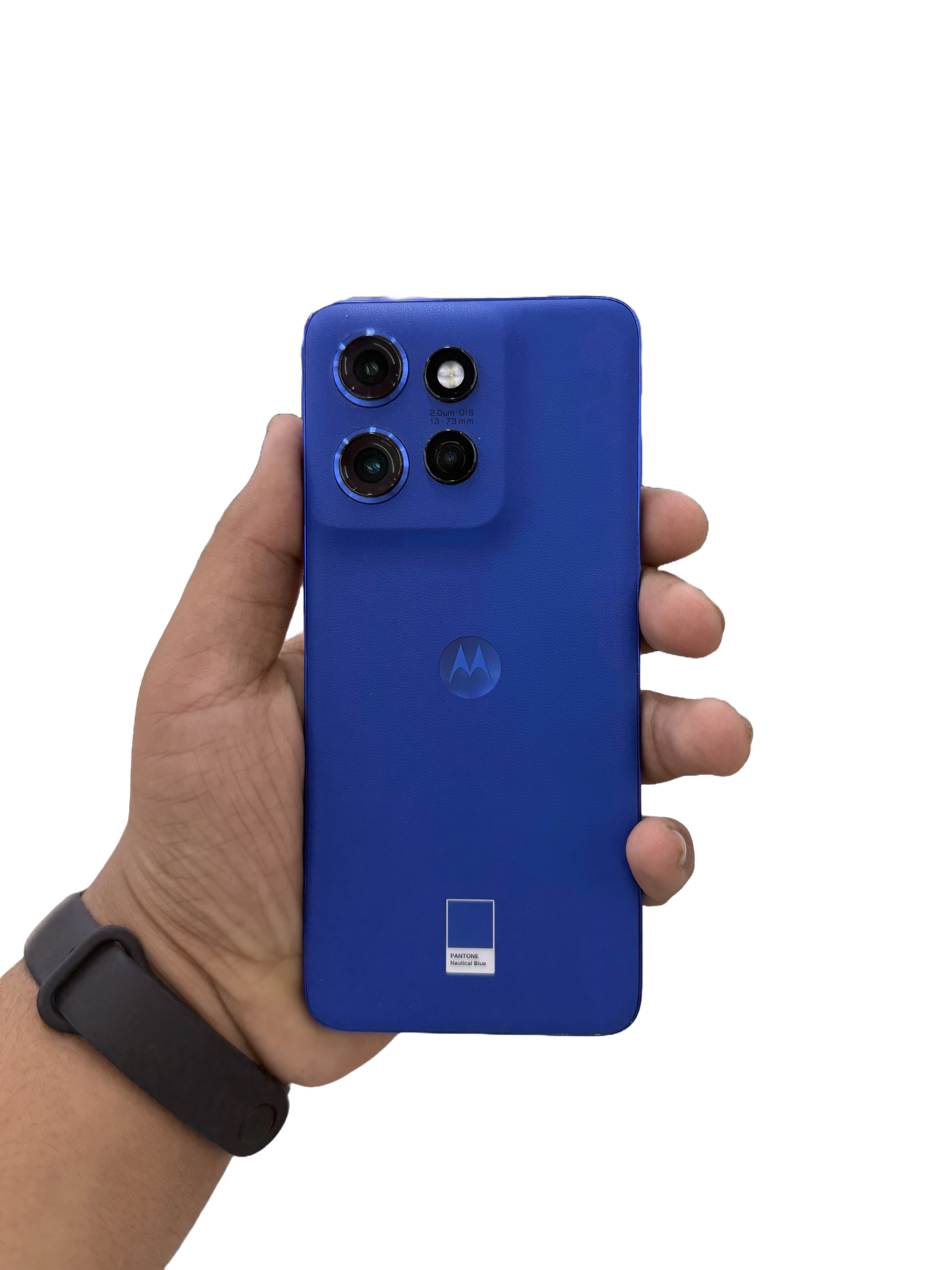
Motorola Edge 50 Neo in Nautical Blue (India)

The Motorola Edge 50 Neo was announced and released on September 13, 2024. It measures 159.6 x 72 x 7.8 mm and weighs 170 or 172 grams. Its design features a glass front (Gorilla Glass 5), a plastic frame, and a silicone polymer back with an eco leather finish. The device is rated for IP68 dust and water resistance and supports Dual SIM (Nano‑SIM, eSIM or Nano‑SIM, dual stand‑by).

The Neo uses a 6.55‑inch P-OLED display with support for 1 billion colors, a 144 Hz refresh rate, HDR10+ support, and a peak brightness of 1300 nits. The resolution is 1080 x 2400 pixels (approximately 402 ppi).

It is powered by the Mediatec Dimensity 7300 (4 nm) chipset with an octa‑core CPU. Available configurations include 8/12GB RAM with either 256GB or 512GB of storage (UFS 2.2), and it runs Android 14 with five years of software updates.

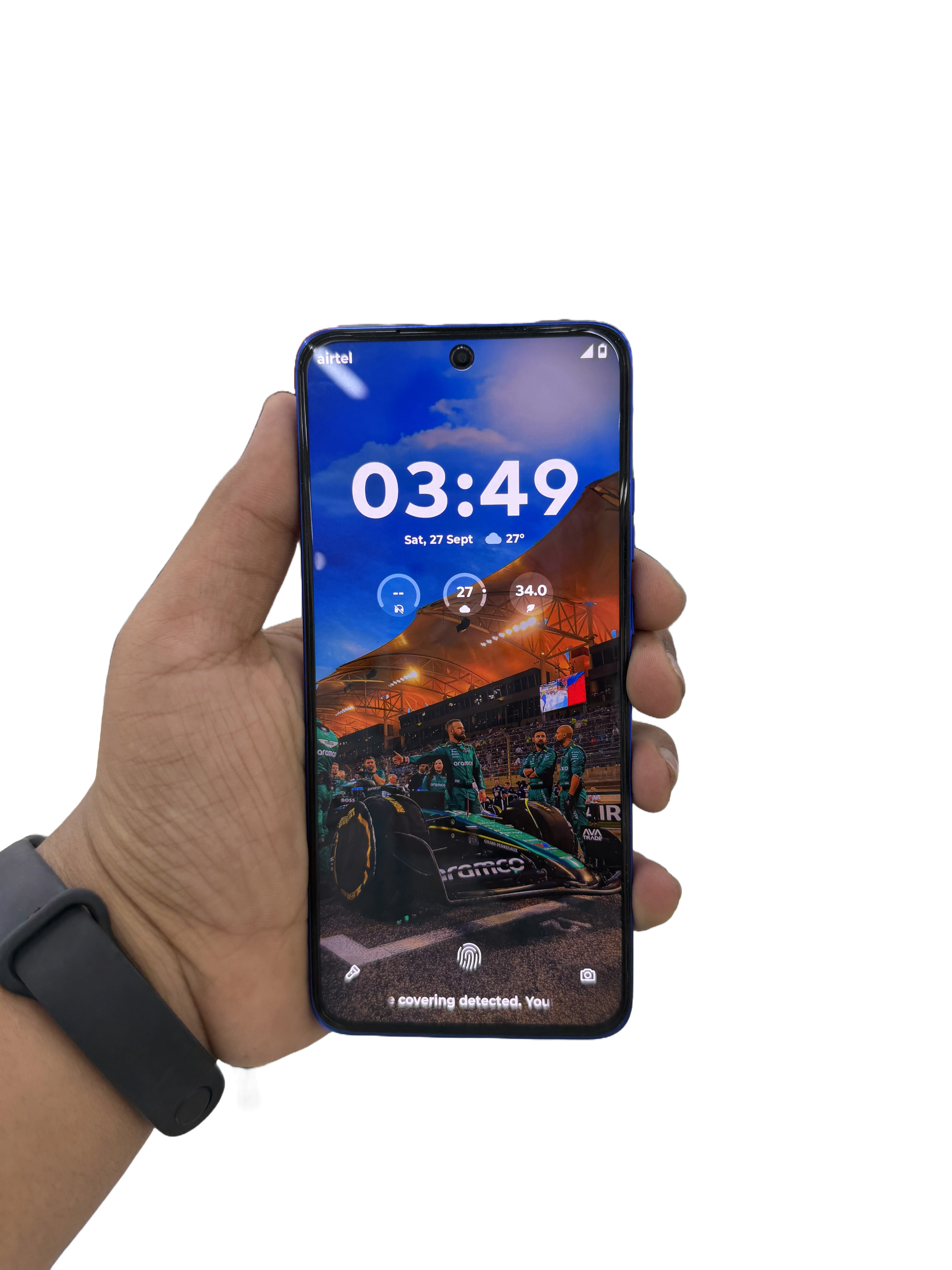
Motorola Edge 50 Neo Front View- Nautical Blue (India)

The rear camera system consists of a 50MP main sensor (f/1.8, wide) with PDAF and OIS and a 13MP ultrawide lens (f/2.2, 120˚) with AF. A 10 Megapixel 3x Telephoto lens with OIS and PDAF is present. Video recording is supported at 4K@30fps and 1080p at various frame rates with gyro‑EIS, while the front camera is a 32MP sensor (f/2.4, wide). Stereo speakers and a 4300 battery supporting 68W wired charging and 15W Wireless charging are included. The device is offered in Pantone‑validated colours such as Grisaille, Latte, Nautical Blue, Poinciana and Mocha Mouse

=== Availability and pricing ===
The Motorola Edge 50 Neo was introduced in September 2024 with an emphasis on design and color collaboration with Pantone. In Europe, it is priced starting at €399, with availability announced for Europe, Latin America, and Asia.

=== Reception ===
Reviewers noted the Neo’s distinctive design and the Pantone‑tuned colour options, along with its slim and lightweight build. Its 144 Hz P‑OLED display and IP68 rating, combined with fast charging for its 4310mAh battery, were identified as noteworthy. However, some criticism was directed at the Mediatek 7300 chipset for intensive tasks, as well as observations regarding inconsistent low‑light performance from the ultrawide camera and the use of UFS 2.2 storage.

== Motorola Edge 50 Pro ==
The Motorola Edge 50 Pro (also known as Motorola X50 Ultra in China) was announced on April 3, 2024. It measures 161.2 x 72.4 x 8.2 mm and weighs 186 grams. The device is built with a glass front, an aluminum frame, and a silicone polymer (eco leather) or acetate back, and is rated IP68. The phone was succeeded by Motorola Edge 60 Pro.

=== Design, display and hardware ===
Featuring a 6.7‑inch P-OLED panel with support for 1 billion colours, a 144 Hz refresh rate, HDR10+ support, and a peak brightness of 2000 nits, the display has a resolution of 1220 x 2712 pixels (approximately 446 ppi).

The Edge 50 Pro is powered by the Snapdragon 7 Gen 3 (4 nm) chipset. It is available in configurations with up to 512GB storage and 12GB RAM (UFS 2.2) and runs Android 14.

The rear camera setup comprises a 50MP main sensor with OIS, a 10MP telephoto lens with 3x optical zoom and OIS, and a 13MP ultrawide lens with AF. The front camera is a 50MP sensor with AF, and both support 4K video recording. Stereo speakers are provided, along with a 4500mAh battery that supports 125W wired, 50W wireless, and 10W reverse wireless charging.

=== Availability and pricing ===
Launched in India on April 3, 2024, the Motorola Edge 50 Pro was priced from ₹31,999 for the 8GB RAM + 256GB storage variant. It became available through Flipkart, Motorola.in, and retail stores from April 9, 2024, and is offered in colours including Black Beauty, Luxe Lavender, and Moonlight Pearl. Globally, its approximate price is €700.

=== Reception ===
The Edge 50 Pro has been noted for incorporating high‑end features such as a 144Hz P‑OLED display with Pantone validation and rapid charging capabilities. However, some reviewers have expressed reservations regarding the Snapdragon 7 Gen 3 chipset when compared to flagship processors and noted the use of UFS 2.2 storage. Variability in the performance of the ultrawide camera module was also observed.

== Motorola Edge 50 Ultra ==
=== Design, display and hardware ===
The Motorola Edge 50 Ultra was announced on April 16, 2024. It measures 161.1 x 72.4 x 8.6 mm and weighs 197 grams. The build includes a glass front (Gorilla Glass Victus), an aluminum frame, and options for either a silicone polymer back (eco leather) or a real wood back, with an IP68 rating for dust and water resistance.

The device features a 6.7‑inch P-OLED display that supports 1 billion colours, a 144 Hz refresh rate, HDR10+ support, and a peak brightness of 2500 nits. Its resolution is 1220 x 2712 pixels (approximately 446 ppi) and it is protected by Corning Gorilla Glass Victus.

Powered by the Snapdragon 8s Gen 3 (4 nm) chipset, the Edge 50 Ultra is available in configurations up to 1TB storage and 16GB RAM, utilizing UFS 4.0 storage. It runs Android 14 and does not include a card slot.

The rear camera system consists of a triple configuration: a 50MP main sensor with OIS, a 64MP periscope telephoto lens with 3x optical zoom and OIS, and a 50MP ultrawide lens with AF. The front camera is a 50MP sensor with AF, and both support 4K video recording, with the rear also offering 10‑bit HDR10+. Additional features include stereo speakers, Ultra-wideband (UWB) support, and a 4500mAh battery that supports 125W wired, 50W wireless, and 10W reverse wireless charging.

=== Availability and pricing ===
The Ultra was announced globally on April 16, 2024, as the flagship model of the Edge 50 series. It launched in select European markets with a starting price of €999 and was planned for release in Asia and Latin America. Colour options include Forest Grey, Nordic Wood, and Peach Fuzz (the Pantone Color of the Year 2024).

=== Reception ===
Reviews of the Edge 50 Ultra have noted its advancement within the Edge series. Its design, including the option of a real wood back, and robust specifications such as the 144Hz P‑OLED display and the Snapdragon 8s Gen 3 chipset have been highlighted. Some criticism was directed at battery performance under heavy use and comparisons were drawn regarding software update policies relative to other flagship devices. The pricing has also been mentioned in the context of a competitive premium segment.

== See also ==
- Motorola Edge series
- Motorola Mobility
- List of Motorola smartphones
- Android version history
