= Motorola Edge 60 Pro =

2025 Motorola Edge-series smartphone

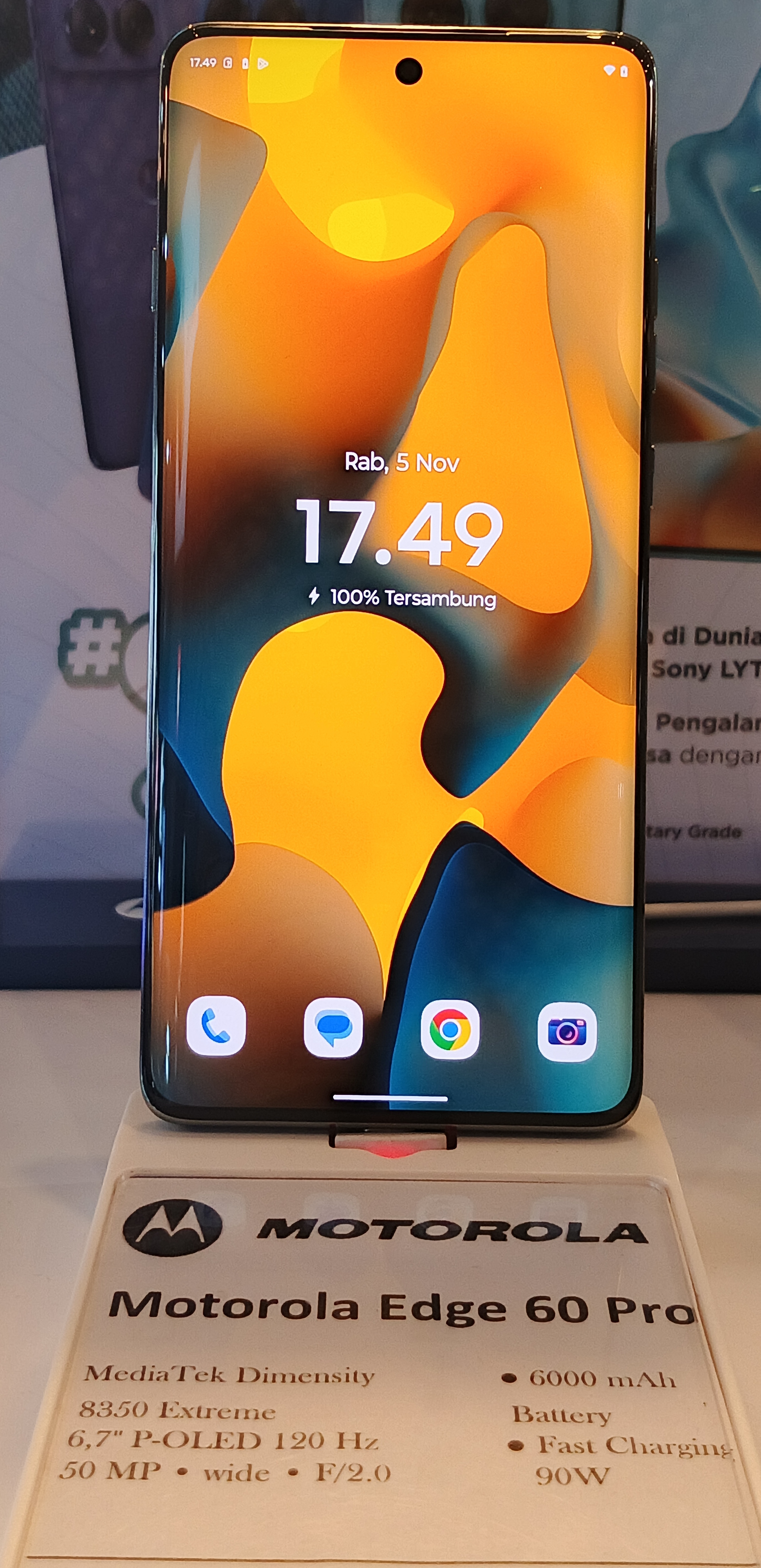
- Motorola Edge 60 Pro
- Developer: Motorola Mobility
- Manufacturer: Motorola Mobility
- Type: Smartphone
- Series: Motorola Edge 60 Series
- First released: April 30, 2025
- Predecessor: Motorola Edge 50 Pro
- Compatible networks: GSM / HSPA / LTE / 5G
- Form factor: Slate
- Colors: Pantone Shadow; Pantone Dazzling Blue; Pantone Sparkling Grape
- Dimensions: 160.7 mm × 73.1 mm × 8.2 mm (6.33 in × 2.88 in × 0.32 in)
- Weight: 186 g (6.6 oz)
- Operating system: Android 15 (up to 3 major Android upgrades)
- System-on-chip: MediaTek Dimensity 8350 Extreme (4 nm)
- CPU: Octa-core (1×3.35 GHz Cortex-A715 & 3×3.20 GHz Cortex-A715 & 4×2.20 GHz Cortex-A510)
- GPU: Mali-G615 MC6
- Modem: Integrated 5G
- Memory: 8 GB or 12 GB LPDDR5X (region dependent)
- Storage: 256 GB or 512 GB UFS 4.0
- SIM: Nano-SIM; Nano-SIM + eSIM; Nano-SIM + Nano-SIM
- Battery: 6000 mAh Si/C Li-Ion
- Charging: 90W wired (PD3.0); 15W wireless; 5W reverse wired
- Rear camera: 50 MP Sony LYT-700C, f/1.8, 24 mm (wide), 1/1.56", PDAF, OIS; 10 MP Samsung S5K3K1, f/2.0, 73 mm (telephoto), PDAF, 3× optical zoom, OIS; 50 MP Samsung S5KJNS, f/2.0, 120° (ultrawide camera), PDAF; Rear video: 4K@30fps, 1080p@30/60/120/240fps, HDR10+, gyro-EIS
- Front camera: 50 MP Samsung S5KJNS, f/2.0 (wide): Front video: 4K@30fps, 1080p@30/120fps
- Display: 6.7 in (170 mm) P-OLED, dual-edge, 1B colors 1220 × 2712 px @ 120 Hz; HDR10+, up to 4500 nits (peak), ~1400 nits (peak) (HBM); Corning Gorilla Glass 7i
- Sound: Stereo speakers with Dolby Atmos; 24-bit/192 kHz Hi-Res audio
- Connectivity: Wi-Fi 6E (802.11a/b/g/n/ac/6e); Bluetooth 5.4; NFC; USB-C (OTG); GPS (L1+L5), GLONASS, Galileo, BDS, NavIC
- Water resistance: IP68/IP69 dust-tight and water resistant (up to 1.5 m for 30 min; high-pressure water jets)
- Other: Under-display optical fingerprint sensor, MIL-STD-810H compliant, Smart Connect

Motorola Edge 60 Pro is an Android-based smartphone developed and manufactured by Motorola Mobility. It was announced on 24 April 2025 and released on 30 April 2025 as part of the Motorola Edge 60 series, which also includes the Edge 60, Edge 60 Fusion, Edge 60 Stylus, and Edge 60s.

== Specifications ==
=== Display ===
The Motorola Edge 60 Pro features a 6.7-inch dual-edge P-OLED display with a resolution of 1220 × 2712 pixels and a 20:9 aspect ratio. The panel supports a 120 Hz refresh rate, HDR10+, 1 billion colors, and up to 4500 nits (peak) peak brightness, with approximately 1400 nits (peak) in high brightness mode. The screen-to-body ratio is approximately 92%. Screen protection is provided by Corning Gorilla Glass 7i. An optical fingerprint sensor is integrated under the display.

=== Performance ===
The device is powered by the MediaTek Dimensity 8350 Extreme chipset manufactured on a 4 nm process. It includes an octa-core CPU and a Mali-G615 MC6 GPU. Memory options include 8 GB or 12 GB of LPDDR5X RAM, paired with 256 GB or 512 GB of UFS 4.0 internal storage. In benchmark testing, the device achieved approximately 1.37 million points in AnTuTu v10.

=== Camera ===
The Motorola Edge 60 Pro is equipped with a triple rear camera system consisting of a 50 MP wide camera using a Sony LYT-700C sensor with optical image stabilization, a 10 MP telephoto camera with 3× optical zoom and OIS, and a 50 MP ultrawide camera with a 120-degree field of view. Camera features include a color spectrum sensor, HDR, panorama, and Pantone Validated Colour and Skin Tones. Video recording supports up to 4K at 30 fps. The front-facing camera uses a 50 MP sensor and supports 4K video recording.

=== Build and durability ===
The phone features a glass front protected by Gorilla Glass 7i, a plastic frame, and a silicone polymer (eco leather) back. It measures 160.7 × 73.1 × 8.2 mm and weighs 186 g. The device is rated IP68/IP69 for dust and water resistance and meets MIL-STD-810H testing standards, though this does not guarantee ruggedness or suitability for extreme conditions.

=== Battery ===
The Motorola Edge 60 Pro includes a 6000 mAh silicon-carbon lithium-ion battery. It supports up to 90 W wired charging using the PD3.0 standard, 15 W wireless charging, and 5 W reverse wired charging.

== Software ==
The device ships with Android 15 and is eligible for up to three major Android version upgrades. Motorola includes Smart Connect features for multi-device interoperability.
