= Moto E =

Moto E or variation may refer to:

== Motorcycling ==
- MotoE World Championship, FIM electric prototype superbike motorcycle racing championship
- FIM eRoad Racing World Cup, electric superbike motorcycle championship in 2013
- Energica Ego, the Ego electric motorcycle family from the Energica Motor Company used for the various FIM MotoE series

== Motorola ==
- Motorola Moto E series of mobile phones
  - Moto E (1st generation) 2014
  - Moto E (2nd generation) 2015
  - Moto E3 (3rd generation) 2016
  - Moto E4 (4th generation) 2017
  - Moto E5 (5th generation) 2018
  - Moto E6 (6th generation) 2019
  - Moto E7 (7th generation) 2020
  - Moto E (2020)

== See also ==
- Motorola Moto, a brand of Motorola Mobility including a wider range of products
- MotoGP, family of motorcycle racing grand prix
- Emoto
- Moto (disambiguation)
- E (disambiguation)
