= Emoto =

Emoto (Japanese: 柄本) is a Japanese surname and may refer to:

- Akira Emoto (born 1948), Japanese actor
- Ayao Emoto (1895–1978), Japanese photographer
- Masaru Emoto (1943–2014), Japanese author
- Naho Emoto (born 1985), Japanese softball player
- Tasuku Emoto (born 1986), Japanese actor
- Yuko Emoto (born 1972), Japanese judoka
