= Moto G (2nd generation) =

Android smartphone developed by Motorola Mobility

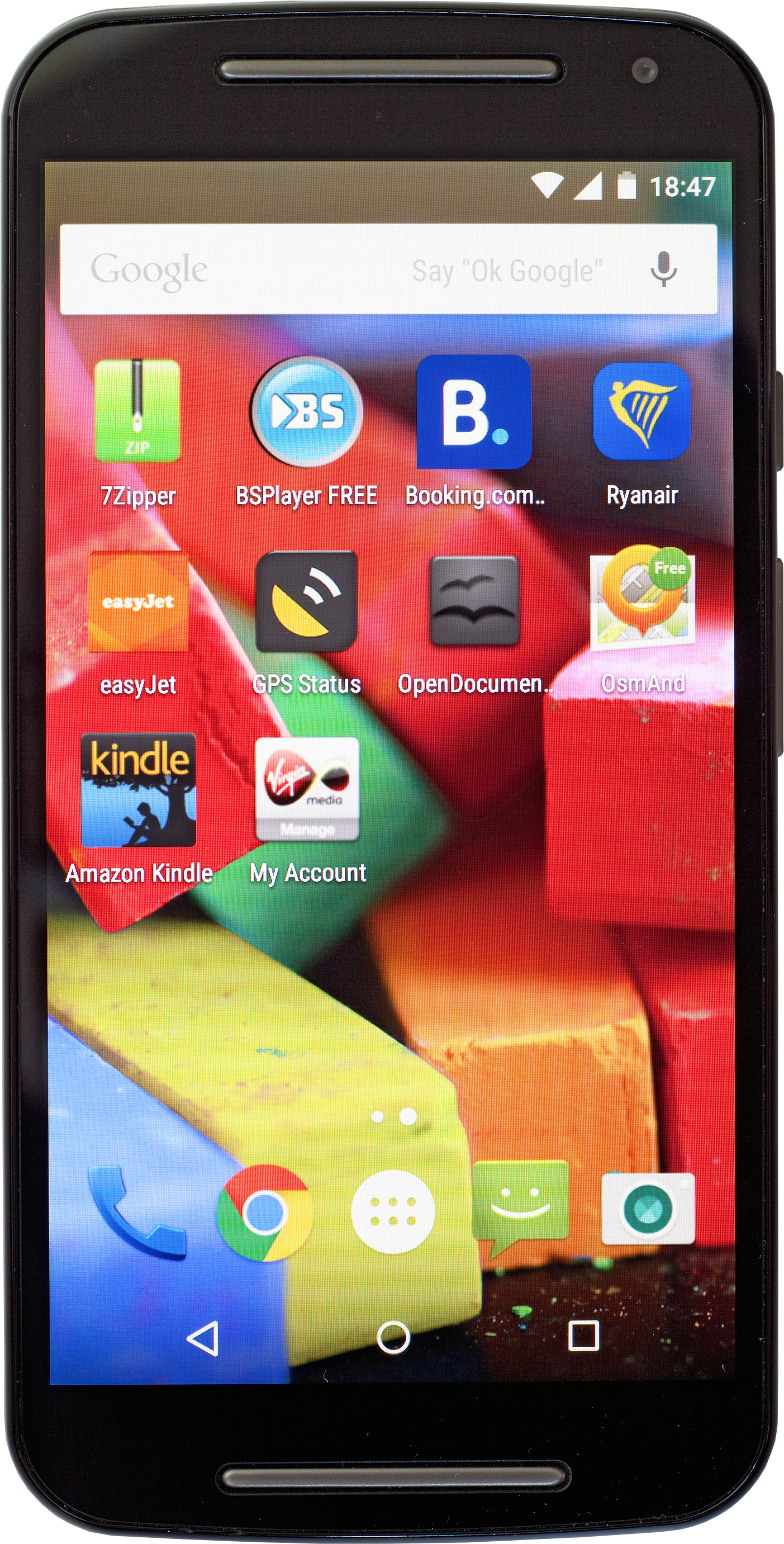
- Moto G running Android 5.0.2 "Lollipop"
- Manufacturer: Motorola Mobility
- Type: Smartphone
- Series: Motorola Moto
- First released: September 5, 2014; 12 years ago
- Predecessor: Moto G (1st generation); Droid Mini
- Successor: Moto G (3rd generation)
- Related: Moto X (2nd generation); Moto E (2nd generation)
- Compatible networks: GSM/GPRS/EDGE (850, 900, 1800, 1900 MHz) UMTS/HSPA+ up to 21 Mb/s (850, 900, 1900, 2100 MHz) FDD LTE 2100/1800/2600/800 (Bands 1, 3, 7, 20) TDD LTE 1900/2300/2500/2600 (Bands 38, 39, 40, 41)
- Form factor: Touchscreen
- Dimensions: 141.5 mm (5.57 in) H 70.7 mm (2.78 in) W 11 mm (0.43 in) D
- Weight: 149 g (5.3 oz)
- Operating system: Original: Android 4.4.4 "KitKat"; Current: Android 6.0 "Marshmallow"
- System-on-chip: Qualcomm Snapdragon 400 processor with 1.2 GHz quad-core ARM CPU
- GPU: Adreno 305
- Memory: 1 GB LPDDR3 RAM
- Storage: 8 GB internal storage; Micro SD card up to 32 GB, and Micro SD card up to 150GB.
- Battery: 2070 mAh Li-ion non-removable 2390 mAh Li-ion (4G version) non-removable
- Rear camera: 8 megapixels (3264×2448 px), autofocus, LED flash
- Front camera: 2.0 megapixels (720p) HD video recording @ 30 fps
- Display: 5.0 in (130 mm) 1280x720 px (294 ppi) HD; Gorilla Glass 3
- Sound: Two front-facing speakers; two microphones
- Connectivity: Wi-Fi 802.11 b/g/n, BT 4.0LE, Micro-USB, 3.5 mm headset jack
- Model: G-2PW4100 G-2PW4200
- Codename: Titan, Thea (LTE)
- Development status: Discontinued with Motorola
- Website: Moto G 2nd Gen at the Wayback Machine (archived 2014-09-16)

The second-generation Moto G (marketed as simply Moto G) is an Android smartphone developed by Motorola Mobility (a subsidiary of Google when it was launched, but then becoming a subsidiary of Lenovo). Released on September 6, 2014, it is a successor to the original Moto G released in 2013. The phone was initially aimed at developing markets, although it is also available in developed markets as a lower-cost option compared to other phones in its class.

== Release and availability ==
The phone was unveiled along with the second-generation Moto X, Moto 360, and Moto Hint in India and the U.S. at their respective events in September 2014. It has a U.S. pricing of US$179.99 with no contract for the 8 GB version. This phone was launched in India on Flipkart in September 2014. Only the 16 GB dual SIM variant of this phone is available in India with the model number XT1068 priced at ₹12,999.

As of January 2015, a 4G 16 GB variant was made available in Brazil only. The 4G chip on this model is not compatible with all countries. It has many of the same specifications as the 3G variant, including screen, cameras, dual SIM capability, MicroSD expansion and processor, though it comes standard with Android 5.0.2 "Lollipop", has a larger 2,390mAh battery and a minimum 16 GB of storage (depending on purchase). As of March 2015, the LTE variant (XT1072) was available in the UK.

The LTE variant (XT1079) of the phone has been available in India since October 2015; it started at a price of ₹8999.

== Hardware ==
=== Specifications ===
The phone features a 5-inch HD LCD IPS screen, coated with Gorilla Glass 3, Google Android 4.4.4 KitKat operating system, a Qualcomm Snapdragon 400 quad-core processor clocked at 1.2 GHz, 1 GB of RAM, a "splashproof" coating, curved back, and front-mounted stereo speakers below and above the screen. The Moto G can come with 8 or 16 GB of internal storage. The user can add an additional 32 GB, or perhaps even more, using a MicroSD card.

All variants of the phone support 2G and 3G connectivity; the XT1072 and XT1079 models also support 4G/LTE The phone is available in a dual SIM model in selected markets.

The phone includes a non-removable 2070 mAh battery (2390 mAh for the 4G version), which Motorola touts as providing "all-day" battery life. The phone supports Qualcomm Quick Charge 2.0 fast charging, if used with a charger that supports Quick Charge 2.0 or better.

The Moto G features an 8-megapixel rear-facing auto-focus camera with flash and a front-facing 2-megapixel camera. The device is available in either black or white front colors, and has an interchangeable rear cover with different color options.

The Moto G shares its design language with the Moto X and Moto E, although there are some key differences between them. To cut costs, the Moto G lacks the Moto X's low-power coprocessor that would allow active notifications, quick capture, and touchless control. The Moto G's Lollipop update added Ambient Display, albeit limited to new notifications.

=== Model variants ===
All variants support the four 2G GSM bands 850 / 900 / 1800 / 1900 MHz.

Version	Description
XT1063	Global GSM, Single SIM
XT1064	US/Canada GSM, Single SIM
XT1068	Global GSM, Dual SIM, EU, Colombia
XT1069	GSM+DTV, Dual SIM, Brazil model supporting DTV or LTE
XT1072	LTE, Single SIM, EU model
XT1077	LTE, Dual SIM, China, 8/16 GB
XT1078	4G, Dual SIM, Brazil, 16 GB
XT1079	LTE, Dual SIM, India/China, 16GB

=== Official accessories ===
As a part of customizing the phone, Motorola released replaceable back covers and flip covers both in the following colours; Liquorice, Chalk, Cherry Red, Turquoise, Royal Blue, Violet, Spearmint Green, and Lemon/Lime. The "Moto Maker" service is not available for this handset.

== Software ==
The second-generation Moto G was initially shipped with Android 4.4.4 "KitKat". It provided a mostly-stock Android user experience, but did have some additional features. These features included:

- Moto Alert, which lets users notify others of their location;
- Moto Assist, which automatically enables or disables certain modes, such as silencing the ringer or auto-replying to text messages, depending on the situation — such as when a user is in a meeting as determined by their calendar, or driving;
- and Motorola Migrate.

The handset comes preloaded with Google Now Launcher as the default home-screen launcher. Nowadays, it ships with Android 5.0 "Lollipop" and can be easily updated to Android 6.0.0 "Marshmallow".

=== Firmware updates ===
The second-generation Moto G received an Android 4.4.4 "KitKat" maintenance update in September 2014. The update was for version 21.11.23 and includes various bug fixes and performance improvements. The main changes noticed in this update are: the Google Now Launcher, an improvement in battery life, new language and input options, a new camera picture-taking sound, and a new design for the "Powered By Android" logo on the boot screen.

The Android 5.0 "Lollipop" update began rolling out in November 2014. This update was for version 22.11.6. The Pure Edition of this phone in the US (the carrier-unlocked version) became the world's first mobile phone, after Google's current Nexus models, to be updated to Android 5.0 Lollipop.

The Android Lollipop 5.0.2 update became available in several non-US countries including Australia, Germany, India, and the United Kingdom in January/February 2015.

In India, the Marshmallow update was rolled out for the second-generation Moto G in February 2016. Motorola has published the release notes for the Android 6.0 Marshmallow update, which include details on the enhancements included in the update.

== Critical reception ==
The second-generation Moto G received extremely positive reviews from critics with several websites calling it one of the best budget smartphones of 2014. It was mainly praised for its smooth performance after its Lollipop update. Michael Sawh of trustedreviews.com gave it 9 out of 10 stars, praising its strong battery life and excellent value for money. GSMchoice claims that the phone is a good quality product. However, compared to the previous model, it did not offer anything special. According to GSMchoice, the second-generation Moto G's advantages are: dual SIM, micro SD card slot, USB On-The-Go, good stereo speakers, good quality camera, good call quality, and all the features that most users need without adding bloat. Disadvantages include a poor sales package, the durability of the plastic bezel, and a lack of LTE in some models.
