= Moto C =

Android smartphone developed by Motorola Mobility

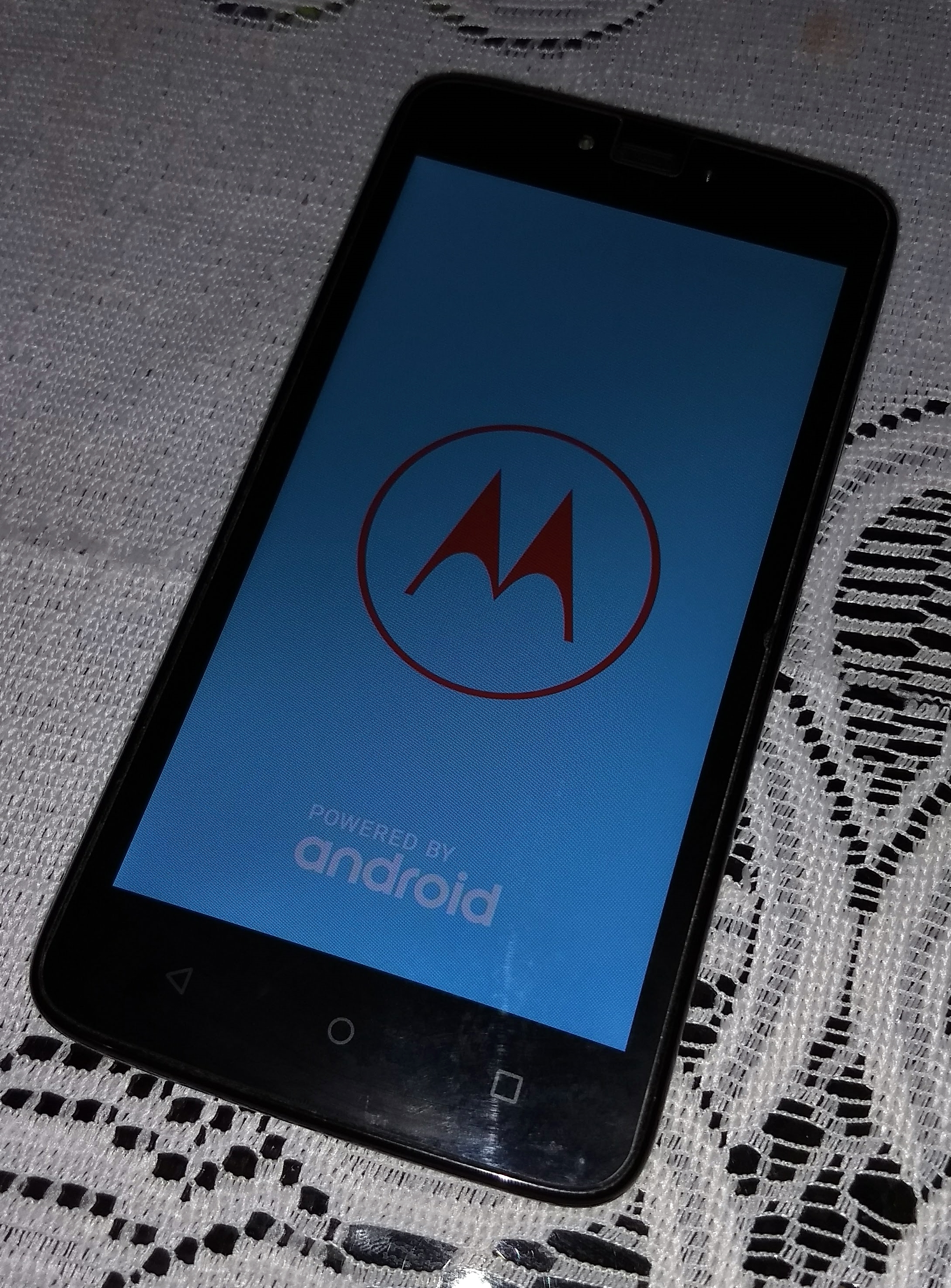
- Moto C XT1750 Latin America model
- Brand: Motorola
- Manufacturer: Motorola Mobility
- Type: Smartphone
- Related: Moto E4
- Form factor: Slate
- Colors: Starry Black, Metallic Cherry, Pearl White, Fine Gold
- Dimensions: Moto C: 145.5 mm (5.73 in) H 73.6 mm (2.90 in) W 9 mm (0.35 in); Moto C Plus: 144 mm (5.7 in) H 72.3 mm (2.85 in) W 10 mm (0.39 in)
- Weight: Moto C: 154 g (5.4 oz); Moto C Plus: 162 g (5.7 oz)
- Operating system: Android 7.0 "Nougat"
- System-on-chip: Moto C: MediaTek MT6737M; Moto C Plus: MediaTek MT6737
- CPU: Moto C: 1.1 GHz quad core ARM Cortex-A53; Moto C Plus: 1.3 GHz quad core ARM Cortex-A53
- GPU: Moto C: ARM Mali T720-MP1; Moto C Plus: ARM Mali T720-MP2 (650 MHz)
- Memory: Moto C: 1 GB RAM; Moto C Plus: 1 or 2 GB RAM
- Storage: Moto C: 8 or 16 GB; Moto C Plus: 16 GB
- Battery: Moto C: 2350 mAh; Moto C Plus: 4000 mAh
- Rear camera: Moto C: 5 MP with 1.4 micron pixels, 74-degree field of view, fixed focus, an LED flash, and 720p video recording support Moto C Plus: 8 MP with f/2.2 aperture, 1.12 micron pixels, autofocus, 71-degree field of view, and an LED flash
- Front camera: 2 MP
- Display: Moto C: 5-inch TFT LCD with FWVGA resolution (854 x 480 pixels); Moto C Plus: 5-inch IPS LCD with HD resolution (1280x720 pixels)
- Model: Moto C: XT1750, XT1754, XT1755, XT1756, XT1757, XT1758; Moto C Plus: XT1721, XT1723, XT1724, XT1725, XT1726
- Codename: Moto C: Watson; Moro C Plus: Namath

The Moto C and Moto C Plus are Android smartphones developed by Motorola Mobility, a subsidiary of Lenovo. They are low-end devices developed primarily for the emerging markets. They were released on May 1, 2017.

The focus of these handsets is on offering reasonable specifications at a low price. This is an attempt to counter the advance of manufacturers that offer low cost smartphones.

== Specifications ==
=== Moto C ===
Sources:

- Dimensions: 145.5 x 73.6 x 9 mm
- Weight: 154g
- Color options: Metallic Cherry, Pearl White, Fine Gold, and Starry Black
- Battery: 2,350 mAh (removable)
- SoC: MediaTek MT6737M
- CPU: 1.1 GHz quad-core ARM Cortex-A53 64-bit processor
- GPU: ARM Mali T720-MP1
- Operating system: Android 7.0 Nougat
- Screen: 5 inch display with 854 x 480 resolution
- Memory: 1 GB RAM,
- Storage: 8 GB or 16 GB internal storage expandable up to 32 GB.
- Rear camera: 5 MP rear camera with 1.4 micron (μm) pixels, 74-degree field of view, fixed focus, an LED flash, and 720p video recording support
- Front camera: 2 MP front camera with 1 micron (μm) pixels, 63-degree field of view, fixed focus and an LED flash

=== Moto C Plus ===
Sources:

- Dimensions: 144 x 72.3 x 10 mm
- Weight: 162g
- Color options: Metallic Cherry, Pearl White, Fine Gold, and Starry Black
- Battery: 4,000 mAh (removable)
- SoC: MediaTek MT6737
- Processor: 1.3 GHz quad-core ARM Cortex-A53 64-bit processor
- GPU: ARM Mali T720-MP2
- Operating system: Android 7.0 Nougat
- Screen: 5 inch HD display with 1280 x 720 resolution
- Memory: 1 GB or 2 GB RAM
- Storage: 16 GB internal storage expandable up to 32 GB
- Rear camera: 8 MP rear camera with f/2.2 aperture, 1.12 micron pixels, autofocus, 71-degree field of view and an LED flash
- Front camera: 2 MP front camera
- Dual SIM

== See also ==
- Moto E4
