= Moto E (2nd generation) =

Android smartphone developed by Motorola Mobility

Moto E 2nd Generation
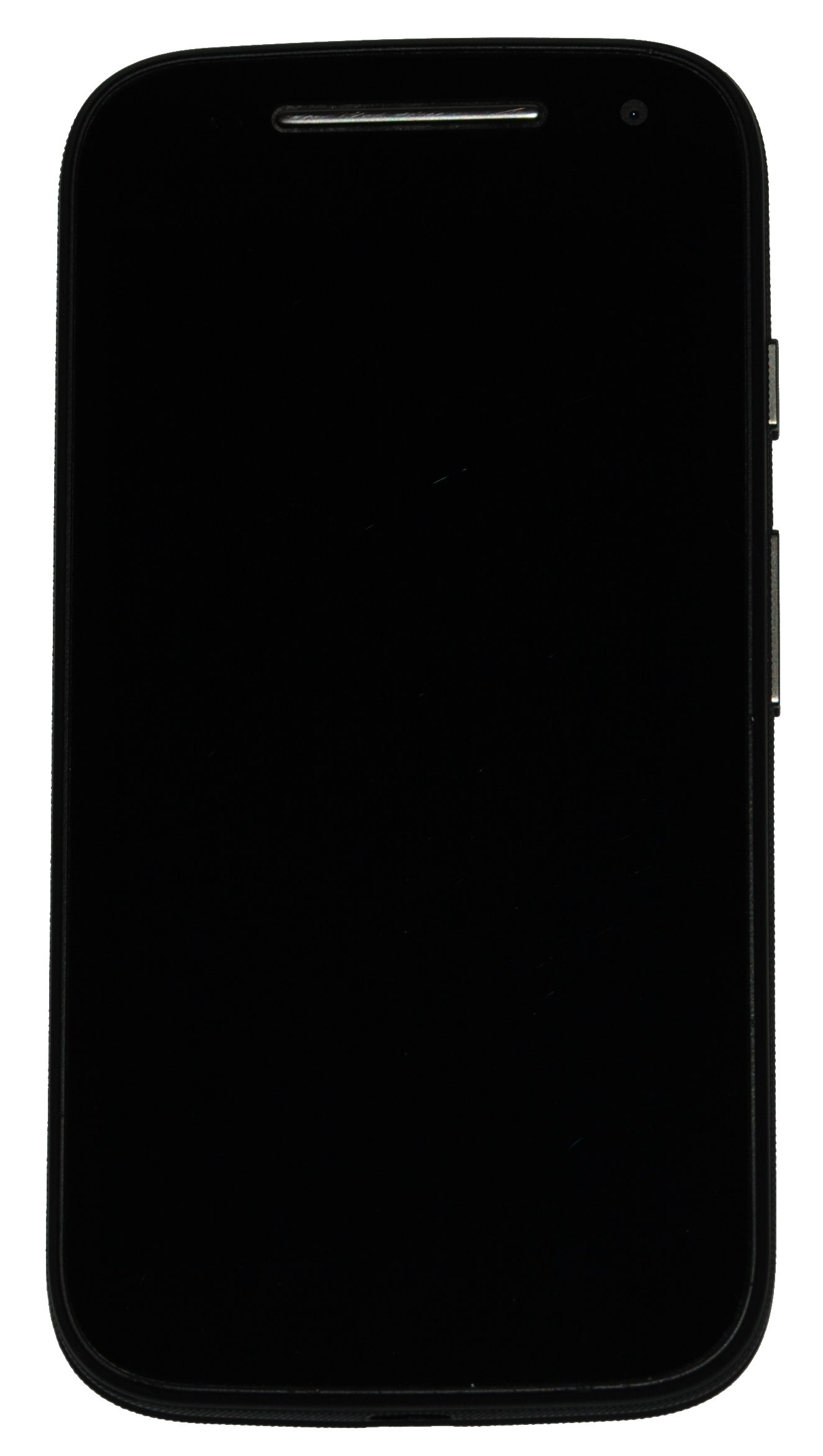
- Manufacturer: Motorola Mobility
- Type: Smartphone
- First released: February 25, 2015
- Availability by region: Yes
- Predecessor: Moto E (1st generation)
- Successor: Moto E3
- Related: Moto G (2nd generation); Moto X (2nd generation)
- Compatible networks: 3G Model: GSM/GPRS/EDGE (850, 900, 1800, 1900 MHz); UMTS/HSPA+ up to 21 Mbps (850, 900, 1900, 2100 MHz); 4G Model: 2G/3G/4G
- Form factor: Bar
- Dimensions: 129.9 mm (5.11 in) H 66.8 mm (2.63 in) W 12.3 mm (0.48 in) D
- Weight: 145 g (5.1 oz)
- Operating system: Android 5.0.2 Lollipop (3G Model: Upgradeable to 5.1.1 Lollipop) (4G Model: Upgradeable to 6.0 Marshmallow)
- System-on-chip: 3G Model: Qualcomm Snapdragon 200; 4G Model: Qualcomm Snapdragon 410
- CPU: Quad-core 1.2 GHz Cortex-A7 - 3G modelARM Quad-core 1.2 GHz Cortex-A53 - LTE model ARM
- GPU: 3G Model: Adreno 302; 4G Model: Adreno 306
- Memory: 1 GB RAM
- Storage: 8 GB Flash
- Removable storage: MicroSDHC (up to 32 GB)
- Battery: 2390 mAh
- Rear camera: 5 MP, f/2.2, autofocus, no flash
- Front camera: (VGA)0.3 MP
- Display: 4.5 in (110 mm) IPS LCD capacitive touchscreen, 16M colors 540x960 px (245 ppi), Corning Gorilla Glass, oleophobic coating
- Sound: Front-facing mono speaker
- Connectivity: GPS / GLONASS, Wi-Fi 802.11 b/g/n, Bluetooth 4.0, FM Radio, Micro USB, 3.5mm audio jack
- Codename: 3G Model: Otus; 4G Model: Surnia

The second generation Moto E (marketed as the New Moto E) is an Android smartphone developed by Motorola Mobility. Released on February 25, 2015, it is a successor to the Moto E released in 2014. The New Moto E is a low-end device for first-time smartphone owners or budget-minded consumers, and is available in 40 countries worldwide.

== Hardware ==
The second generation Moto E has a 4.5-inch 540p LCD screen, 1.2 GHz quad core processor, 1 GB RAM, storage of 8 GB (5.47 GB is user accessible) with microSD card slot (supports expandable storage of up to 32 GB). It also has a water-resistant coating that protects it from light water splashes; however, the phone itself is not water-resistant. It is available in either 3G or 4G LTE. The 3G version has a Snapdragon 200 SoC while the 4G LTE version runs a Snapdragon 410 SoC.

The rear camera is a 5 MP shooter but lacks an LED flash; it also has a VGA front-facing camera. It has a 2390 mAh Li-ion battery that is not user-replaceable. It does not have an LED notification light, as it uses Motorola's Moto Display technology, making it the first budget phone to include this feature. It also features a Corning Gorilla Glass 3 display, making it scratch-resistant but not shatter-resistant. It does not feature a removable back cover; the SIM and Micro SD card slots are located under a removable plastic outer band - the "Motorola Band", which Motorola calls "accent bands". These are available directly from Motorola in packs of three; aside from the stock black and white, there are six other colors to choose from.

== Software ==
The smartphone was initially launched with Android 5.0.2 "Lollipop", but was updated to 5.1.1 "Lollipop". The 4G variant of the Moto E was updated to 6.0 "Marshmallow" in February 2016, in limited countries/regions only.

Motorola had promised that it would push future Android version updates to the Moto E, but the phone was not included in the initial list to be updated to Android 6.0 "Marshmallow". Motorola later announced that the LTE version of Moto E would receive the update in Canada, Latin America, Europe and Asia (except China).

== Generation comparison ==
| | 1st Gen (2014) | 2nd Gen (2015) | 3rd Gen (2016) |
|---|---|---|---|
| Internal storage | 4 GB | 8 GB | 16 GB |
| Display | 4.3-inch (540 x 960) | 4.5-inch (256 ppi, 540 x 960) | 5-inch (294 ppi, 720 x 1280) |
| Processor | Snapdragon 200 | 4G - Snapdragon 410; 3G - Snapdragon 200 | 1 GHz MediaTek MT6753P |
| Memory | 1 GB | 1 GB | 2 GB |
| Rear camera | 5 MP | 5 MP | 8 MP |
| Front camera | No | Yes, 0.3 MP | Yes, 5 MP |
| Flash | No | No | Yes |
| Quick launch camera | none | Double twist | Press power twice |
| Android version | 4.4 KitKat (at launch) | 5.0.2 Lollipop (at launch) | 6.0 Marshmallow |
| Removable battery | No, 1980 mAh | No, 2390 mAh | Yes, 3500mAh |

All three generations use micro-SIMs and use micro-USB B power connectors.

== Models ==
There are two models of the 2nd generation Moto E:

3G - Otus - with a Snapdragon 200

- XT1505 - Global models
- XT1506 - Global, Dual SIM
- XT1511 - US model

4G/LTE - Surnia - with a Snapdragon 410

- XT1514 - Brazil, Dual SIM
- XT1521 - Global, Dual SIM
- XT1523 - Brazil, Dual Sim, 16 GB
- XT1524 - Global models
- XT1526 - 4G/LTE (CDMA) for Sprint (Sprint Prepaid, Boost, Virgin Mobile), US
- XT1527 - USA model
- XT1528 - 4G/LTE (CDMA) for Verizon Prepaid, US
- XT1529 - 4G/LTE (CDMA) for LTE in Rural America (LRA) Partners

== Official accessories ==
To customize the phone, Motorola released the new Moto E with either a black or white bezel. Motorola released replaceable color bands (yellow, turquoise, blue, raspberry, purple, and red) in addition to larger "Grip Shell" cases.

== Press release ==
In February 2015, Motorola shipped promo boxes to various members of the press, to arrive on the 25th. Inside the box was a mock-press conference to announce the phone. The box contained a miniature stage, a press pass, a Moto E, and a replaceable color band.

On 18 August 2015, Lenovo announced that it had begun manufacturing Motorola smartphones at a plant in Sriperumbudur, near Chennai, India, run by the Singapore-based contract manufacturer Flextronics International Ltd. The first smartphone manufactured at the facility was the 4G Moto E (2nd generation).

== Reception ==
The Ars Technica reviewers praised the phone for being well-built, having a decent screen, near-stock Android, decent performance, and excellent battery life. They did not like the camera, the limited storage, lack of NFC for mobile payments and that the $119 model (3G only) didn't have some of the $149 model's best features.
