= Moto E4 =

Android smartphone developed by Motorola Mobility

- Manufacturer: Motorola
- Type: Smartphone
- Series: Moto E Family
- Predecessor: Moto E3
- Successor: Moto E5
- Dimensions: 144.7 mm (5.70 in) H 72.3 mm (2.85 in) W 9.3 mm (0.37 in) D
- Weight: 198 g (6.98 oz)
- Operating system: Android 7.1.1 "Nougat"
- System-on-chip: Qualcomm Snapdragon 427 (USA); Mediatek MT6737 (Europe)
- CPU: 4x1.4 GHz or 4x1.3 GHz Cortex-A53
- GPU: Adreno 308 or Mali T720
- Memory: 2 GB / 3 GB RAM
- Storage: 16 GB / 32 GB
- Battery: 2,800 mAh Li-Ion replaceable / 5,000 mAh Li-Ion non-replaceable
- Rear camera: 8 MP, f/2.2 aperture, LED flash 13 MP, f/2.0 aperture, LED flash
- Front camera: 5 MP, f/2.2 aperture, 1.4 μm pixel size, LED flash
- Display: 5.0 in (130 mm), 1280 x 720 pixel resolution (293 ppi) / 5.5 in (140 mm), 1280 x 720 pixel resolution (267 ppi)
- Codename: perry(for Qualcomm variant) woods(for Mediatek variant)
- Other: Proximity; Accelerometer; Fingerprint sensor (most models); FM Radio; Compass; Fast Charging
- Website: www.motorola.com/us/products/moto-e-gen-4 (USA) www.motorola.com/we/products/moto-e-gen-4 (Europe)

The Moto E4 and Moto E4 Plus are Android smartphones developed by Motorola Mobility, a subsidiary of Lenovo. They were released in June 2017. The phones are regarded as being low-budget and having a long battery life. The E4 model has a 2,800 mAh battery, and the E4 Plus has a 5,000 mAh battery. The Moto E4 has an 8 megapixel camera, while the Plus version has a 13 megapixel one. Both Moto E4 variants also have custom ROMs available.

== Generation comparison ==
	Moto E4 (2017)	Moto E4 Plus (2017)
Internal storage	16 GB	16 GB
Display	5.0 inch	5.5 inch
Processor	Europe: Mediatek MT6737; USA: Snapdragon 425	Europe and India: Mediatek MT6737; USA: Snapdragon 425 and 427
Memory	2 GB	3 GB
Rear camera	8 MP	13 MP
Front camera	Yes, 5 MP	Yes, 5 MP
Flash	Yes	Yes
Quick launch camera	Yes	Yes
Android version	7.1.1 (at launch)	7.1.1 (at launch)
NFC	Yes (USA: No)	Yes (USA: No)
Removable battery	Yes, 2800 mAh replaceable	No, 5000 mAh non-replaceable

All generations use:

- micro-SIMs
- micro-USB B power connectors
- Bluetooth version is 4.2 LE.

A fingerprint sensor is included on the unlocked E4 and the E4 for Verizon and for U.S. Cellular. A fingerprint sensor is not included with the Sprint, MetroPCS, and Virgin Mobile E4 models.

== See also ==
- Moto C
