= Moto E5 =

Android smartphone developed by Motorola Mobility

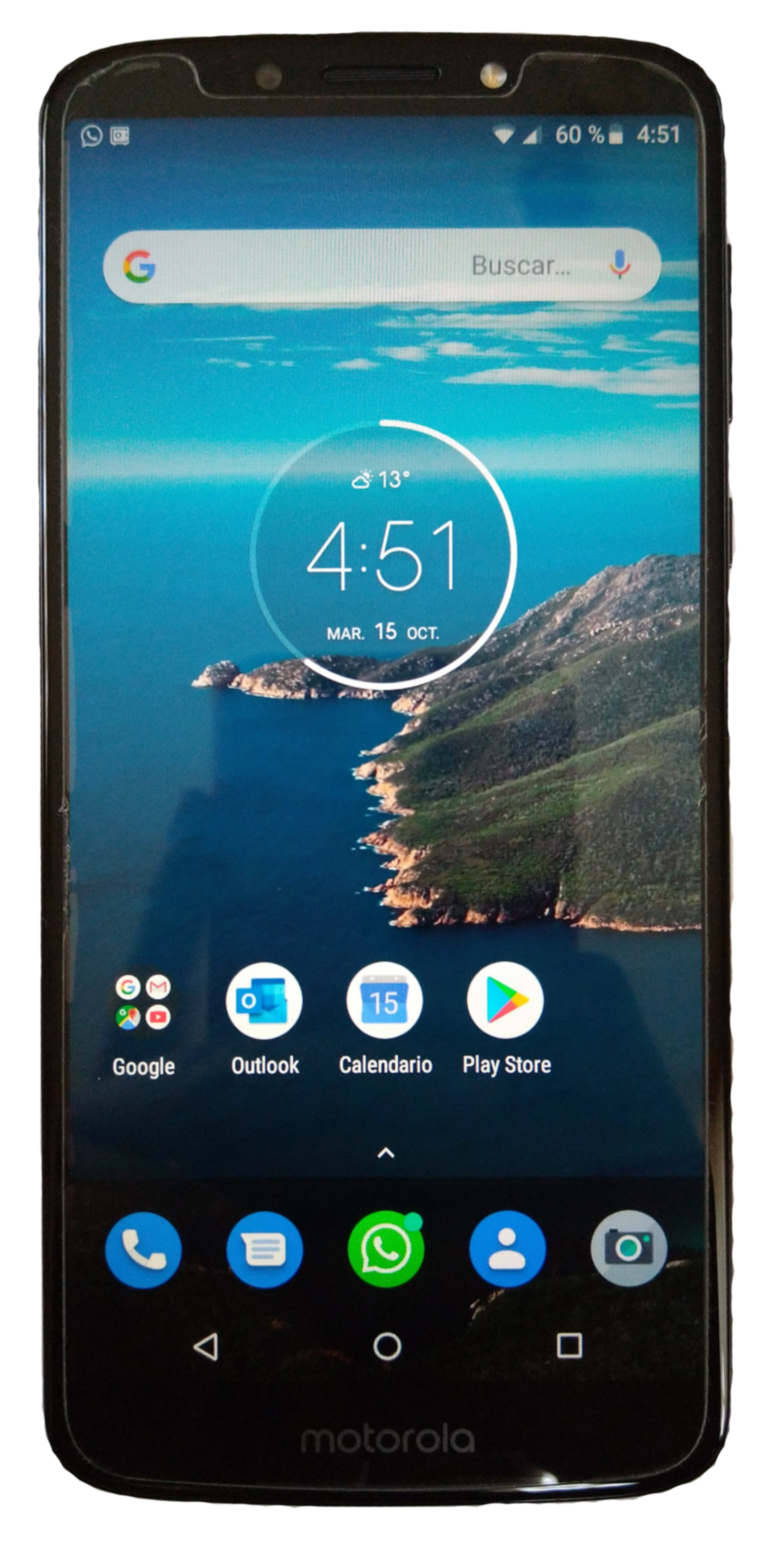
- Moto E5 Plus XT1924-1 Indian Version
- Manufacturer: Motorola
- Type: Smartphone
- Series: Moto E Family
- First released: April 10, 2018; 8 years ago
- Predecessor: Moto E4
- Successor: Moto E6
- Form factor: Slate
- Weight: 174 g (6.1 oz)
- Operating system: Android 8.1.0 "Oreo"
- GPU: Adreno 308
- Memory: 2GB
- Storage: 16GB
- SIM: MicroSIM
- Battery: 4000 mAh (fixed)
- Charging: 10W (p/h)
- Rear camera: LED Flash; 1080P@30fps; 720P@30fps; 480P@30fps
- Front camera: 5MP
- Display: 5.7", IPS LCD, 1440x720
- Connectivity: Bluetooth 4.2 LE; Micro USB 2.0; Wii 802.11a/b/g/n 2.4/5.0 GHz; 3.5 mm headphone jack
- Other: Proximity sensor Accelerometer; Fingerprint reader Ambient light sensor Magnetometer; FM radio GPS, A-GPS, GLONASS

The Moto E5 is the 5th generation of the low-end Moto E family of Android smart phones developed by Motorola Mobility. It comprises three submodels: E5 Play, E5 and E5 Plus. They were released in April 2018. The base model costs $99, putting this phone in the budget segment of the smartphone market. This phone is often praised for having long battery life, although it tends to have low performance due to the dated processor and video card.

== Submodels comparison ==
USA market
	E5 Play	E5	E5 Plus
Internal storage	16 GB	16 GB	32 GB
Removable card storage	micro-SD 256 GB max	micro-SD 128 GB max	micro-SD 256 GB max
Display	5.2", LCD, 1280x720	5.7", IPS LCD, 1440x720	6", IPS LCD, 1440x720
System on Chip	QS 425/427, quad-core	QS 427, quad-core	QS 435, octa-core
CPU	4x 1.4 GHz Cortex A-53	4x 1.4 GHz Cortex A-53	4x 1.4 GHz Cortex A-53 + 4x 1.0 GHz Cortex A-53
GPU	Adreno 308	Adreno 308	Adreno 505
Memory	2 GB	2 GB	3 GB
Rear camera	8 MP, f/2.0 aperture	8 MP, f/2.2 aperture, autofocus	12 MP, f/2.0 aperture, PDAF and LAF
Front camera	5 MP	5 MP	8 MP, f/2.2 aperture
Gyroscope	No	No	Yes
Networks	4G LTE (Cat6), CDMA/EVDO Rev A, UMTS/HSPA+, GSM/EDGE	4G LTE (Cat4), CDMA/EVDO Rev A, UMTS/HSPA+, GSM/EDGE	4G LTE (Cat6), CDMA/EVDO Rev A, UMTS/HSPA+, GSM/EDGE
Network bands	2G: GSM band 2/3/5/8; CDMA BC0/BC1/BC10 3G: WCDMA band 1/2/4/5/8 4G: TDD LTE band 38/41(Full); FDD LTE band 1/2/3/4/5/7/8/12/13/14/17/25/26/29/30/66	2G: GSM band 2/3/5/8; CDMA BC0/BC1; 3G: WCDMA band 1/2/4/5/8 4G: FDD LTE band 1/2/4/5/8/12/13/66/71	2G: GSM band 2/3/5/8; CDMA BC0/BC1/BC10 3G: WCDMA band 1/2/4/5/8 4G: TDD LTE band 38/41(Full); FDD LTE band 1/2/3/4/5/7/8/12/13/14/17/25/26/29/30/66
Battery	2800 mAh (removable)	4000 mAh (fixed)	5000 mAh (fixed)
Dimensions (HxWxD)	151 x 74 x 8.85 mm (5.95 x 2.91 x 0.35 in)	155.4 mm × 72.2 mm × 8.95 mm (6.12 in × 2.84 in × 0.352 in)	161.9 mm × 75.3 mm × 9.35 mm (6.37 in × 2.96 in × 0.368 in)†
Charger	10 W	10 W	15 W TurboPower™
Weight	150 g (5.29 oz)	174 g (6.1 oz)	200 g (7.1 oz)

† Not counting camera bump, which adds 0.4 mm (0.016 in) to E5 Plus depth/thickness.

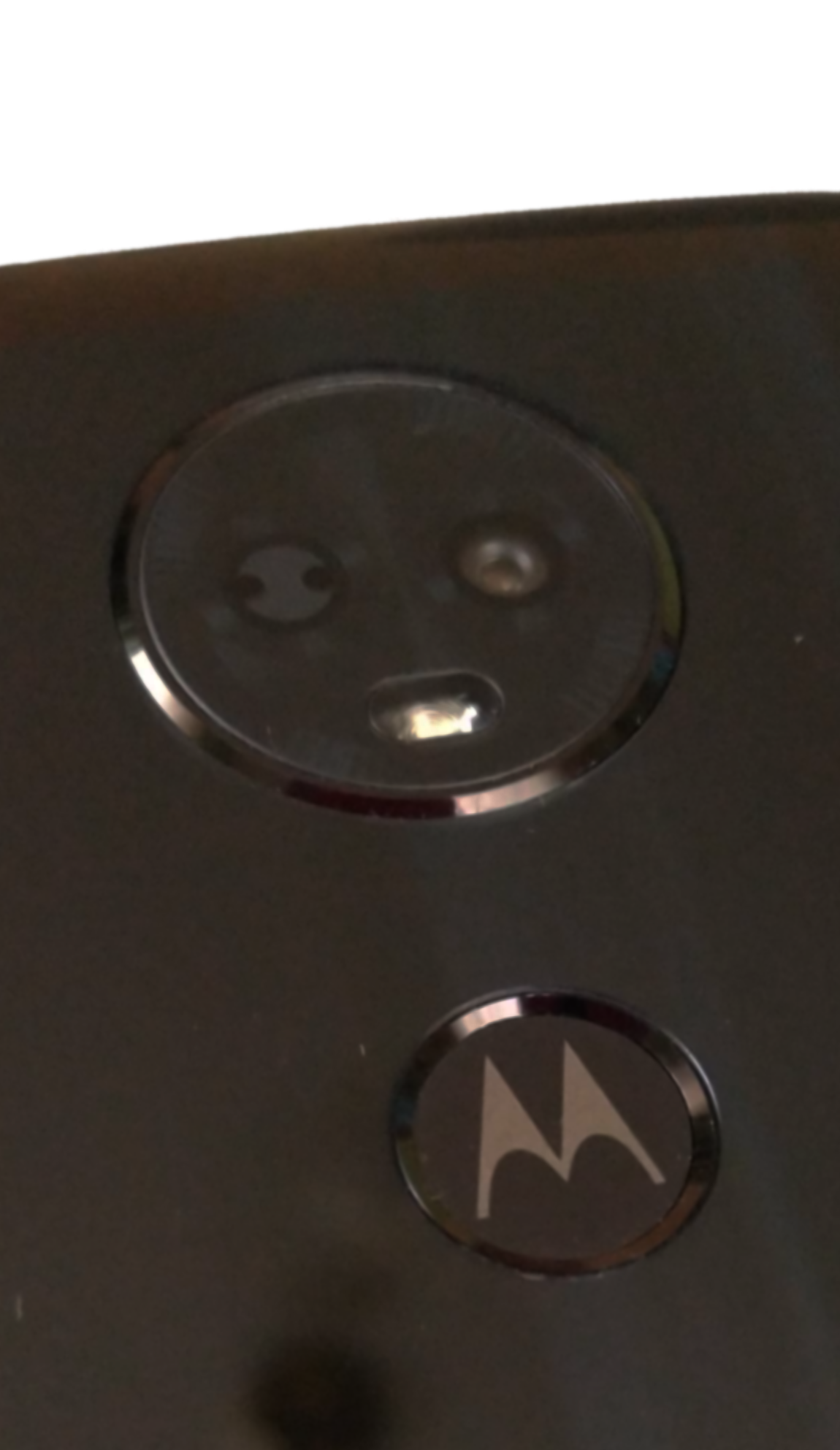
Moto E5 Plus camera sensor; In this, it is supposedly shown that the Moto E5 Plus has a dual camera, but in reality, it has a 12 MP camera
