= Ayao Emoto =

Japanese photographer

Ayao Emoto (江本 綾生, Emoto Ayao; 1895–1978) was a Japanese photographer.
