= Moto E3 =

Android smartphone developed by Motorola Mobility

Moto E3 Moto E3 Power
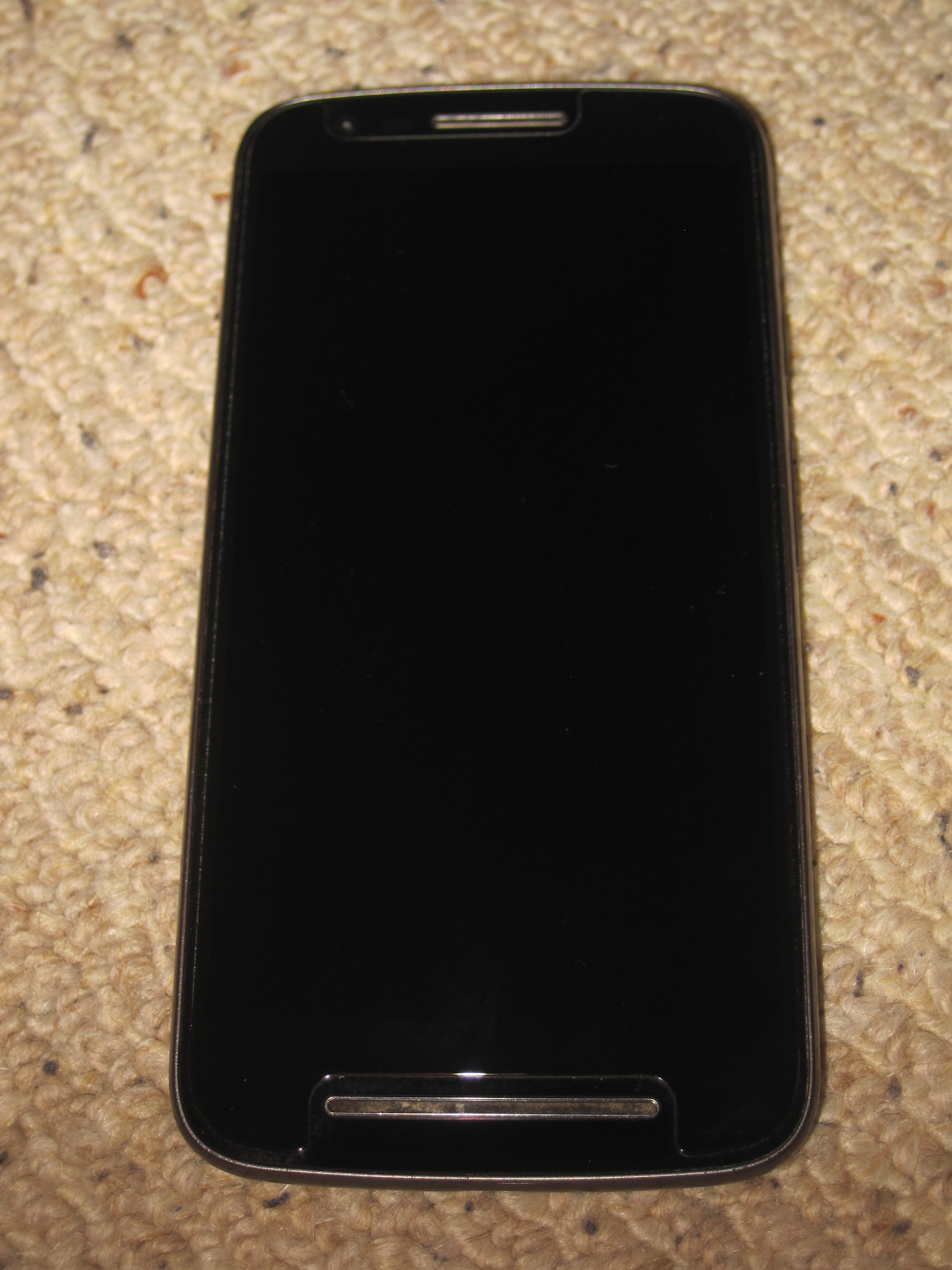
- Brand: Motorola
- Manufacturer: Motorola Mobility
- First released: E3 in July 2016, E3 Power in September 2016
- Predecessor: Moto E (2nd generation)
- Successor: Moto E4
- Operating system: Android 6.0 "Marshmallow"
- CPU: 1 GHz MediaTek MT6735P
- GPU: Mali T720 GPU
- Memory: 1GB RAM (E3) / 2 GB RAM (E3 Power)
- Storage: 8GB (E3) / 16 GB (E3 Power)
- Battery: Removable 2800 mAh (E3) / 3500 mAh (E3 Power)
- Rear camera: 8 MP
- Front camera: 5 MP
- Display: 5 inch 720x1280 IPS LCD
- Codename: Affinity

The Moto E3 (model XT1700) and the Moto E3 Power (model XT1706) are Android smartphones developed by Motorola Mobility, a subsidiary of Lenovo. These phones make up the third generation of the low-end Motorola Moto E series. The E3 was released in July 2016. The E3 Power was released through Flipkart in India in September 2016, and sold a record 100,000 units on its first day of sale.

The phones are available in black or white.

Their batteries are larger than average for their price point. The standard E3 uses the Motorola GK40 battery with 2800 mAh capacity, and the Power model uses the 3500 mAh GK50. A notable feature of the E3 Power is its support for rapid charging.

Both phones use the Mediatek MT6735P, a quad-core 1 GHz chipset. The display is a 720p IPS LCD with Corning Gorilla Glass 3 protection.

The Moto E3 and the Moto E3 Power run Android 6.0 Marshmallow. Motorola has stated that the phones will not receive the Android 7.0 Nougat update.

== Reception ==
Online reviews praised the Moto E3's excellent standby and screen-on time, with TechRadar stating it has "truly excellent stamina", thanks to its "undemanding" display. The E3 Power's battery life was also well-received. General performance on both models was widely criticised, however, due to the low-end processor - TechRadar's review calls screen navigation "far from fluid", and gaming performance "far from satisfactory".

The phones' design was praised, with reviewers noting the rarity of front-facing loudspeakers in smartphones. Trusted Reviews calls the Moto E3 "a good-looking phone".

The camera received mixed reviews. Trusted Reviews calls photos "very basic" and "a mess of white haze" in bright conditions, while TechRadar states camera performance is "surprisingly acceptable" and photos have "nicely balanced colors".

== Generation comparison ==
Motorola Moto E Series
| | 1st Gen (2014) | 2nd Gen (2015) | 3rd Gen (Standard/Power) (2016) |
|---|---|---|---|
| Internal storage | 4 GB | 8 GB | 8 GB (E3) / 16 GB (E3 Power) |
| Display | 4.3 inch | 4.5 inch (256 ppi) | 5.0 inch (294 ppi) |
| Processor | Snapdragon 200 | 4G - Snapdragon 410; 3G - Snapdragon 200 | 1.0 GHz MediaTek MT6735P |
| Memory | 1 GB | 1 GB | 1 GB (E3) / 2 GB (E3 Power) |
| Rear camera | 5 MP | 5 MP | 8 MP |
| Front camera | No | Yes, 0.3 MP | Yes, 5 MP |
| Flash | No | No | Yes |
| Quick launch camera | none | Double twist | Press power twice |
| Android version | 4.4 KitKat (at launch) | 5.0.2 Lollipop (at launch) | 6.0 Marshmallow |
| Removable battery | No, 1980 mAh | No, 2390 mAh | Yes, 2800 mAh / 3500 mAh |

All three generations use micro-SIMs and micro-USB B power connectors. Both models support OTG USB hosting.
