= Moto E20 =

Entry-level smartphone

Moto E20 Moto E30 Moto E40
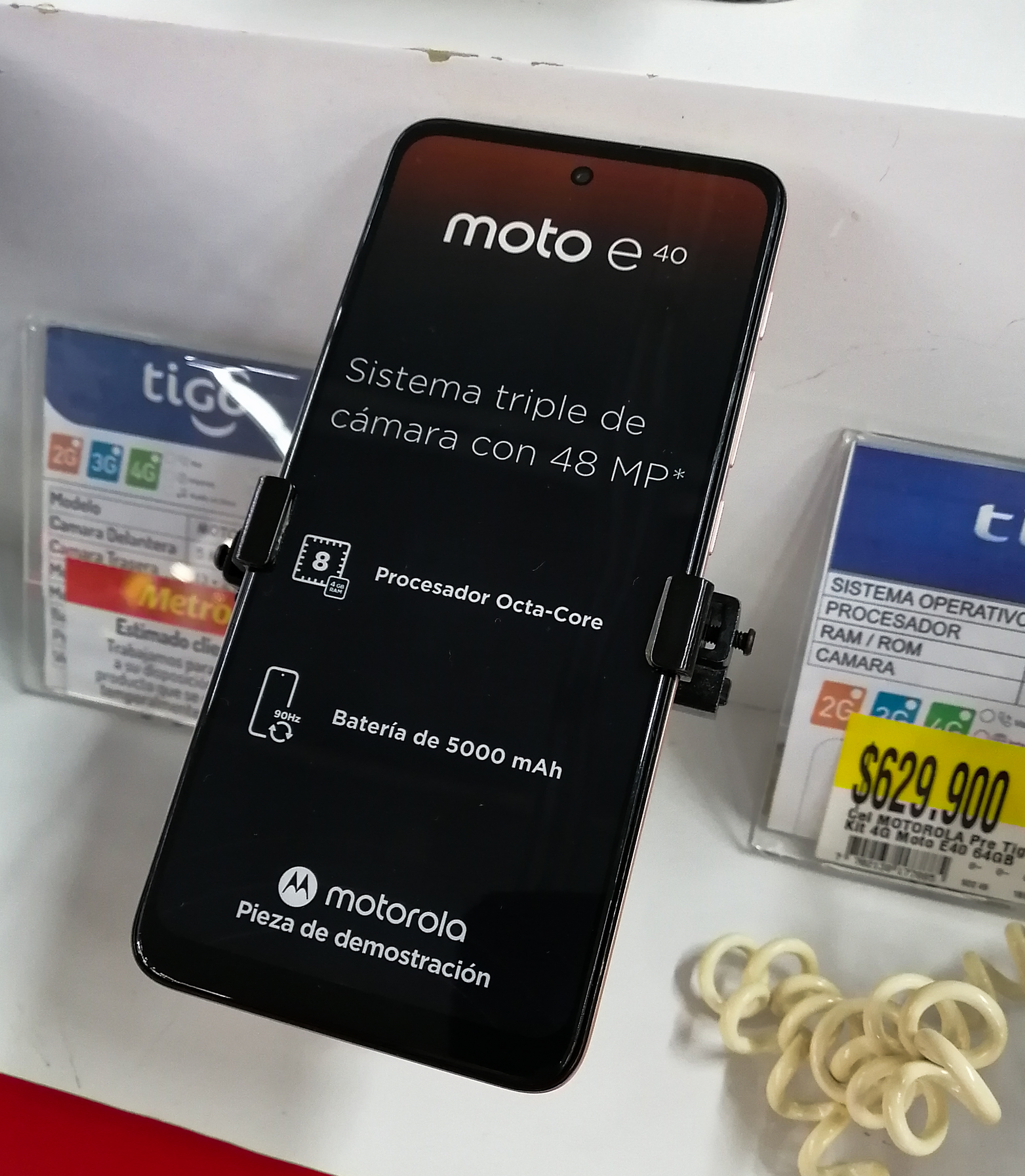
- Moto E40
- Brand: Motorola
- Manufacturer: Lenovo
- Type: Phablet
- Series: Moto E
- First released: E20: September 15, 2021; 4 years ago E40: October 7, 2021; 4 years ago E30: November 3, 2021; 4 years ago
- Predecessor: Moto E7
- Successor: Moto E12
- Related: Moto G10
- Compatible networks: GSM, 3G, 4G (LTE)
- Form factor: Slate
- Dimensions: E20: 164.8 × 75.5 × 8.5 mm E30/E40: 165.1 × 75.6 × 9.1 mm
- Weight: E20: 184 g E30 & E40: 198 g
- Operating system: E20/E30: Android 11 (Go Edition); E40: Android 11
- System-on-chip: E20: Unisoc T606 (12 nm); E30/E40: Unisoc T700 (12 nm)
- CPU: E20: Octa-core (2×1.6 GHz Cortex-A75 & 6×1.6 GHz Cortex-A55); E30/E40: Octa-core (2×1.82 GHz Cortex-A75 & 6×1.82 GHz Cortex-A55)
- GPU: E20: Mali-G57 MP1; E30/E40: Mali-G52
- Memory: E20: 2/3 GB; E30: 2 GB; E40: 4 GB; LPDDR4X
- Storage: E20 & E30: 32 GB; E40: 64 GB eMMC 5.1
- Removable storage: MicroSDXC up to 1 TB
- Battery: All models: Non-removable, Li-Po; E20: 4000 mAh; E30 & E40: 5000 mAh
- Charging: 10 W
- Rear camera: E20: 13 MP, f/2.2, 26 mm (wide), PDAF + 2 MP, f/2.4, (macro); E30: 48 MP, f/1.8, 26 mm, (wide), 1/2.0", 0.8 µm, PDAF + 2 MP, f/2.4, (macro) + 2 MP, f/2.4, (depth sensor); E40: 48 MP, f/2.0, 26 mm, (wide), PDAF + 2 MP, f/2.4, (macro) + 2 MP, f/2.4, (depth sensor); LED flash, HDR, panorama Video: 1080p@30fps
- Front camera: E20: 5 MP, f/2.2 E30/E40: 8 MP, f/2.0, 26 mm (wide), 1/4", 1.12 µm HDR; Video: 1080p@30fps
- Display: All models: IPS LCD, 6.5", 1600 × 720 (HD+), 20:9 aspect ratio, 270 ppi E20: 60 Hz; E30 & E40: 90 Hz
- Connectivity: USB-C 2.0, 3.5 mm Audio jack, Bluetooth 5.0 (A2DP, LE), FM radio, Wi-Fi 802.11 a (E30)/b/g/n (except E30) (hotspot), GPS, A-GPS, GLONASS (except E20), Galileo (except E20)
- Other: Fingerprint scanner (rear-mounted), Proximity sensor, accelerometer, water-repellent coating

The Moto E20, E30, and E40 are a line of entry-level Android smartphones developed, designed, and marketed by Motorola Mobility (a subsidiary of Lenovo) as part of the budget-friendly Moto E series. The E20 was released on October 7, 2021 for Spain alongside Moto E40, October 20, 2021 in the United Kingdom, and on March 31, 2022 in Germany.

The main differences between the Moto E30 and E40 are the reduced memory capacity and the lighter Go Edition software build on the E30.

== Design ==
The front panel of the devices is made of glass, while the outer body chassis is composed entirely of plastic.

The rear panel of the Moto E20 features a distinct hexagonal honeycomb pattern texture, whereas the Moto E30 and E40 feature a wavy, rippled texture design. All three devices come equipped with a water-repellent coating.

The bottom edge of each phone houses a USB-C port, the loudspeaker, and the primary microphone. The top edge retains a 3.5 mm headphone audio jack. On the left side, the Moto E20 features a hybrid slot supporting either dual Nano-SIM cards or a single Nano-SIM alongside a microSD card (up to 1 TB). The E30 and E40 feature either a single SIM + microSD setup or a dedicated triple slot (dual Nano-SIMs + microSD up to 1 TB) depending on regional models. The right side contains physical hardware keys, including a dedicated Google Assistant shortcut button, volume buttons, and the power button. A physical fingerprint scanner is located on the rear panel embedded within the classic Motorola batwing logo.

Color options for the devices include:

- Moto E20: Graphite Grey (gray) and Coastal Blue (blue).
- Moto E30: Mineral Grey and Digital Blue.
- Moto E40: Carbon Gray and Pink Clay.

== Specifications ==
=== Hardware and platform ===
The Moto E20 is powered by a Unisoc T606 system-on-chip coupled with a Mali-G57 MP1 graphics processing unit.

The Moto E30 and E40 both utilize the slightly faster Unisoc T700 processor paired with a Mali-G52 GPU.

=== Battery ===
The Moto E20 is equipped with a 4000 mAh battery, while the Moto E30 and E40 step up to a larger 5000 mAh capacity.

=== Cameras ===
The Moto E20 utilizes a dual rear camera system containing a 13 MP wide lens with a f/2.2 aperture and PDAF alongside a 2 MP macro lens with a f/2.4 aperture. Its front-facing camera uses a 5 MP sensor with a f/2.2 aperture.

The Moto E30 uses a triple camera array comprising a 48 MP wide main lens with a f/1.8 aperture and PDAF, a 2 MP macro lens with a f/2.4 aperture, and a 2 MP depth sensor with a f/2.4 aperture. The front camera uses an 8 MP sensor with a f/2.0 aperture.

The Moto E40 uses a similar triple camera setup, utilizing a 48 MP wide main lens with a f/2.0 aperture and PDAF, accompanied by a 2 MP macro lens with a f/2.4 aperture and a 2 MP depth sensor with a f/2.4 aperture. The front camera uses an 8 MP sensor with a f/2.0 aperture.

The rear and front camera setups on all three devices support video recording up to 1080p at 30fps.

=== Display ===
Every variant features a 6.5" IPS LCD screen with a HD+ resolution of 1600 × 720 pixels, an aspect ratio of 20:9, and a pixel density of 270 ppi. The Moto E20 display has a waterdrop notch cutout for the front-facing camera, while the E30 and E40 display use a centered punch-hole camera cutout. The Moto E20 is limited to a standard 60 Hz refresh rate, while the Moto E30 and E40 offer a smoother 90 Hz refresh rate.

=== Memory and storage ===
- Moto E20: Distributed in 2 GB or 3 GB of RAM configurations, both with 32 GB of internal storage.
- Moto E30: Available in a single configuration of 2 GB of RAM and 32 GB of storage.
- Moto E40: Available in a single configuration of 4 GB of RAM and 64 GB of storage.

=== Software ===
Both the Moto E20 and E30 ship with the stripped-down Android 11 (Go Edition), whereas the Moto E40 runs the standard full version of Android 11 out of the box.

== See also ==
- Moto G10
