= Moto E14 =

2024 smartphone model

Motorola Moto E14
- Brand: Motorola
- Manufacturer: Lenovo
- Series: Moto E series
- First released: June 17, 2024
- Predecessor: Moto E13
- Successor: Moto E15
- Compatible networks: GSM, HSPA, LTE
- Colors: Pastel Green, Graphite Gray, Pastel Purple
- Dimensions: 163.5×74.5×8 mm (6.44×2.93×0.31 in)
- Weight: 178.8 g (6.31 oz)
- Operating system: Android 14 (Go edition)
- System-on-chip: Unisoc T606 (12 nm)
- CPU: Octa-core (2x1.6 GHz Cortex-A75 & 6x1.6 GHz Cortex-A55)
- GPU: Mali-G57 MP1
- Memory: 2 GB or 4 GB RAM
- Storage: 64 GB UFS 2.2
- Removable storage: microSDXC
- Battery: 5,000 mAh Li-Po (non-removable)
- Charging: 15W wired
- Rear camera: 13 MP, f/2.2, (wide), PDAF, LED flash, HDR; 1080p@30fps video
- Front camera: 5 MP, f/2.2, (wide), HDR; 1080p@30fps video
- Display: 6.56 in (167 mm) IPS LCD, 90Hz, Corning Gorilla Glass 3; 720 × 1612 pixels, 20:9 ratio (~269 ppi density)
- Sound: Loudspeaker, 3.5 mm jack
- Connectivity: Wi-Fi 802.11 a/b/g/n/ac, dual-band Bluetooth 5.0, A2DP, LE; GPS, GALILEO, GLONASS; USB Type-C 2.0
- Water resistance: Water-repellent design
- Website: https://www.motorola.com/we/en/p/phones/moto-e/motorola-e14/pmipmhb38m2

The Moto E14, released on June 17, 2024, is an entry-level Android smartphone manufactured, designed, and marketed by Motorola Mobility, a subsidiary of Lenovo. Just like its predecessor, it shares the same processor, but lesser memory options.

== Design ==
The Motorola Moto E14 features a modern smartphone design characterized by a slim profile, measuring 163.5 mm in height, 74.5 mm in width, and 8 mm in thickness. The device carries a total weight of 178.8 grams, making it lightweight and highly portable for daily use. Its structural build consists of a Corning Gorilla Glass 3 front for scratch and impact resistance, paired with a durable plastic frame and a matching plastic rear panel. To protect against environmental hazards, the chassis features an IP52-certified water-repellent design that handles minor splashes and dust exposure.

The phone is offered in three distinct color finishes, which are marketed as Pastel Green, Graphite Gray, and Pastel Purple.

== Technical specifications ==
Performance is driven by an octa-core Unisoc T606 processor built on a 12-nanometer fabrication process, consisting of two Cortex-A75 cores and six Cortex-A55 cores clocked at 1.6 GHz. Graphics processing is handled by an integrated ARM Mali-G57 MP1 GPU. The internal memory configuration provides 64 GB of UFS 2.2 storage, which can be further expanded via a dedicated microSDXC card slot. The front of the device houses a 6.56-inch IPS LCD display that features a smooth 90 Hz refresh rate and a resolution of 720 x 1612 pixels at a 20:9 aspect ratio.

For photography and video, the Motorola Moto E14 utilizes a simplified single-camera configuration on both sides. The rear main camera consists of a 13-megapixel wide sensor with an f/2.2 aperture, phase detection autofocus, and an accompanying LED flash. The front selfie camera is positioned inside a modern punch-hole cutout and features a 5-megapixel sensor with an f/2.2 aperture. Both the front and rear camera modules support high-definition video recording up to 1080p at 30 frames per second. Powering the smartphone is a substantial 5000 mAh non-removable lithium-ion battery that supports wired charging speeds of up to 15 watts. In terms of audio and connectivity, the device includes a built-in loudspeaker enhanced by Dolby Atmos, a traditional 3.5 mm headphone jack, dual-band Wi-Fi 5, Bluetooth 5.0, and a USB Type-C 2.0 port.

Depending on the specific regional variant, the device comes equipped with either 2 GB or 4 GB of RAM and operates on the lightweight Android 14 Go edition operating system.

== Reception ==
PCMag reviewer Martyn Casserly noted that the device's color reproduction was generally vibrant, only occasionally exhibiting the over-saturation and sharpness typical of budget smartphones. Due to its single 13 MP ($f/2.2$) main camera, the phone lacks dedicated ultra-wide or optical zoom lenses; attempting to use the digital zoom results in significant pixelation. In low-light conditions, the e14 experienced autofocus difficulties. The system occasionally miscalculated the designated subject, resulting in softer images focused on alternative areas of the frame. While balanced low-light photography was achievable, reviewers noted that consistency remained unpredictable.
