= Moto E13 =

2023 Motorola smartphone manufactured by Lenovo

- Brand: Motorola
- Manufacturer: Lenovo
- Type: Phablet
- Series: Moto E
- First released: January 24, 2023; 3 years ago
- Predecessor: Moto E12
- Successor: Moto E14
- Related: Moto G13
- Compatible networks: GSM, 3G, 4G (LTE)
- Form factor: Slate
- Colors: Creamy White, Aurora Green, Cosmic Black
- Dimensions: 164.19×74.95×8.47 mm (6.464×2.951×0.333 in)
- Weight: 179.5 g (6 oz)
- Operating system: Android 13 (Go edition)
- System-on-chip: Unisoc T606 (12 nm)
- CPU: Octa-core (2×1.6 GHz Cortex-A75 & 6×1.6 GHz Cortex-A55)
- GPU: Mali-G57 MP1
- Memory: 2/4/8 GB; LPDDR4X
- Storage: 64/128 GB; eMMC 5.1
- Removable storage: microSDXC up to 1 TB
- Battery: Non-removable Li-Po 5000 mAh
- Charging: 10 W
- Rear camera: 13 MP, f/2.2 (wide), 1.12 µm, PDAF; LED flash, HDR, panorama Video: 1080p@30fps
- Front camera: 5 MP, f/2.4 (wide), 1/5", 1.12 µm HDR; Video: 1080p@30fps
- Display: IPS LCD, 6.5", 1600 × 720 (HD+), 20:9, 270 ppi
- Connectivity: USB-C 2.0, 3.5 mm jack, Bluetooth 5.0 (A2DP, LE), FM radio (recording), Wi-Fi 802.11 a/b/g/n/ac (dual-band, Wi-Fi Direct, hotspot), GPS, A-GPS, GLONASS, Galileo
- Other: Proximity sensor, accelerometer, IP52 dust and splash resistance
- Website: https://we.motorola.com/smartphones-moto-e-13/p?skuId=493

The Moto E13 is an entry-level smartphone developed by Mototola Mobility and manufactured by Lenovo, part of Moto E series. It was announced on January 24, 2023, along with Moto G13 and Moto G23.

The Moto E13 comes with an IP52-rating for resistance from splash and dust, but not waterproof. The camera application is slow to launch.

== Specifications ==
=== Display ===
The front panel is made of glass - it features an IPS LCD sizing at 6.5 inches with HD+ (1600 × 720; 20:9) with 270 ppi pixel density and a teardrop notch for the front camera.

=== Hardware ===
The Moto E13 is powered by the Unisoc T606 processor and the Mali-G57 MP1 graphics processor. It has a battery capacity of 5000 mAh.

The Moto E13 features a 13 MP wide-angle main camera (f/2.2) and a 5 MP wide-angle front camera (f/2.2). Both videos can record at a resolution of 1080p @ 30 fps. A reviewer noticed that despite taking pictures, the process is slow to complete.

The Moto E13 is sold in 64 GB or 128 GB of internal memory and 2 GB, 4 GB, and 8 GB of RAM.

=== Software ===
The Moto E13 was released on Android 13 Go Edition.
