= Moto E22 =

Moto E22 Moto E22s Moto E22i Moto E32 Moto E32s
- Brand: Motorola
- Manufacturer: Lenovo
- Type: Phablet
- Series: Moto E
- First released: E32: May 5, 2022; 4 years ago E32s: May 13, 2022; 4 years ago E22s: August 24, 2022; 3 years ago E22/E22i: September 16, 2022; 3 years ago E32 (India): October 5, 2022; 3 years ago
- Predecessor: Moto E10
- Successor: Moto E13
- Related: Moto G12
- Compatible networks: GSM, 3G, 4G (LTE)
- Form factor: Slate
- Dimensions: E22/E22i: 163.6 × 74.7 × 8 mm E22s/E32/E32s: 164 × 75 × 8.5 mm
- Weight: E22/E22i: 169 g E22s/E32 (India)/E32s: 185 g E32: 184 g
- Operating system: E22/E22s/E32 (India): Android 12; E22i: Android 12 (Go Edition); E32/E32s: Android 11
- CPU: E22/E22i/E22s/E32 (India)/E32s: MediaTek MT6765V/CB Helio G37 (12 nm), octa-core (4×2.3 GHz Cortex-A53 & 4×1.8 GHz Cortex-A53); E32: Unisoc T606 (12 nm), octa-core (2×1.6 GHz Cortex-A75 & 6×1.6 GHz Cortex-A55)
- GPU: E22/E22i/E22s/E32 (India)/E32s: PowerVR 8320; E32: Mali-G57 MP1
- Memory: E22/E32s: 3/4 GB; E22i: 2 GB; E22s/E32: 4 GB; LPDDR4X
- Storage: E22/E32s: 32/64 GB; E22i: 32 GB; E22s/E32: 64 GB eMMC 5.1
- Removable storage: microSDXC up to 1 TB
- Battery: All models: non-removable, Li-Po; E22/E22i: 4020 mAh; E22s/E32/E32s: 5000 mAh
- Charging: E22/E22i/E22s/E32 (India): 10 W E32: 18 W E32s: 15 W
- Rear camera: E22/E22i/E22s: 16 MP, f/2.2, 26 mm (wide), 1.0 µm, PDAF + 2 MP, f/2.4, (depth sensor); E32/E32s: 16 MP, f/2.2, 26 mm (wide), 1.0 µm, PDAF + 2 MP, f/2.4, (macro) + 2 MP, f/2.4, (depth sensor); E32 (India): 50 MP, f/1.8, 26 mm, (wide), 0.64 µm, PDAF + 2 MP, f/2.4, (depth sensor); LED flash, HDR, panorama Video: 1080p@30fps
- Front camera: E22/E22i: 5 MP, f/2.4, 1/5", 1.12 µm E22s/E32/E32s: 8 MP, f/2.2, 26 mm (wide), 1/4", 1.12 µm HDR; Video: 1080p@30fps
- Display: IPS LCD, 6.5", 1600 × 720 (HD+), 20:9, 270 ppi, 90 Hz
- Connectivity: USB-C 2.0, 3.5 mm Audio jack, Bluetooth 5.0 (A2DP, LE), FM radio, NFC (E22 3/32 GB), Wi-Fi 802.11 a (except E32)/b/g/n/ac (except E32) (dual-band (except E32), Wi-Fi Direct (E32), hotspot), GPS, A-GPS, GLONASS, Galileo
- Data inputs: Side-mounted fingerprint scanner, Proximity sensor, accelerometer, water-repellent coating

The Moto E22 (originally referenced as Moto E12 line) is a series of entry-level smartphones developed by Motorola Mobility, a subsidiary of Lenovo, forming part of the Moto E series. The line consists of two main models: the Moto E22 and Moto E32, alongside several variants, including the Moto E22i and Moto E22s for the E22, and the Moto E32s for the E32.

In September 2022, information regarding Motorola's upcoming budget smartphones, the Moto E22 and E22i, surfaced through regulatory certification listings and media leaks. Prior to the official announcement, publication Pricebaba released leaked product renders and reported an anticipated launch date of September 16, 2022, for both models.

The Indian variant of the Moto E32 is nearly identical to the Moto E22s, differing primarily in its rear camera module configuration.

== Design ==
The front display is made of glass, while the back panel and chassis frames are constructed from plastic.

In terms of design, the Moto E32 and E32s are identical and look very similar to the Moto G22. The Moto E22s and the Indian Moto E32 share a similar aesthetic to the global Moto E32 and E32s, but feature only two rear cameras that are not integrated into a singular camera bump module. The Moto E22 and E22i feature a design reminiscent of the Motorola Edge 30 Neo.

The bottom houses a USB-C port, a speaker, and a microphone. A 3.5 mm audio jack is located on the top edge. The left side contains a card slot: the Moto E22, E22i, E22s, and Indian E32 use a dedicated dual SIM card slot with a separate microSD slot supporting up to 1 TB, while the global E32 and E32s feature a hybrid dual SIM slot configuration (allowing either two SIM cards or one SIM card and one microSD card up to 1 TB). The right side features the volume rocker and a power lock button integrated with a capacitive fingerprint scanner.

Color options available for each model include:

- Moto E22: Astro Black and Crystal Blue.
- Moto E22i: Graphite Gray and Winter White.
- Moto E22s and Moto E32 (India): Iceberg Blue and Cosmic Black.
- Moto E32: Slate Grey, Misty Silver, and Pearl Blue.
- Moto E32s: Slate Grey and Misty Silver.

== Specifications ==
=== Platform ===
The Moto E22, its variants, the Indian Moto E32, and the Moto E32s are powered by a MediaTek Helio G37 processor paired with a PowerVR 8320 GPU.

The global version of the Moto E32 utilizes a Unisoc T606 processor alongside a Mali-G57 MP1 GPU.

=== Battery ===
The Moto E22 and E22i come equipped with a 4020 mAh battery, while all other models feature a larger 5000 mAh capacity. The global version of the Moto E32 supports 18 W fast charging, whereas the E32s supports up to 15 W charging.

=== Cameras ===
All Moto E22 variants feature a dual rear camera setup consisting of a 16 MP main shooter with an f/2.2 aperture (wide) featuring Phase Detection Autofocus (PDAF) and a 2 MP depth sensor with an f/2.4 aperture.

The Moto E32 and E32s feature a triple rear camera setup: a 16 MP wide lens (f/2.2, PDAF), a 2 MP macro lens (f/2.4), and a 2 MP depth sensor (f/2.4).

The Indian variant of the Moto E32 updates the primary sensor to a dual setup with a 50 MP wide lens (f/1.8, PDAF) accompanied by a 2 MP depth sensor (f/2.4).

Front-facing cameras differ across the lineup: Moto E22 variants feature a 5 MP sensor (f/2.2), while Moto E32 variants carry an 8 MP sensor (f/2.0). Both front and rear setups across all devices support video capture up to 1080p at 30fps.

=== Display ===
The devices share a 6.5-inch IPS LCD display with a HD+ resolution (1600 × 720), a pixel density of 270 ppi, a 20:9 aspect ratio, and a 90 Hz refresh rate. The Moto E22 and E22i employ a waterdrop notch design for the front camera, while the other models utilize a centered punch-hole cut-out.

=== Audio ===
The Moto E22 and E22i are built with dual stereo speakers where the earpiece acts as the secondary channel. All other models utilize a single bottom-firing multimedia loudspeaker.

=== Memory ===
Storage configurations available across models include:

- Moto E22: 3/32 GB or 4/64 GB.
- Moto E22i: 2/32 GB.
- Moto E22s and Moto E32: 4/64 GB.
- Moto E32s: 3/32 GB, 3/64 GB, or 4/64 GB.

=== Software ===
The Moto E32 and E32s shipped out-of-the-box with Android 11. The Moto E22, E22s, and Indian Moto E32 released with Android 12, while the Moto E22i ran Android 12 (Go Edition).

== Incident ==
An incident in Brazil involved a Moto E32 handset exploding while stored in a user's back pocket. The resulting fire caused second- and third-degree burns, requiring immediate hospitalization.
