= Motorola V phone =

Cell phone released by Motorola in 1998

Motorola V Series (v50/998/3620/3682/3688/8160/8162)
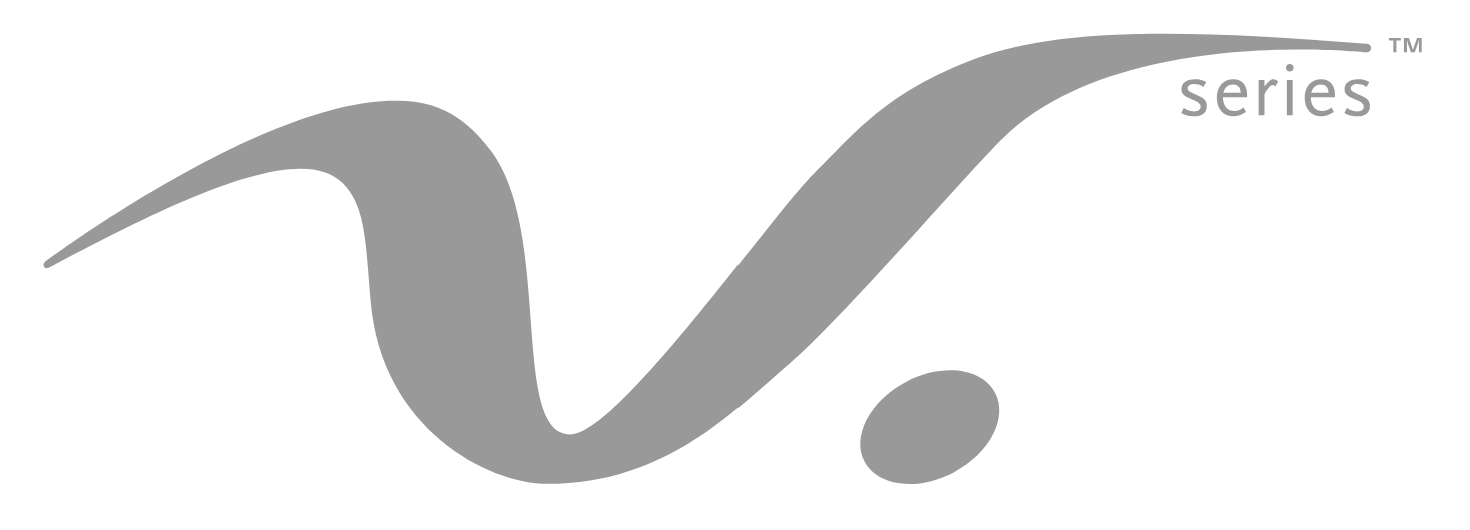

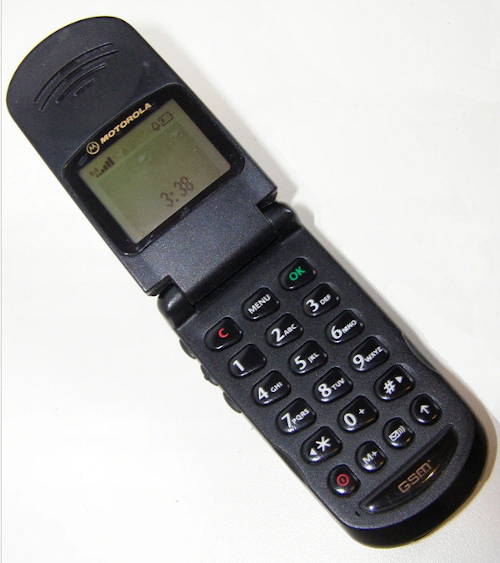
- Motorola V3688
- Also known as: Vader; Wings
- Brand: Motorola V
- Developer: Albert Nagele
- Manufacturer: Motorola
- Type: Mobile phone
- Series: V. Series
- First released: v3620: October 1998; 28 years ago v3688: February 1999 v3682: July 2000 v8160: July 2000 v50: October 2000
- Predecessor: Motorola StarTAC
- Successor: Motorola V60; Motorola Razr
- Form factor: Clamshell
- Dimensions: 83 mm (3.3 in) H (folded); 44 mm (1.7 in) W 25 mm (0.98 in) D
- Weight: 82 g (2.9 oz) or 83 g (2.9 oz)
- Display: 96 x 64 px LCD (digital models); LED (V3620)
- Data inputs: Keypad

The Motorola V series is a lineup of compact flip phones designed by Motorola as a successor of the StarTAC line. It was originally released in October 1998 as v3620 on the analog AMPS network in North America, followed by a digital GSM release in other territories as v3688 or v998 (China) in early 1999. Based on a clamshell design like the StarTAC series, its body is 25% narrower by comparison and at 2.7 ounces was the lightest and smallest cell phone at the time. Because of its physical characteristics, it became highly popular for being fashionable.

In 2000, a GSM variant for the North American market was released as the v3682, while a cdmaOne variant was released there as v8160/v8162 ("Vulcan"). The original V phone was succeeded by two updated versions: first the v3690 then the v50, before they were majorly succeeded by Motorola V66 and the flagship Motorola V60 in 2001.

== Name ==
Officially the V Series (later stylized to V. series), both the analog V3620 and digital V3688 were also called by the media and individuals as simply the "V phone", and had initially also been affectionally referred to by some as the "Mini StarTAC" or "Baby StarTAC". It was also referred to as the "Vader", which was the development code name for the V3620 model. This nickname has also been used collectively for the V3688 and all other similar models afterwards, as they all look almost the same from a distance. In Italian the V phone was also nicknamed "dattero", the word for dates.

Motorola also marketed the 2001 V60 and V66, and candybars like the V120 and V2260 as the 'V series', intended to be a series for stylish handsets. With the Motorola V600 in 2003 the old V series ended and a new wide range of V-prefix clamshell handsets were released, although not named 'series', and some of which morphed into new lines such as the Razr or Pebl.

== History ==
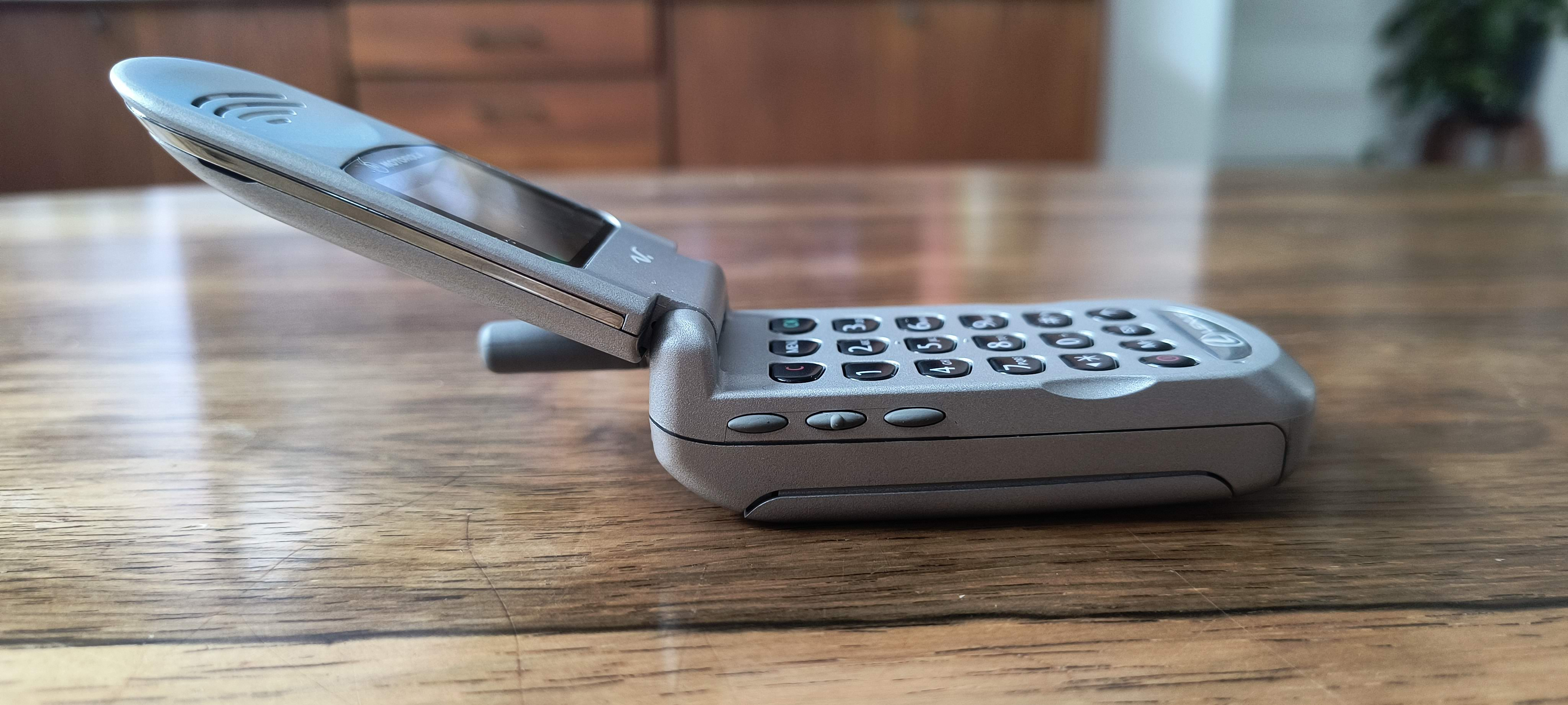
Side view of the V phone (model v50 shown)

The V Series was announced in July 1998 and were the first Motorola cell phone products designated with the V prefix. Up until this point, flip phones were still a rarity other than Motorola's own StarTAC series. Motorola's V phone further popularized the form factor across the industry going into the new century. It also came out during a time when miniaturization was trendy in the industry. The V phone was the first clamshell phone in the west with the conventional flip phone design of a display in the top part and keypad in the bottom part. However, Motorola had already designed such a device and in this small light body for the PHS network in Japan, released in January 1998, from which the V3620 and V3688 borrowed the concept from.

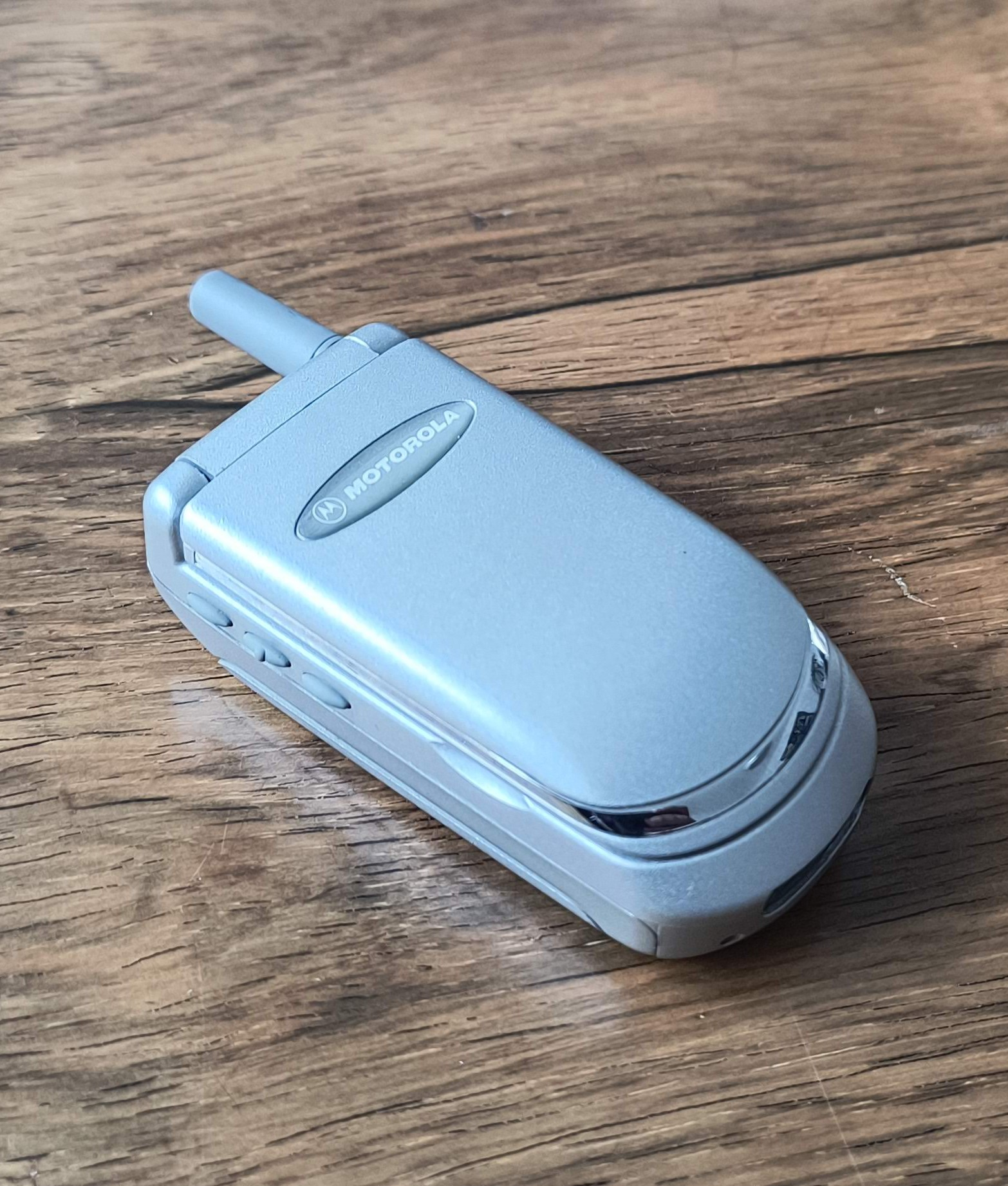
While folded, showing its small size

Motorola V3620 debuted in October and November of 1998 sold for approximately $600 on contract or between $900 and $1200 without. The phone attracted considerable attention in American media because of its compact size. In a press release about the phone, Motorola named several famous actors who were actively using the V series phone, with Jennifer Aniston and Brett Ratner among the names listed. In a Rolling Stone interview of the Wu-Tang Clan in fall 1998, Cappadonna is mentioned as using the V series phone and the author compared its size (when folded) to a "pack of Bubble Yum" while Cappadonna himself praised the size, comfort and cell reception.

The Motorola V3688, which is the digital GSM (900/1800) model, was released at the beginning of 1999 in Europe and some Asian territories, and was presented at the CeBIT expo. Motorola once again stated in a press release its use by celebrities, for example naming here Liz Hurley. The V3688 was also sold in China as the V998. Motorola V3682 was the long-delayed GSM 1800 specific model for American markets. Expected to have come out at the beginning of 1999, it did not release to market until the summer of 2000, initially carried by Cingular and Pacific Bell Wireless.

== V3690 ==
An updated version of the V3688 was released as Motorola V3690 in early 2000 for GSM networks. It adds a memo function and voice command similar to the Timeport models L7089 and P7389.

== V8160/V8162 ==
For more than a year, the V phone was only available for analog networks in North America until the introduction of the Motorola V8160, codenamed and also nicknamed Vulcan. It also had some software differences over the previous GSM models. The V8160 was released in May 2000 and runs on CDMA 800 and also works with AMPS. The Motorola V8162 is a model for Sprint PCS, designed to be used on CDMA 1900. The NY Post mentioned a number of famous celebrities who were using the V8160 V phone, again cementing its symbolic status in popular culture.

== V50 ==
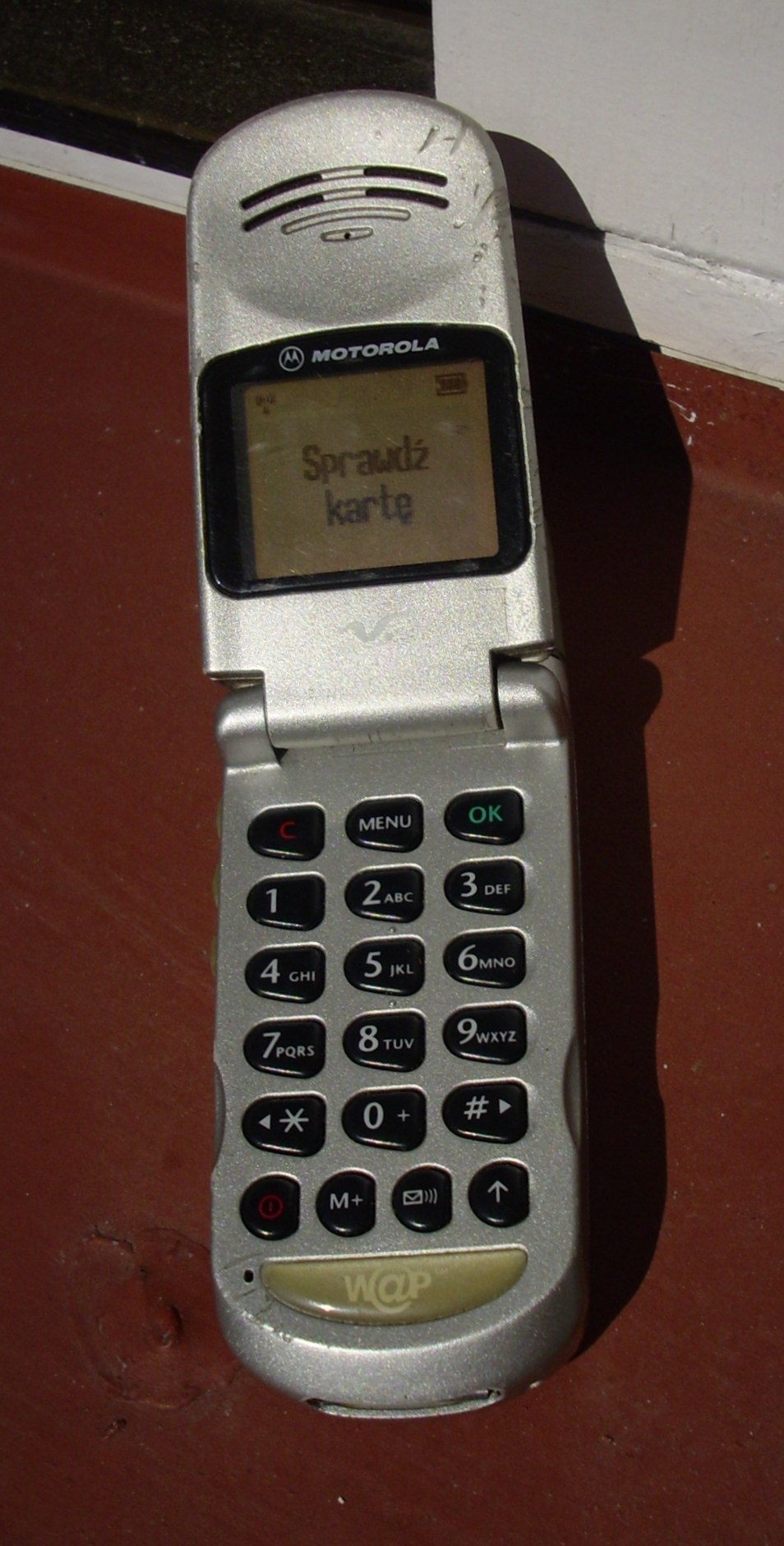
V50

The Motorola v50 follows the v3690 as a second and more major upgrade to the original GSM v3688. Sold mainly in a silver/gray color, the v50 has improved software with a scrolling menu, predictive text, alarm, a ring composer, games, and the existing voice features added in the v3690. It also has an additional WAP mini browser. This handset was released in late 2000 and early 2001 in other territories. The V50 achieved popularity in the Chinese market, where it was known as v998+. The Chinese market also received another variant in 2003, model v998c.

== In popular culture ==
The original V phone appeared in the 2001 film Ocean's Eleven used by Brad Pitt's character.

The V 3682 is in the collection of the Museum of Modern Art in New York. It was also included in the museum's 2025 exhibition, Pirouette: Turning Points in Design, featuring "widely recognized design icons [...] highlighting pivotal moments in design history," such as the Bean Bag chair, the Sony Walkman portable cassette player, and the NASA Worm insignia.

== V. series phones ==
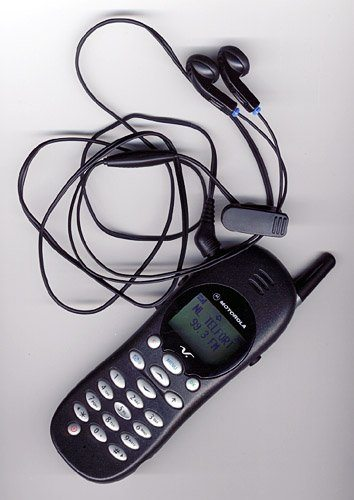
Motorola V. Series 2288 candybar with its headset

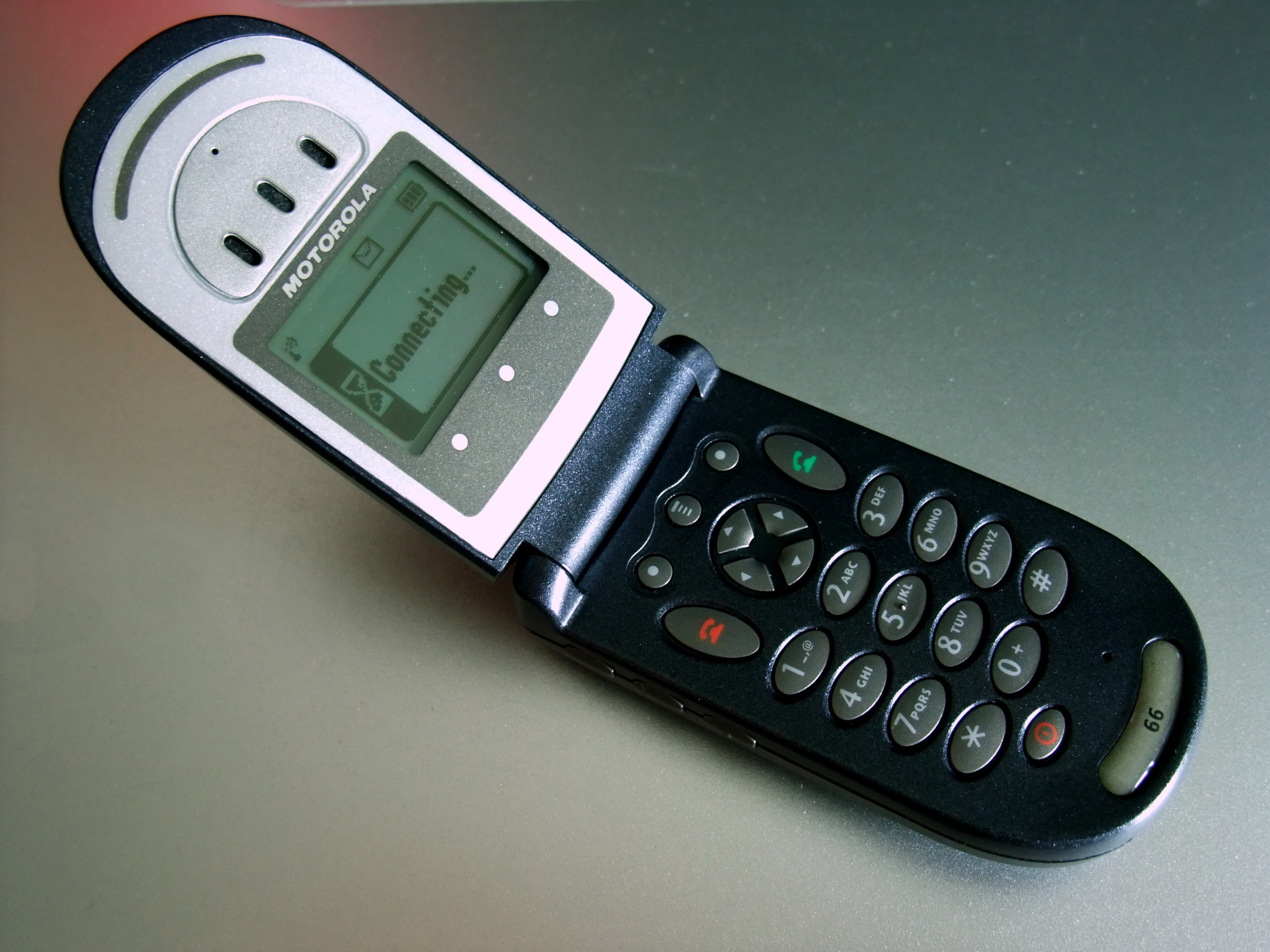
Motorola V. Series 66 flip phone

After the original V phone phone debuted, Motorola trademarked the stylized V.series (or V. Series) name and later released a number of completely new style-oriented phones using this brand:

- v8088, a clamshell phone with a revised tapered design, different display and keypad, exterior LED light, and a WAP mini browser. It was released in Asia and Australia and sold for S$998 while in Europe it was known as the v51. A successor was released, V150, in 2003 as an entry-level product sharing near-identical specs with the C350.
- v22xx, youth-oriented candybar phones with features such as WAP and an FM Radio introduced in mid 2000. These peanut-shaped phones were designed to be more stylish than Motorola's other candybars (in the 'd' series, 'Talkabout' series or the executive 'Timeport' series), and were sold as v2260, v2267, v2282, v2288, v2290, v2297 and v2397. This "peanut" shape continued in the phone's successor, Motorola C330, released in 2002.
- v20xx, youth-oriented candybar phones with a more conventional shape and less features than the v22xx, sold as the v2088.
- v100, also marketed as V.Box, a youth-oriented palmtop-style communicator with a QWERTY keyboard announced in November 2000.
- v120, candybar phone with WAP and FM radio, released in 2001 as v120c (CDMA) or v120t (TDMA).
- v60, flagship clamshell phone released in 2001.
- v66, clamshell phone released in 2001.

Later products with the V-prefix (such as Motorola V70) were not marketed under the V.series brand.

== Specifications ==
	V3620	V3688	V3682	V8160	V8162	V50
Pre-release codename	Vader	Kramer, StarTAC 210		Vulcan		
Modes	AMPS 800	GSM 900 / GSM 1800		CDMA 800	CDMA 1900	GSM 900 / 1800
Weight	2.7 oz (82 g)	2.9 oz (83 g)				
Dimensions	3.43" x 1.80" x 0.93" (83 x 44 x 25 mm)	3.43" x 1.80" x 0.93" (83 x 44 x 25 mm)				
Form Factor	Clamshell Stub Antenna	Clamshell Stub Antenna				
Battery Life	Talk: 110 minutes or 3 hours with dual battery Standby: 46 hours	Talk: 3.33 hours (200 minutes) Standby: 140 hours (5.8 days)				
Battery Type		Standard, 500mAh Li-Ion (packaged battery)				
Display	Monochrome LED, 2 lines (7 characters per line)	Type: Monochrome graphic, Optimax Size: 96 x 64 pixels, 5 lines				
Memory	99 entries	100 entries				
Phone Book Capacity		250 SIM card only				
High-Speed Data		14.4k				
Text Messaging	Cellular Messaging Service compatible	SMS				
Multiple Languages	3	26				
Available Colors		black, galaxy gray, light titanium, and radar blue				
Available Accessories		Replacement battery, car charger				

== See also ==
- List of Motorola V series phones
- Ericsson T28s
- Nokia 8210
- Samsung A100
