= Motorola T720 =

Cell phone released in 2002

Motorola T720/T720i/T721/T725/T730
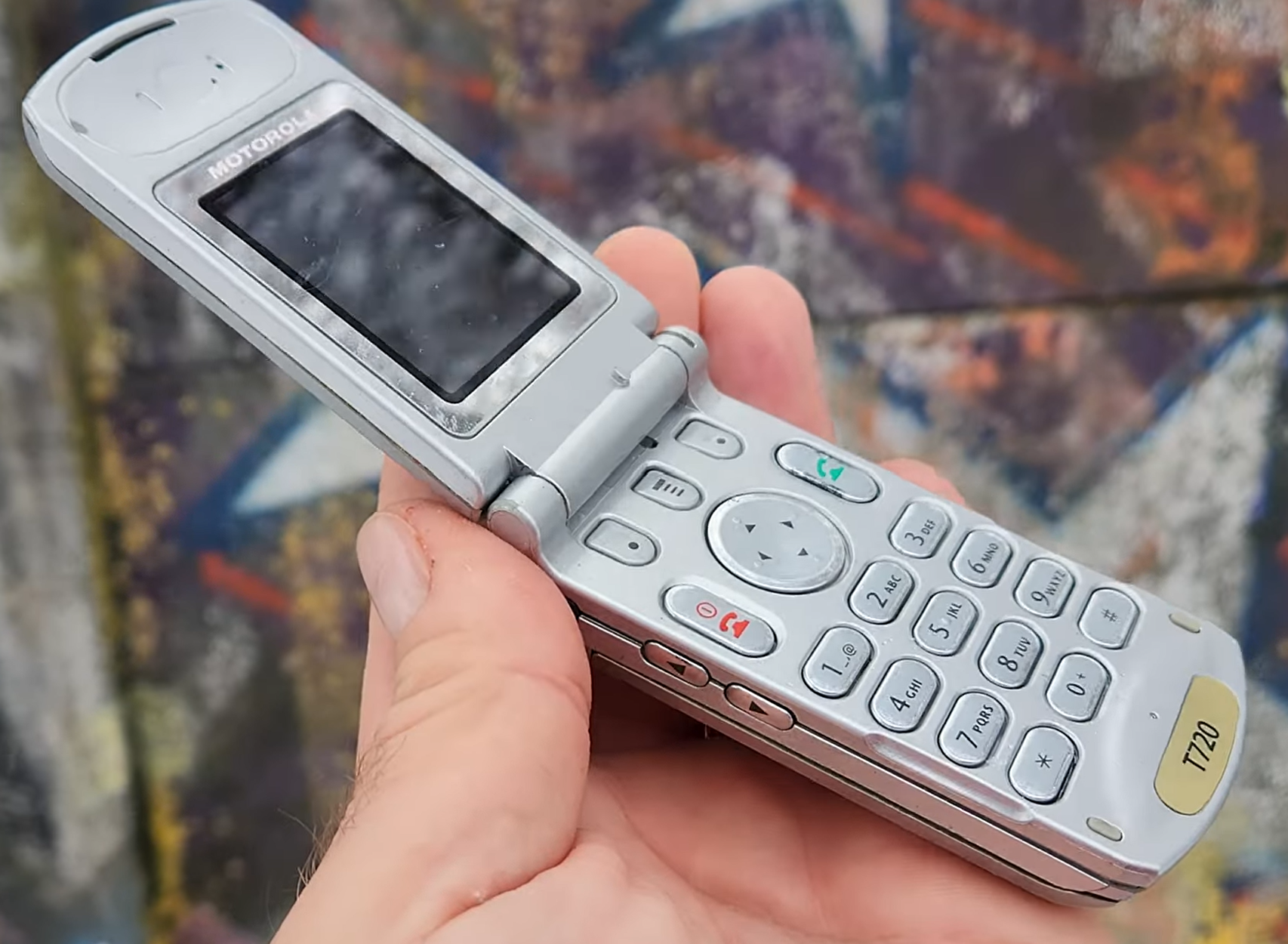
- Developer: Motorola
- Type: Mobile phone
- First released: September 2002; 23 years ago
- Successor: Motorola V500 (T720/T720i/T721); Motorola V551 (T725); Motorola V710 (T730)
- Form factor: Clamshell
- Dimensions: 90 mm (3.5 in) H (folded); 47 mm (1.9 in) W 21 mm (0.83 in) D
- Weight: 100 g (3.5 oz)
- Display: CSTN 4:3 ratio
- External display: Yes
- Data inputs: Keypad

The Motorola T720 is a clamshell mobile phone developed by Motorola, announced on February 14, 2002 in Milan. It is a "T"-prefix product, although was not marketed under the Timeport or Talkabout brands and there would be no more handsets under this designation after the T720 line. The Motorola T720 was the company's first regular cell phone that had a color display, when excluding Motorola's Accompli 009 communicator. It was released in GSM and CDMA variants.

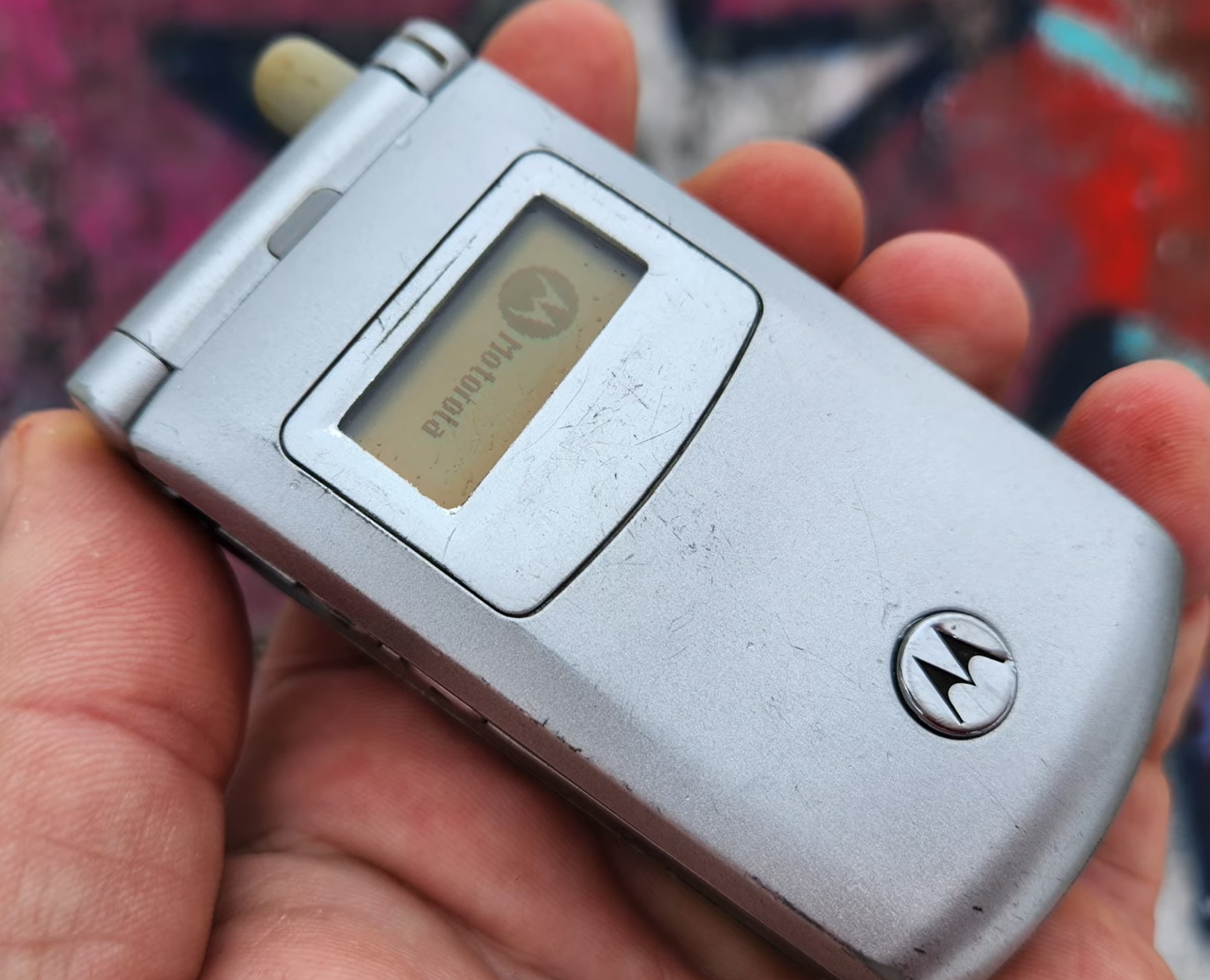
Exterior showing the second display

The Motorola T720 was developed on the back of the success of the Motorola V60 and the growing trend and adoption for color. The controls are generally similar to the V60 and V66. Its most notable feature is the color display: it is a CSTN display producing 4096 colors and passive matrix. This was however not technically as good as the competing Samsung T100 that featured an active matrix display. The Motorola T720 also had a much improved (over the V60) external display, with a resolution of 96x32 pixels, up from 96x16 pixels.

Described as a cross between the Motorola V60 and Motorola StarTAC, the Motorola T720's silver body is slightly larger than V60 and it also has bigger buttons with backlighting, and larger display, including a larger external display. As part of the color display, Motorola also designed a new user interface menu that would be used on many of their future feature phones for several years. Key features include GPRS, a WAP browser, EMS (5.0), and polyphonic ringtones, and an email client supporting POP3 and IMAP protocols. It does not have MMS, however. The T720 sold by Verizon Wireless ran BREW and could download ringtones and games using Verizon's Get It Now service.

== Release and versions ==
The release of the T720 (alongside the entry-level Motorola C330) was critically delayed, as it was initially expected in early Q3 of 2002. This played a part in hitting Motorola's profits. The phone was released in the US on September 20, 2002 carried by Verizon Wireless then on October 14, 2002 carried by AT&T. AT&T also later sold a software improved version with the model number T721.

On November 7, 2002, T-Mobile US announced the Motorola T720i as an exclusive which adds MMS capability and is compatible with a camera accessory. It was T-Mobile's first camera phones along with Sony Ericsson T300. This model was also released in other countries.

Motorola T725 is a variant of the GSM version that supports faster EDGE data. It was announced in January 2003.

The Motorola T730 is an improved CDMA version released by Verizon with 1xRTT data.

== In popular culture ==
A Motorola T720i briefly appears as being used by Woody Harrelson's character in the drama True Detective.

== See also ==
- Motorola V600
- List of Motorola products
