= Motorola Razr Maxx =

Motorola mobile phone released in 2006-2007

Motorola Razr maxx
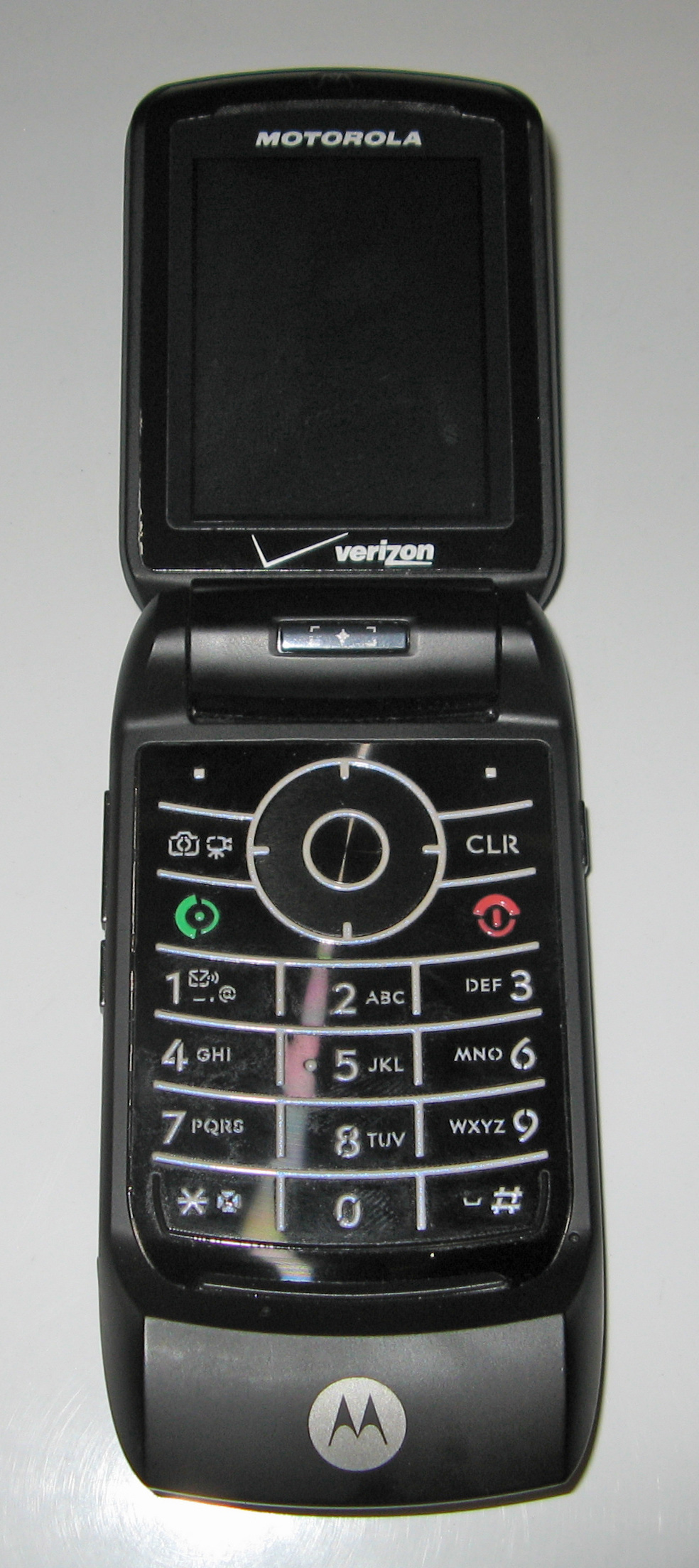
- Manufacturer: Motorola
- Availability by region: US: April 24, 2007
- Compatible networks: maxx V6:GSM 900/1800/1900 MHz, UMTS 2100 with HSDPA maxx Ve:CDMA2000 1x 800/1900 MHz with EV-DO
- Form factor: Clamshell
- Dimensions: 53×104.5×15.5 mm (2.09×4.11×0.61 in)
- Weight: 107 g (4 oz)
- GPU: NVIDIA GoForce 4800 GPU Processor
- Memory: 50 MB
- Battery: 880 mAh (For United States), 900 mAh (For Europe, Australia and Asia markets)
- Rear camera: 2 Megapixels 1600x1200 (maxx Ve has Auto Focus)
- Front camera: 0.3 Megapixels (VGA) used for video calling (maxx Ve is not supported)
- Display: QVGA, 2.2 inch, 262,144 Colors, 320x240
- External display: 120x160, 65,536 Colors
- Connectivity: Mini USB 2.0, Bluetooth 2.0 + EDR
- Other: External touch music controls Ringtones: Polyphonic, MP3

Motorola Razr Maxx V6 (stylized Motorola RAZR maxx V6), also released as simply Motorola Razr Maxx, is a clamshell mobile phone released by Motorola, announced in July 2006 as part of the RAZR series. It features major improvements to the RAZR V3i/V3x released in 2006, with HSDPA 3.5G connectivity, 2.0-megapixel camera with LED flash, a 2.2-inch (56 mm) screen with 240x320 QVGA display and 50 megabytes of internal storage.

Released at the end of 2006 in Europe and on April 27, 2007, in the US, the RAZR maxx is slightly thicker and wider than the V3 series but has similarly thin profile as opposed to the preceding 3G model, RAZR V3x; its dimensions are nearly identical to the V3xx, a model announced at the same time as the maxx. It has a glass fascia with external touch-sensitive controls for MP3s, a feature that appeared on the KRZR K1, and a soft-touch rubberized finish similar to that on the PEBL U6.

== Specifications ==
- HSDPA (3.5G) and EDGE
- SMS, EMS, MMS
- 50 MB of Memory
- Bluetooth 2.0 + EDR, mini USB 2.0
- Expandable memory card slot (microSD, up to 2 GB)
- Video calling at 15 frames per second
- NVIDIA GoForce 4800 GPU Processor
- 2.2 inch TFT LCD up to 262,144 colors
- 2.0 megapixels camera with LED flash, Maxx Ve version supports Auto-focus

== Release and variants ==
This handset was released on Telstra's NextG network under the original name "Motorola Razr maxx V6". It was compatible with both the original 2100 MHz band and the NextG band, 850 MHz. It was branded with the Telstra logo and on-screen graphics and was released by Telstra for outright purchase in late 2006 at a price of about A$800. The phone was repackaged late in 2007 and sold with a prepaid plan for $250, locked for use only with Telstra SIM cards. Many of the post-paid phones sold by Telstra in 2007 were inadvertently locked.

The RAZR maxx Ve is the Verizon Wireless exclusive variant in the United States designed to work on EV-DO instead of HSDPA and CDMA2000 1x instead of GSM/UMTS. The Verizon Wireless version became available on April 24, 2007. It did not feature a second camera on the inside of the phone; instead, there was a shutter button for focusing and picture taking.
