= Motorola Razr V3 =

Motorola mobile phone model

Motorola RAZR V3
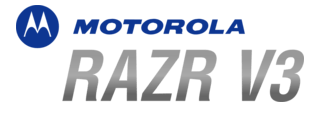

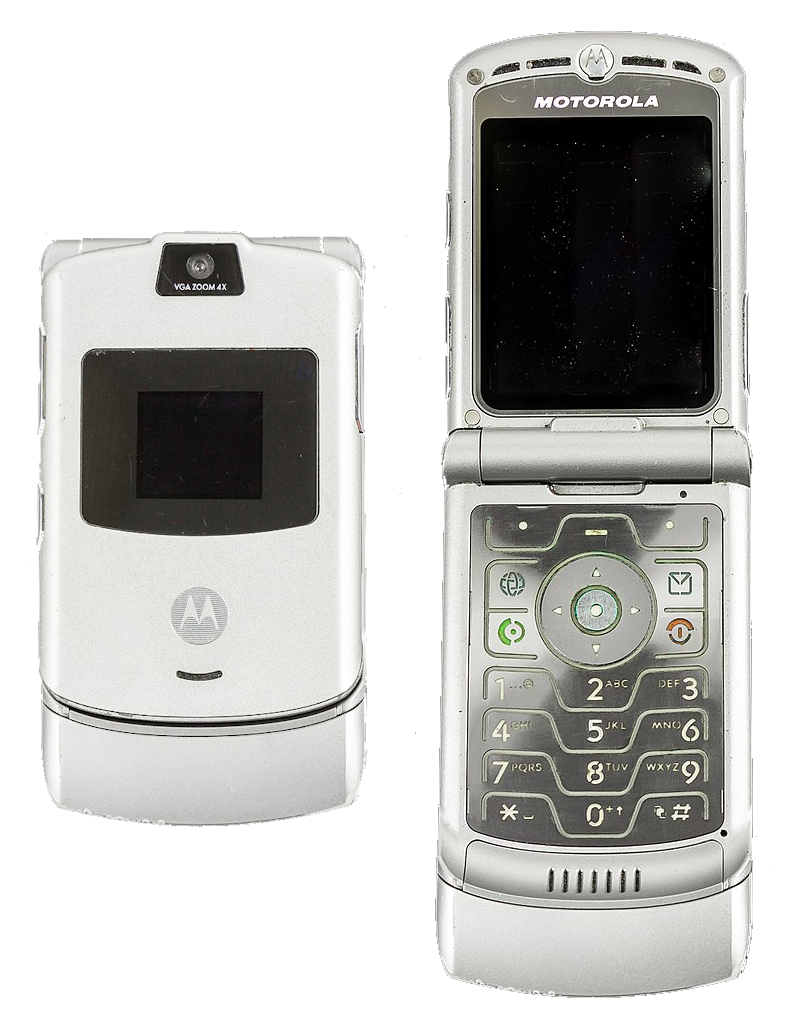
- The RAZR V3 in its original silver color, in folded (left) and unfolded (right)
- Also known as: Motorola V3; Moto Razr V3; MOTORAZR
- Developer: Motorola
- Series: RAZR
- First released: US: November 16, 2004
- Discontinued: 2008
- Units sold: 130 million
- Units shipped: 4.7 million
- Predecessor: Motorola V600
- Successor: Motorola Razr2; Motorola Razr (2020) (spiritual)
- Related: MOTOSLVR L7; MOTOKRZR K1; MOTORAZR maxx V6
- Compatible networks: GSM; CDMA (variants)
- Dimensions: 2.1 × 3.9 × 0.54 inches (53 × 98 × 13 mm)
- Weight: 3.35 oz (95 g); 3.5 oz (99 g) (V3i model)
- Memory: 5.6 MB
- Display: 176×220 pixel (2.2inch) TFT LCD, 262,144 colors
- External display: 96×80 pixel CSTN 65,536 colors
- Connectivity: GPRS class 10; EDGE (variants); EV-DO (variants); Bluetooth v1.2 mini-USB
- Made in: China

The Motorola Razr V3, popularly called simply the Razr (pronounced /ˈreɪzər/ like "razor"), is a flip phone developed by Motorola. A 2G quad-band worldwide GSM phone, it was released initially in September 2004, and in the US in November 2004, being the first product released under the RAZR (or MOTORAZR) moniker. Updated versions were later released as V3i, V3x and V3xx which included changes such as improved cameras, expandable memory, or 3G, and variants were released to support other networks.

The Razr V3's internal specifications were almost identical to the preceding Motorola V600 and V500 series, but it was built in a completely new, skinny body. Codenamed "Siliqua", Motorola began development in July 2003, in parallel with a complementing "feminine" flip phone project (which became the Pebl), although it was a technical challenge. Motorola industrial designer Chris Arnholt was responsible for much of the Razr's distinct features: the phone had a strikingly thin profile at the time on a flip phone set, sported an electroluminescent keypad made out of a single metal wafer, housed in an aluminium body with an external glass screen. The "Razr" name was coined by executive Geoffrey Frost, who was instrumental in the phone's success. Rather than launching at a fair, Motorola CEO Edward Zander unveiled the Razr V3 at a presentation held in Chicago on July 27, 2004.

With its unique look and high price, it was initially positioned as a desirable premium product. Despite its otherwise average internal features, its groundbreaking and sleek exterior eventually made it extremely successful following price cuts. In the United States the V3 series was the most popular cell phone in 2005, 2006 and 2007 and remained best-selling until the latter half of 2008. The Motorola Razr has become an icon of mid-2000s popular culture as well as a defining icon of industrial design. The Razr series was succeeded in 2007 by the Motorola Razr2 series.

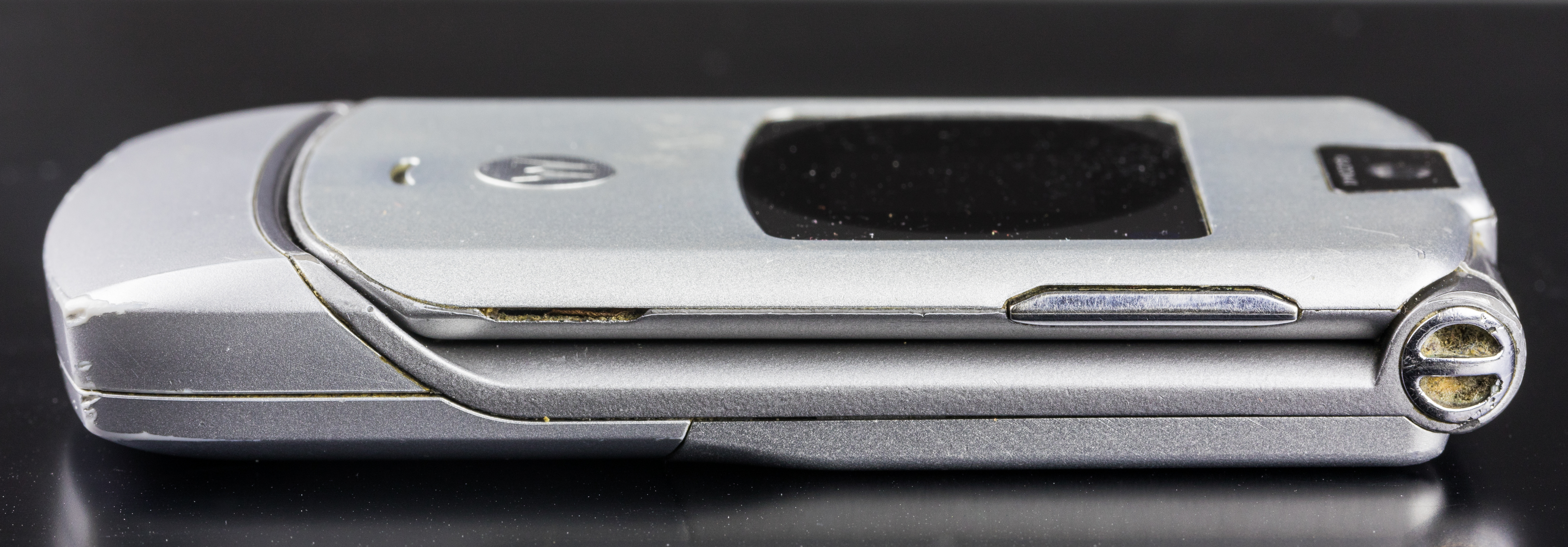
Side view of the RAZR V3 folded

== Features ==
As a clamshell device, the Motorola RAZR V3 features a small external display that displays incoming call information, time and notifications, and can be used as a camera viewfinder when closed. The device also features a Smart Key, located on the left hand side, that anticipates the user's next action. The key can also be used to capture a selfie with the camera while the flip is closed. On the right hand side, the V3 also features a voice dial key.

Although unique externally, internally the RAZR V3 was no different than the Motorola V500 series and V600, both of which had been conceived in 2003. Its specifications were approximately mid-range of its time, similar to the Motorola V620.

The original V3 model has a VGA resolution camera which is also capable of video recording. The device has a 2G cellular modem, although later 3G variants were also released. The phone includes a WAP 2.0 browser and an email client supporting IMAP and POP3. It also features Bluetooth connectivity.

The phone has a standard Mini USB (Mini-B) which is used for charging the battery as well as connection to a PC for data transfer and for using a headset.

== Release and colors ==
The Motorola V3 was released in the market in late 2004. It shipped first in Asia, before its November release in the US initially on the Cingular network operator. It was reportedly available in European territories by early September 2004.

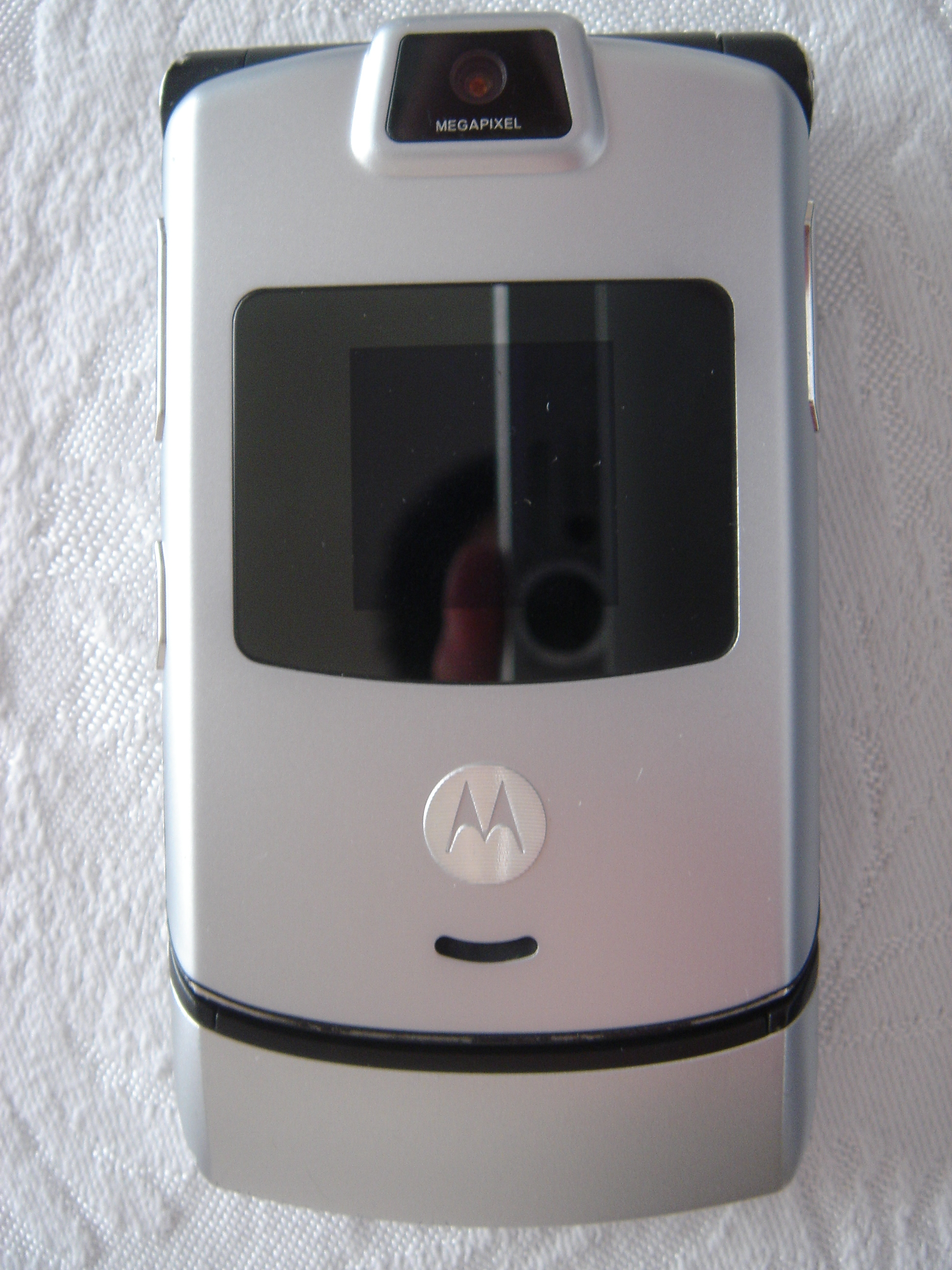
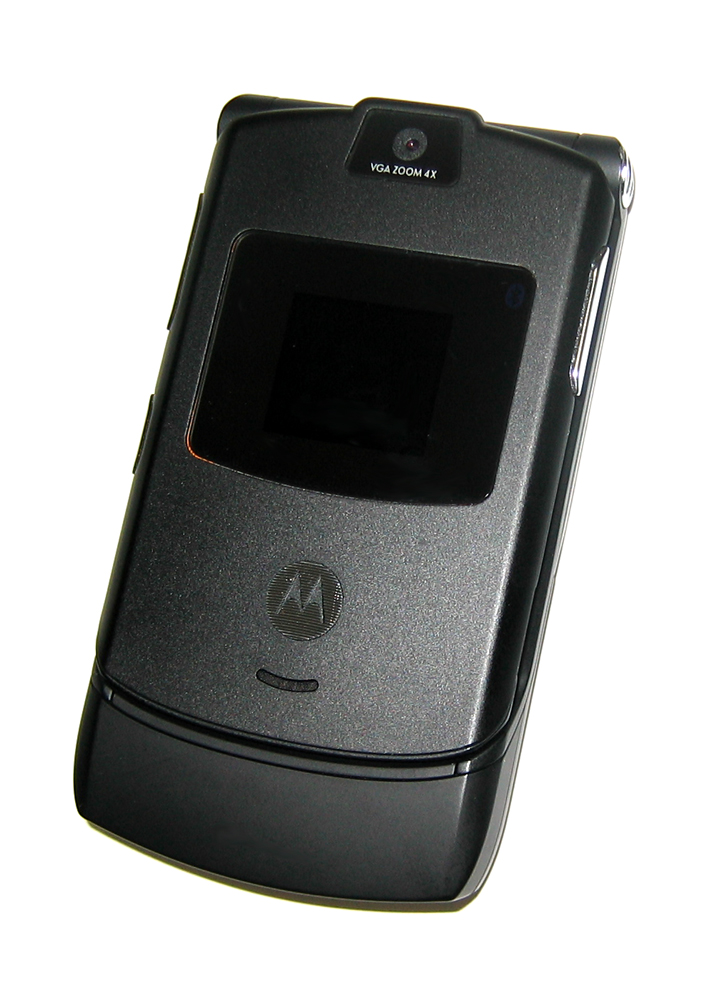
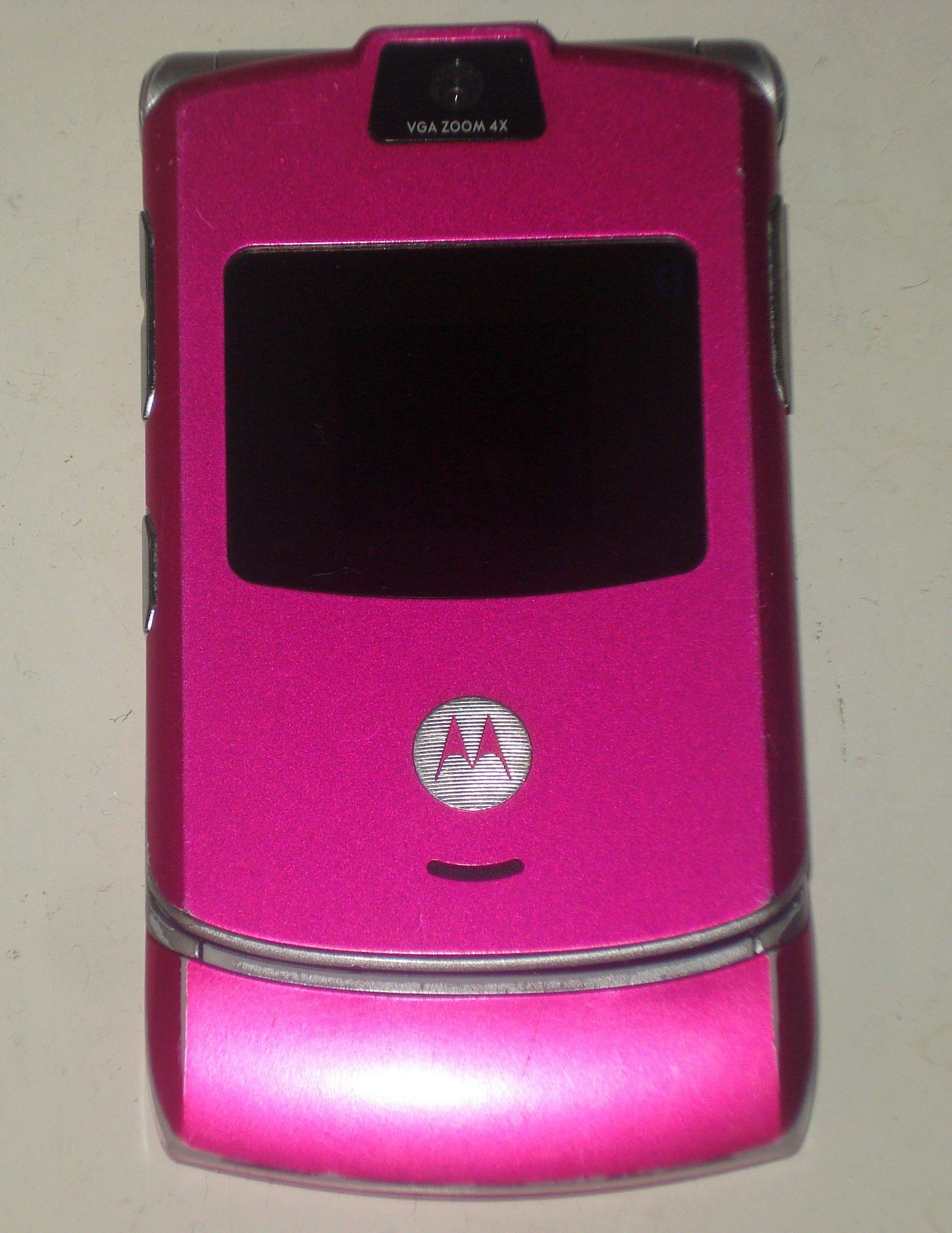
Silver, matte black and hot pink colors of the V3

A black version was produced for distribution in the 77th Academy Awards gift bags, and was released in early May 2005. While distribution was initially limited to specific carriers in North America, the black V3 was widely available elsewhere.

=== Hot pink versions ===
The first pink version was released in October 2005, and as of June 2006, was available in the United States from T-Mobile as the Razr V3 Magenta (after T-Mobile and its parent Deutsche Telekom's corporate color). It was called the Razr V3 Pink and available on other carriers, including on T-Mobile networks in other countries in addition to Verizon, Cingular Wireless, Suncom Wireless, and Cellular One (each in a different shade). It was also available in Canada from Bell, Rogers Wireless and Telus, and in the United Kingdom from T-Mobile and Carphone Warehouse. $25 of sales from the Rogers-branded pink V3 went to Rethink Breast Cancer. It was also available in all Movistar-serviced countries and Claro (Telcel).

=== Variants ===
==== V3c and V3m (CDMA2000) ====
The Motorola Razr V3c is the CDMA2000 version of the Razr V3, and supports the 3G CDMA 2000 1xRTT and 1xEV-DO technologies. It was released first on November 21, 2005, on Alltel and SaskTel carriers, then on December 7, 2005, to Verizon Wireless users. The V3c was also carried by Cricket Communications, Metro PCS, Canadian Telus, Bell Mobility and Aliant Mobility, Venezuelan Movistar and Movilnet, and Brazilian Vivo.

The original version of the V3c was charcoal gray, and a light pink version called Satin Pink (different from the GSM Magenta/Pink and the AT&T Cotton Candy versions) was released by Verizon Wireless in January 2006. Telus Mobility, Bell, Aliant, and Vivo also carried pink versions of the V3c.

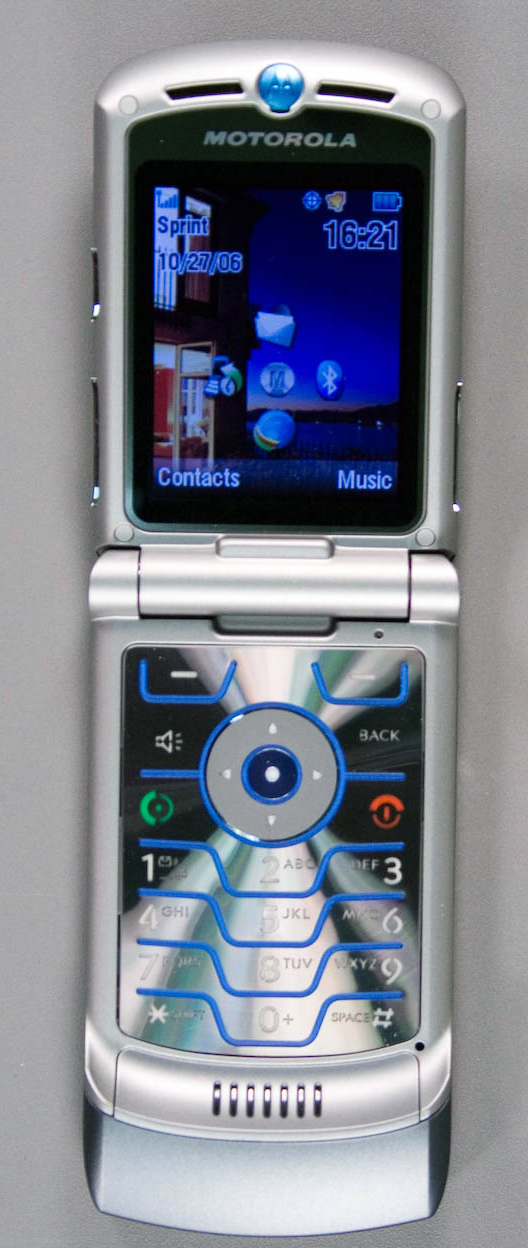
The RAZR V3m running on Sprint

The V3m was announced in April 2006 as an upgrade to the V3c. It features a microSD card slot for up to 2 GB of memory expansion, a longer-lasting battery, and a digital music player. The V3m came in silver, pink, and red although the original release, as well as models that used to be available on the Sprint CDMA network, featured the gunmetal gray color of the V3c. For a limited time Alltel and US Cellular offered a Fire Red color. Partnering with Motorola, US Cellular and Sprint released a special PRODUCT(RED) Razr and Bluetooth H500 headset to help support Global Fund programs which positively impact the lives of women and children affected by HIV/AIDS in Africa.

Wordmark with promotional Product Red Motorola logo

Verizon Wireless's versions of the Razr V3c and V3m use their own proprietary user interface and disable some features, including the ability to transfer files to and from the phone via Bluetooth (specifically, the OBEX protocol). Verizon blocked the transfer of most data over USB, such as ringtones. The V3m phones also run Binary Runtime Environment for Wireless (BREW), which signs each application to the phone's Electronic Serial Number, or ESN, thus preventing the use of free applications (including Back-Up Assistant). Equivalent models offered by competitors (such as the V3t) retained these features.

==== VE20 (CDMA2000) ====
The Razr VE20 is an updated CDMA model introduced in September 2008. It was released in the U.S. for Sprint, Alltel, and US Cellular. It incorporated some of the design elements of the Razr2 V9m at a reduced price. It features a QVGA main display, outer display with virtual touch keys, 2-megapixel camera, stereo Bluetooth, and a microSD memory card slot up to 8 Gb.

==== V3re (EDGE) ====
The Razr V3re (also known as V3_06) is a GSM model updated to support EDGE and CrystalTalk technology. It is nearly identical to the original V3, but can be identified by a slightly larger notch under the Motorola logo when closed, a black matte Motorola logo in the battery cover instead of the metallic silver logo in the V3 and a software version starting with R3442A. It was available in three colors: orchid pink, silver, and stone grey, and was carried in by T-Mobile and AT&T in the US, Rogers/Fido in Canada and Vivo in Brazil (using both 850 MHz and 1800 MHz).

==== South Korean variants ====
The Motorola MS500 is the Razr variant specific for the South Korea market, released on June 1, 2005. It was the first CDMA version of the Razr V3, designed to operate on SK Telecom. It does not, however, have Bluetooth capability, as opposed to the original GSM handset. It did however have an improved 1.3-megapixel camera as well as video recording, 80 MB of internal memory, and a variety of UI features, such as a mobile blog, Yoga graphic book, diet diary, and lottery number generator for wellness theme. On February 8, 2006, Motorola Korea released its own slide-phone model of the Razr, called the Motorola Razr Z (model no. MS600). A model that based on MS500 released as V3c in China, but with no relation with V3c that released in North America. Motorola Korea also released an upgraded version, known as Razr Luk (model no. MS500W) that is HSDPA network compatible and upgrades the screen to 2.2 inch TFT QVGA, 1.3-megapixel camera with Bluetooth, and microSDHC support. The model features different color pattern compare to previous MS500, and hit the South Korean market by late February 2009.

== V3x ==
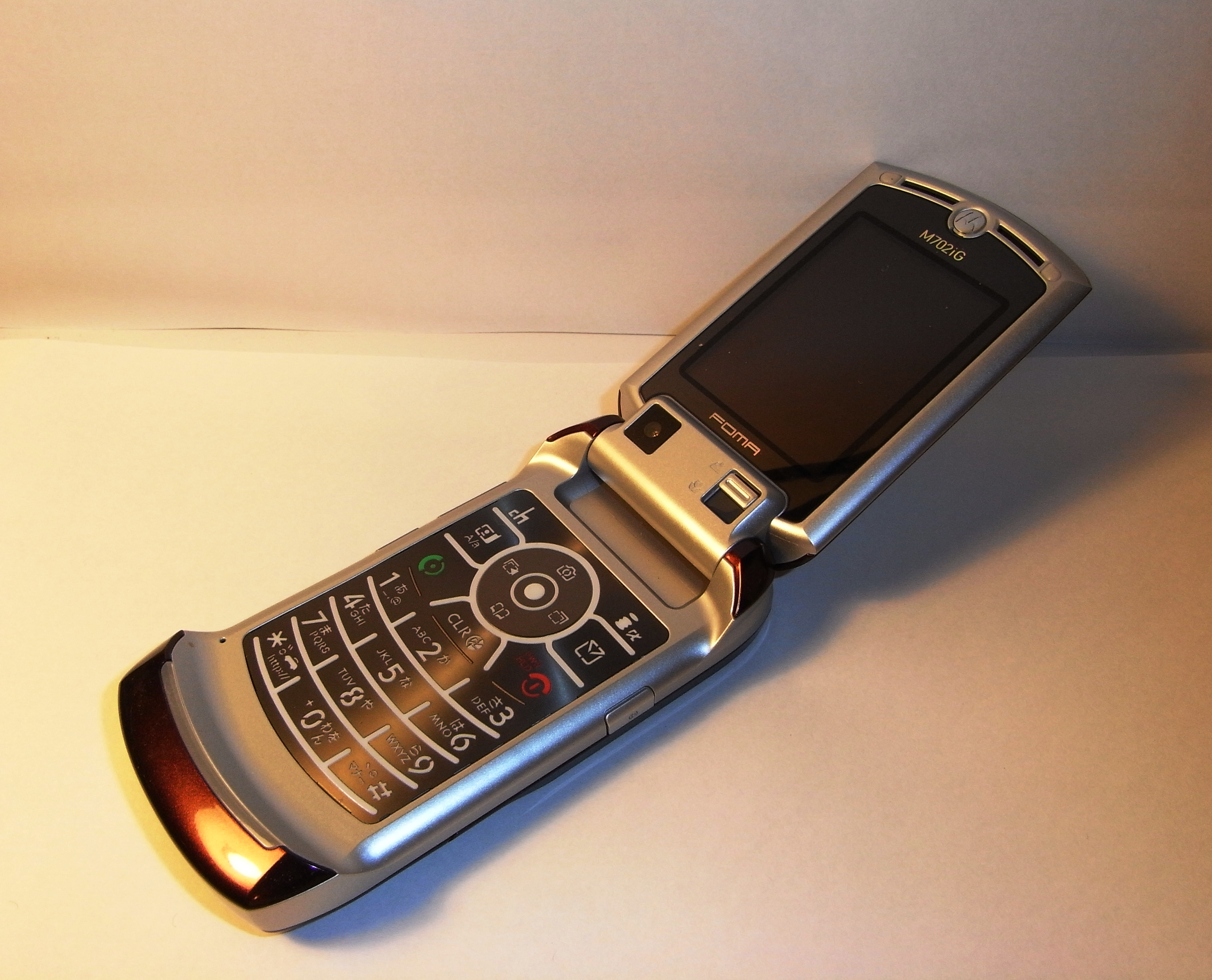
The FOMA M702iG (Japanese variant of the RAZR V3x)

Motorola Razr V3x is a 3G phone designed for European and Asian markets. It was originally announced in March 2005 as the Motorola V1150 (as an upgraded Motorola V1050 which itself succeeded the Motorola V975/V980), before it was renamed as Razr V3x to capitalize on the RAZR name. It was made official under the new name on October 18, 2005, with a slated Q4 2005 release.

The Razr V3x is fundamentally a very different device than the V3, using a different microprocessor, chipset, and Nvidia GoForce 4800 GPU. Its keypad design is notably different than that on the V3. In addition to being able to use 3G UMTS/WCDMA networks, the Razr V3x had other enhancements over the original V3 such as a 2.0-megapixel camera, a second (front) camera, and expandable memory, a feature set closer to the Motorola V980. However, with its added features and new internals, the V3x was substantially larger and heavier than the V3 – about 125 g (4.4 oz) and 20 mm (0.79 in) thick compared to 95 g (3.4 oz) and 13 mm (0.51 in).

The V3x was not released in North America. In Japan, the V3x was released on NTT DoCoMo as the FOMA M702iG, introduced in July 2006. The Motorola Razr V3x won the "Best 3GSM handset" at the 2006 3GSM World Congress. The Motorola RAZR maxx is considered to be its successor and this one was also released in North America.

== V3i ==
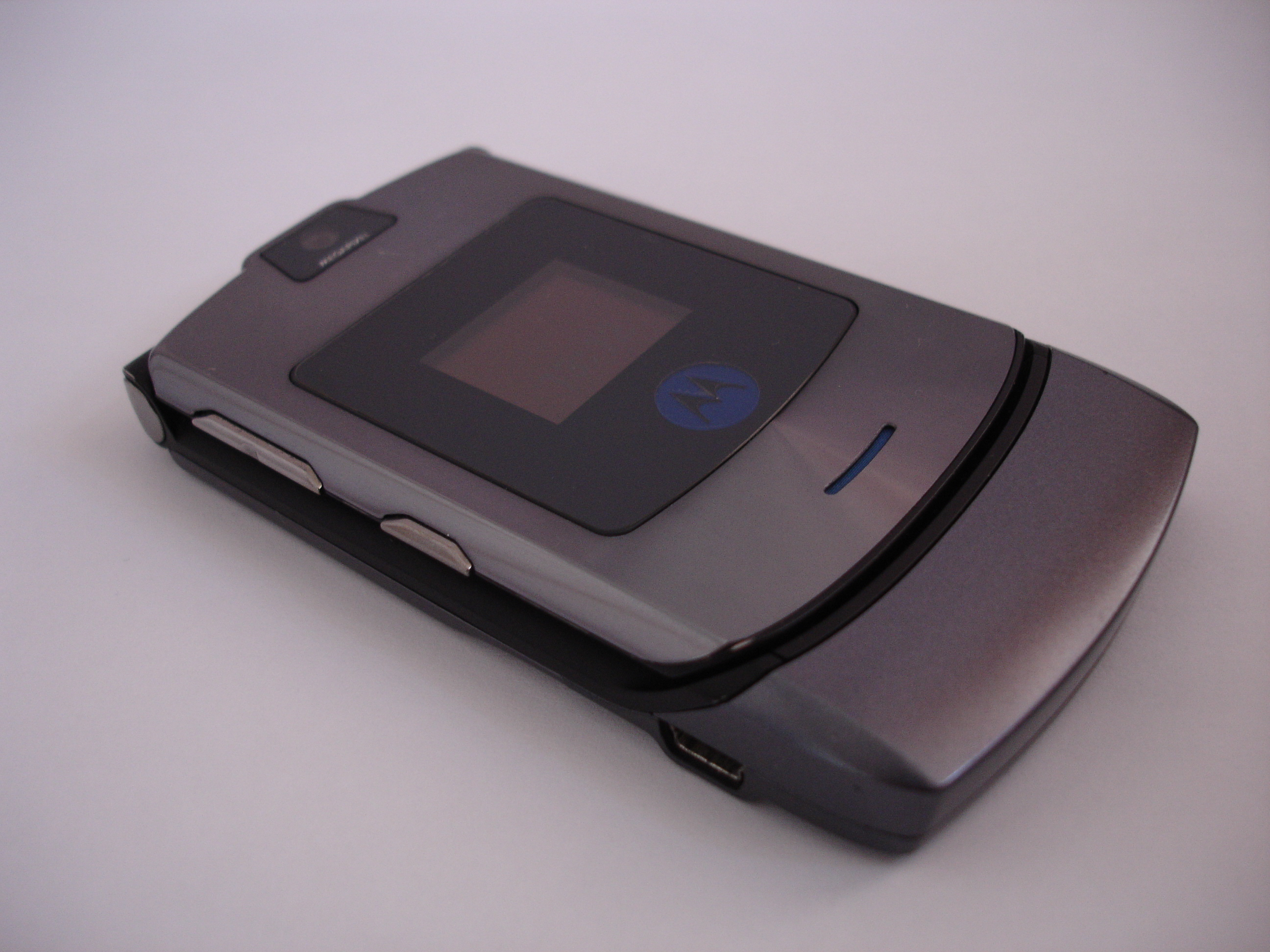
A folded V3i, showing the slightly distinct exterior

The Motorola Razr V3i, announced on November 8, 2005, and released to most worldwide markets in Q4 of 2005–2006, is the successor to the original Motorola Razr V3. It addressed some of the faults of the original by having a better (1.23-megapixel) camera with 8x digital zoom, support for microSD cards (up to 512 Mb maximum), and music playing capabilities - functionally it was very close to the Motorola V635. Cosmetically it is near-identical to the V3, with the main change being the manufacturer's 'M' icon moving onto the glass and the icon also being illuminated in blue.

It came in various colors, the main one being Silver Quartz while other colors include: Gunmetal Grey, Gold Plate, Dark Blue, Maroon, Violet, Orchid, Black for (PRODUCT)^{RED} (special edition to tie in with the (PRODUCT) RED initiative), Platinum, Red, Chrome Green, Chrome Purple, and Celery (also known as Lime Green).

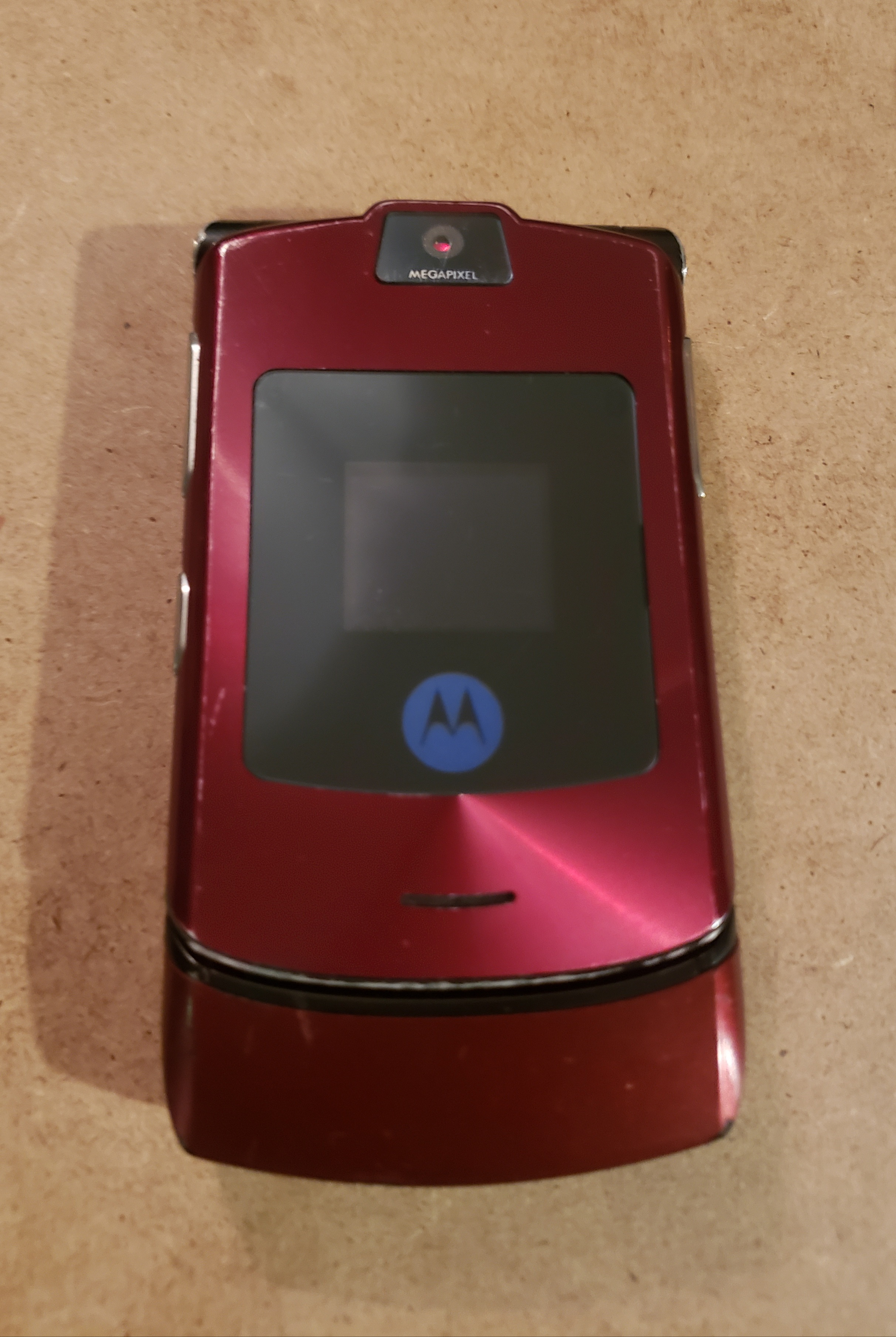
Motorola Razr V3r in red sold by Cingular

The Motorola Razr V3i was sold in two versions: one with Motorola's own Digital Audio Player (DAP), and another featuring iTunes, as part of a tie-up with Apple that also resulted in the Motorola ROKR E1. The V3i with iTunes have a 50 or 100 song limit restriction depending on where the phone model was made: in the European market, this version was sold as V3im with a 100-song cap, whereas T-Mobile, Cingular/AT&T, and Canadian cellular providers such as Rogers sold the V3i with no iTunes as the V3r and V3t.

=== Dolce and Gabbana special editions ===
A special edition gold version of the Razr V3i was launched in December 2005 in collaboration with Dolce & Gabbana (D&G). Only 1,223 units were built and it sold for a premium price. On June 1, 2006, Motorola and Dolce & Gabbana released another limited edition gold phone. This model included a D&G cell phone holder, a signature leather pouch, Bluetooth headphones, and FM earphones. It was available from all major Motorola retailers and select D&G boutiques.

== V3xx ==
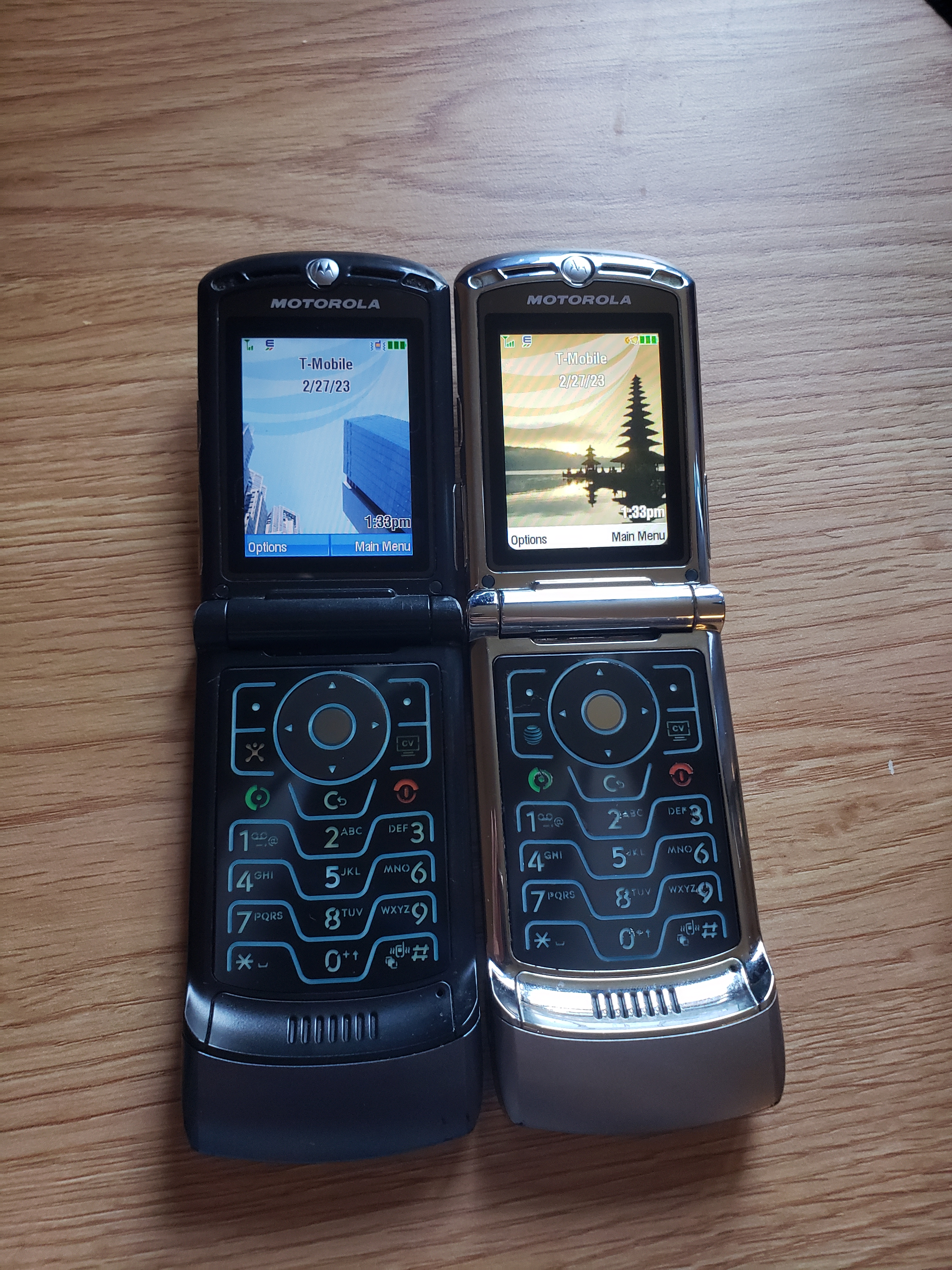
The AT&T Wireless version of the Motorola Razr V3xx

Announced in July 2006 (initially under the name RAZR XX), the Motorola Razr V3xx is another update to the V3, succeeding the V3i. This model is 3G compatible and supports HSDPA (technically "3.5G") networks as well as EDGE. It is still cosmetically almost the same as the original, except that it is marginally longer. It incorporates an improved feature set with a 1.3-megapixel camera (instead of 1.23-megapixel on the V3i), higher resolution 240x320 pixel (QVGA) main screen, 50 MB of internal memory (up from 10 MB), and Bluetooth version 2.0 with A2DP support. The secondary camera was not available in United States versions, however.

The built-in GPU, manufactured by Nvidia (model GoForce 4800) is capable of rendering 3D images through OpenGL ES. The phone includes a much faster CPU as well, improving the performance of all features, including 3G/data. With the new CPU, the V3xx also included a fast USB V2.0 for rapid ringtone/image/mp3 file downloads – older Razrs were limited to USB V1.1.

Unlike with the V3 and V3i which were both quad-band GSM, and thus worked on any GSM network, the V3xx came in different variants depending on the local frequency bands used for GSM and UMTS/HSDPA. The North American V3xx was tri-band (850/1800/1900 MHz) GSM and dual-band (850/1900 MHz) UMTS/HSDPA, whereas the version sold in Europe and Asia was tri-band (900/1800/1900 MHz) GSM and single-band (2.1 GHz) UMTS/HSDPA. This was likely due to the need to fit the internal components of the V3xx into a small casing; in early 2007 global phones that supported quad-band GSM and tri-band UMTS/HSDPA were considerably bulkier than the V3xx. A variant of the V3xx was released for Japan's NTT DoCoMo carrier, designed to work on the FOMA network, under the model name M702iS.

== Reception ==
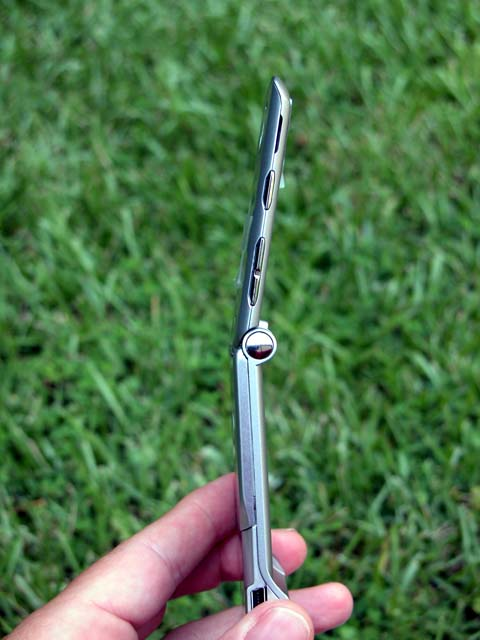
The thickness of the V3

The Razr (V3 including variants and updates) easily stood out amongst other phone models. It was one of the most popular mobile phones since its first release, having been spotted in the hands of celebrities and business people alike for a number of years. In the year 2009, almost five years after its original debut, it remained the third most popular phone in use in the U.S.

=== Sales ===
While initially marketed as an exclusive fashion phone, the Razr sold much better than the company expected, with 750,000 by the end of 2004 and generated a large part in record revenue for Motorola. With further price reductions Motorola reported sales had reached 50 million in July 2006. Leading up to the release, Motorola's cell phone division sales were stagnant and losing money. The success of the Razr made the division profitable again. Around the time of the V3's launch, Motorola had overtaken Nokia to become market leader in North America, and it also recovered back from falling to third place worldwide behind Samsung during the third quarter.

As of late 2007, an estimated 100 million Razrs had been sold (this may also include Razr Maxx V6), and as of 2008–2011 official numbers reported by major sources stated 110 million. Since then, many tech and lifestyle publications have cited a number of 130 million.

The V3 series led the American market until finally dropping from top spot in the latter half of 2008, replaced by the Apple iPhone 3G.

=== Criticism ===
The keypad was considered difficult to use, and the V3 also lacked an MP3 player and expandable memory.

Some owners complained about dust accumulating between the V3's plastic screen and LCD glass, possibly through an external side button. Access to the dust required peeling off the plastic cover, usually followed by a replacement cover.

== Legacy ==
The V3 was highly influential in the market and after its release a number of "clones" by other manufacturers were released, resembling the design of Motorola's handset. Motorola itself would make many other products bearing strong influences from the RAZR V3, such as the SLVR line of candybar phones and the narrower flip phone KRZR K1. Motorola released one more model in the Razr line without the V3 designation, other than variants: the RAZR maxx (V6).

The tech publication Engadget named the Razr V3 as one of the ten gadgets "that defined" the 2000s decade. Mobile Gazette's Retromobe publication, in 2008, named the Motorola Razr V3 one of the three "most influential phones in the past 5 years", with the other two named being the Nokia N95 and iPhone. The Razr is also the best-selling clamshell ("flip") mobile phone of all time.

While a major success, Motorola was unable to provide another hit product when the Razr was aging. The company's overliance on the Razr V3's design, without diversifying, was criticised in comparison to LG which after its Chocolate developed fresh-designed fashionable phones rather than recycling the old. It was partly why Motorola's market share dropped sharply in 2007 and the company posted a loss. On the other hand, LG, Samsung, Sony Ericsson and Nokia all gained. Revenue of Motorola's handset division shrunk 38% year-on-year in Q4 2007, a result which Business Insider labeled "terrible". While the Razr continued selling well in 2007 as a low-priced product, its successor, Motorola Razr2, failed to take off as consumers began preferring sliders and touchscreen slates. In 2008, Motorola announced that it will split into two.

Motorola Mobility re-introduced the Razr in reimagined and modern form, simply called Motorola Razr, released in 2020, using a flexible display.

=== In popular culture ===
The Razr became identified as a "fashion" product and an iconic cell phone in the mid-2000s. The Razr was used in several television shows and featured in several movies. In the 2006 film A Good Year, Russell Crowe's character Max Skinner used a BlackBerry whilst working as a high-flying London financier, but chose a black Razr to accompany his later laid-back life in rural Provence. Notable TV occasions were the season three finale of the TV series Lost in which Jack Shephard used a Razr (an important plot point which anchors the episode's chronology), the HBO hit sitcom Entourage had characters specifically Ari Gold using it, and the US hit series Burn Notice in which Michael Westen used a Razr until 2009. In Season 5 of 24, President Charles Logan used a Razr as his personal cell phone. Contestants on the NBC adventure reality show "Treasure Hunters" were given Razrs for communication with the host and each other throughout the season. The Product Red edition of the Razr was launched by Oprah Winfrey and Bono for charity. In Season 6 of The Sopranos, several characters including Tony Soprano and Silvio Dante used Razrs. Another fundamental appearance was in Criminal Minds' first 3 seasons, in which Derek Morgan is frequently seen using a black-coloured exemplar. A grey V3 was also used by Jeremy Clarkson on BBC's Top Gear during outtakes when he got a call at the start of the show. Even in 2012, the Razr was used as CIA-special agent Rex Matheson's phone in the 4th season of Torchwood. It was popularised in South India through the movie Vettaiyaadu Vilaiyaadu, in which Kamal Haasan was seen using the phone. In the computer game Counter-Strike: Source, the character Leet can be seen holding one. In Prison Break Series, Alexander Mahone used the Motorola V3. Also, in the 2006 film The Devil Wears Prada, characters played by Meryl Streep and Stanley Tucci used Moto Razr phones. The phone is featured prominently as part of a main plot point in the Peacock series The Resort. It was also a token piece in the popular modernized board game Monopoly Here & Now.

== See also ==
- Motorola KRZR K1
- Motorola Razr
- Motorola RIZR Z3
- Motorola PEBL U6
- Motorola SLVR L7
- Motorola V70
- Motorola W220
