= Motorola V60 =

Flip phone by Motorola released in 2001

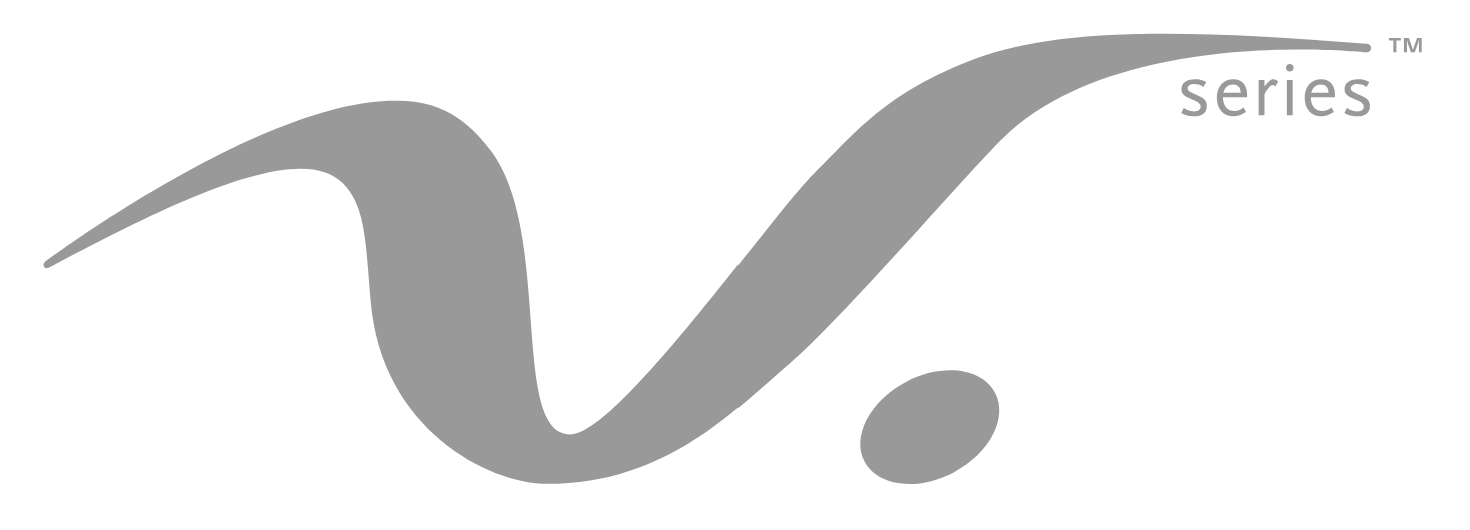

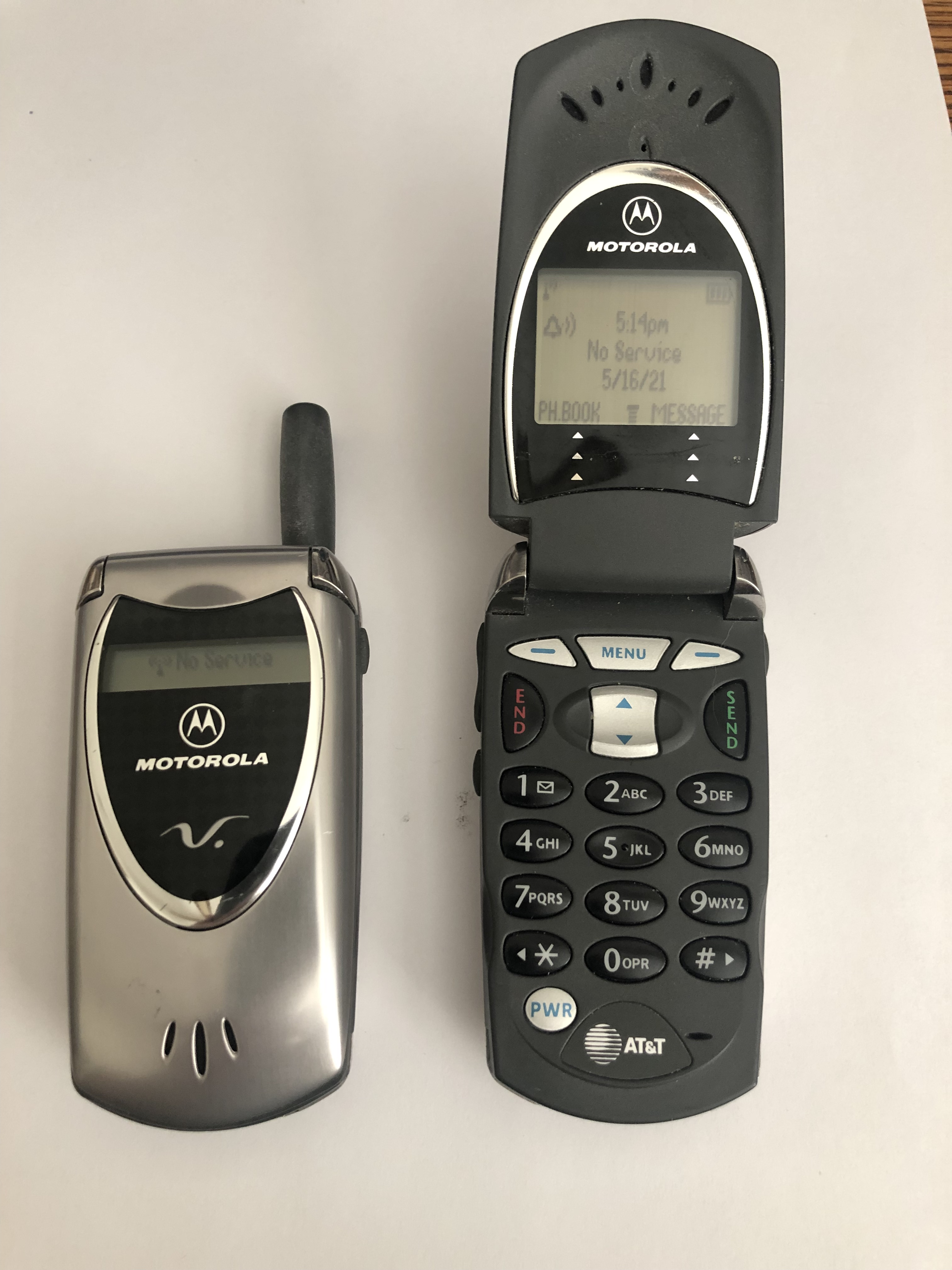
- Motorola V60t
- Also known as: Motorola v60c Motorola v60g Motorola v60t Motorola v60i
- Developer: Motorola
- Type: Mobile phone
- Series: V series
- First released: March 2001; 25 years ago
- Predecessor: Motorola StarTAC
- Successor: Motorola V600
- Related: Motorola Timeport 280; Motorola V66; Motorola V70
- Form factor: Clamshell
- Dimensions: 3.42 in (87 mm) H (folded); 1.77 in (45 mm) W 0.94 in (24 mm) D
- Weight: 3.8 oz (110 g)
- Display: 96x64 px
- Data inputs: Keypad
- Made in: Mexico

Motorola V60 (marketed and stylized as Motorola V. Series 60) is a clamshell mobile phone developed by Motorola. The handset was introduced at the 2001 Consumer Electronics Show as the company's flagship and was considered to be the true modern successor of the StarTAC series. It was sold in GSM, CDMA, and TDMA versions.

The Motorola V60 featured a sleek, metallic exterior casing that made it very recognizable at the time and was noted for looking luxurious and classy compared to other cell phones of its time. Also present here is a small external display to show the time or caller ID, one of the earliest 'flip phones' to have so. Internally, it included text messaging and wireless Internet capabilities. The V60 was hugely popular and was, for some time, the best-selling cell phone in North America. After a number of different variants were released, the V60 was succeeded by the Motorola V600.

== Features ==
The Motorola V60 was released two years after the original 'V' series, often seen as the first "real" clamshell phone. The V60 was a high-end feature phone during the time it was on the market. It was built on the same new platform as the Motorola V66 (the V60 is 30 grams (1.1 oz) heavier) and the Motorola Timeport 280.

The internal screen is monochrome and has a resolution of 96 by 64 pixels and uses OptiMax technology, displaying 3 lines of text, and an emerald colored backlight. The external display was unique for its time, although it was not the first, as that feat belongs to Samsung's SGH-A200 and SGH-A300. The Motorola V60 includes GPRS 4+1 for what was then fast data speeds and included a WAP browser. It however lacked an IrDA (infrared) port.

== Release and variants ==
Three versions of the V60 were sold; the V60g (triband GSM 900/1800/1900), V60c (trimode CDMA 850/1900 and AMPS 850), and V60t (dual mode TDMA 850/1900 and AMPS 850). The CDMA units have a retractable antenna and the TDMA units have a stubby antenna.

The Motorola V60 was first released (as V60c) in the US on March 26, 2001 on Alltel. V60c was released on Verizon in July 2001. The V60c was sold for about $349 on a one year contract, $399 on two year, and $449 on a three year contract. The V60g was sold for about $649 directly. It was later released (V60t) by Cingular and AT&T.

Abroad, Hutchison Telecom carried the Motorola V60 in Hong Kong released in the August of 2001. It was also released in China, Singapore and Taiwan in 2001. The V60 also released in Europe beginning around November 2001, although the Motorola V66 (which is slightly smaller than V60 and has plastic housing) had already been on the market for a while. It costed 1,300 DM in Germany (approximately 1,065€ in 2025).

=== V60i and v60x ===
The Motorola V60i expanded upon the V60 model. Externally it added a revised color scheme and removable faceplates. It added Java Micro Edition capability for running software such as mobile games and added the ability for downloadable ringtones and graphics. The V60i was announced on February 14, 2002 and was initially available on Verizon, then AT&T and U.S. Cellular, and in other countries. A common problem with this model was the antenna snapping off for no particular reason.

In April 2003, a special V60i was announced with Harley-Davidson branding, exclusively sold at Harley-Davidson dealerships.

The V60x is another model of the V60i that adds BREW applet support, picture messaging, GPS location and CDMA2000 1x data. It was released in 2003.

=== V60p and V60s ===
Motorola V60p is a CDMA variant of the V60 with a speakerphone, designed for use with Verizon Wireless's push-to-talk (PTT) service that launched in the US in August 2003, with it being the first device released for the service. It is thicker than a regular V60 and has a rubberized PTT button on its side. Motorola V60s is a version that is identical but without the PTT ability. V60s was also carried by Qwest in addition to Verizon.

=== V60t Color ===
V60t Color is a color display variant released in September 2003 on Cingular for $149 on a two year contract.

=== V60v ===
Motorola V60v is a variant for Sprint PCS.

== Mercedes-Benz ==
Beginning in December 2001, Motorola V60c units began to be offered by Mercedes-Benz dealerships in the US as part of in-car handsfree phone systems.

The V60i for Verizon Wireless was also included with some Mercedes-Benz models, and integrated with the vehicle's COMAND infotainment system, as well as its telematics system. In these vehicles, the V60i included Mercedes-Benz branding.

== See also ==
- Motorola V series (Vader/Wings)
- Motorola V120
- Motorola T720
