= Ericsson T28 =

Mobile phone model

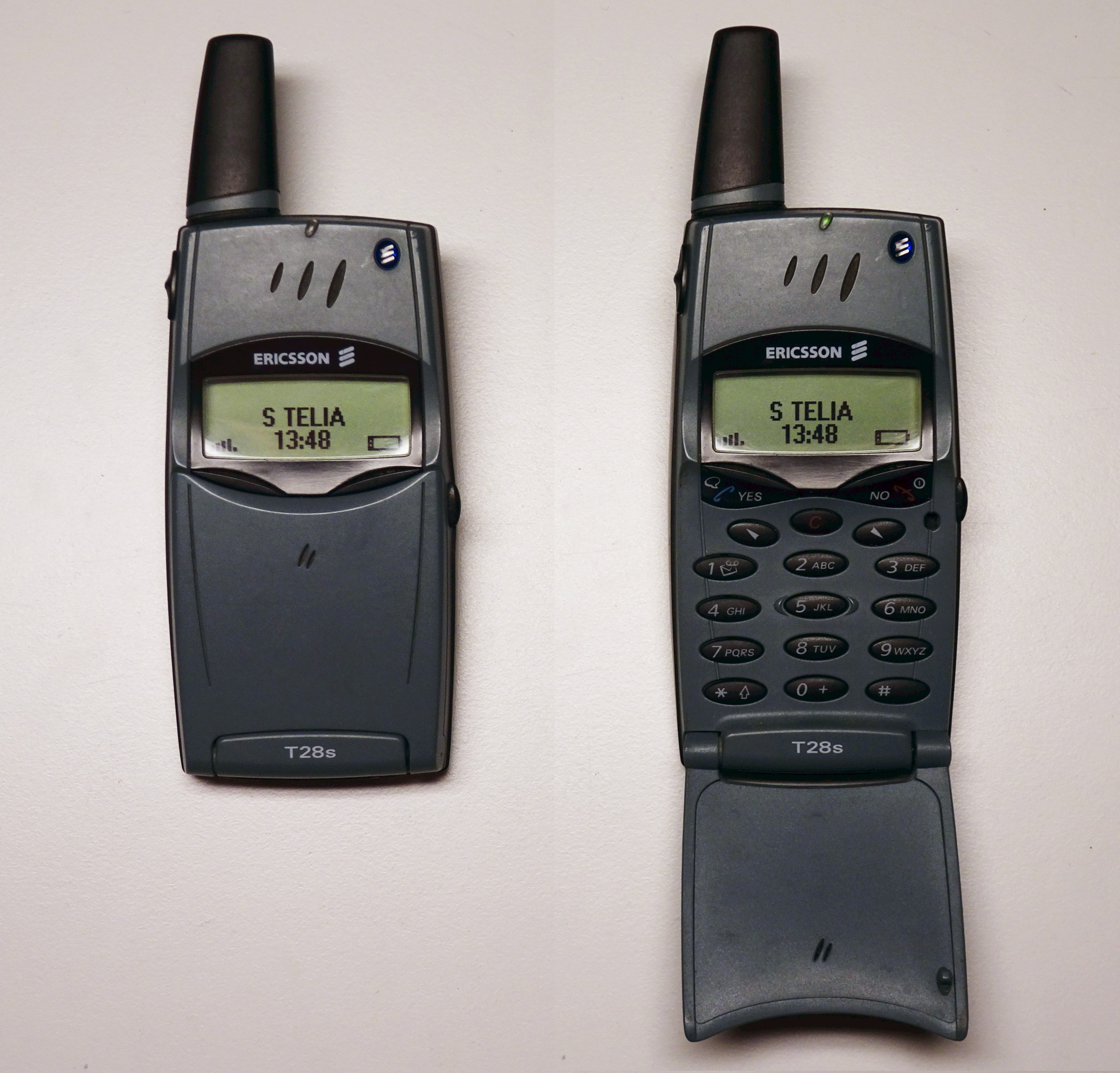
Ericsson T28.

The Ericsson T28s is a GSM dual-band, compact flip mobile phone manufactured by Swedish telecom company Ericsson Mobile Communications. It first shipped in September 1999. The T28 was designated as Ericsson's premium phone product, as such it was priced substantially higher (often more than triple) the price of the T10 and T18 models - their nearest cosmetic and functional competitors.

== Description ==
The T28 was one the lightest and slimmest mobile phones at the time, with a weight of only 83 grams - this weight matched or almost matched Motorola's V phone of the time.

Like many mobile phones of the time (1999) it had a fixed, stubby external antenna. It was probably best known as the first phone that used lithium polymer batteries. At one point, it was the best selling mobile phone in the USA.

In terms of market positioning, Ericsson designated this as a premium phone. It has a tiny LCD screen and a spring-loaded latch mechanism to release the 'flip.'

It came in three colours—very dark blue, lighter blue and sand. The sand version being the least common. It was listed as compatible with two batteries. A normal slim-line and an ultra-slim lower capacity battery. However the device was also battery-compatible with the later R320 and R520 series.

== Models and variants ==
Four different versions of the T28 were sold. T28z was compatible with GSM1900 for use in North America. T28s was compatible with GSM900/1800 for use in the rest of the world - this is by far the most common version. T28 World was compatible with GSM900/1900 for use worldwide on GSM900 and North America on GSM1900 (this was the second World phone Ericsson introduced, the first being the I888 which had the distinction of being the first commercially available GSM900/1900 phone). A special version, the T28sc was released in China with support for reading and entering Chinese characters.
