= Motorola W220 =

Mobile phone

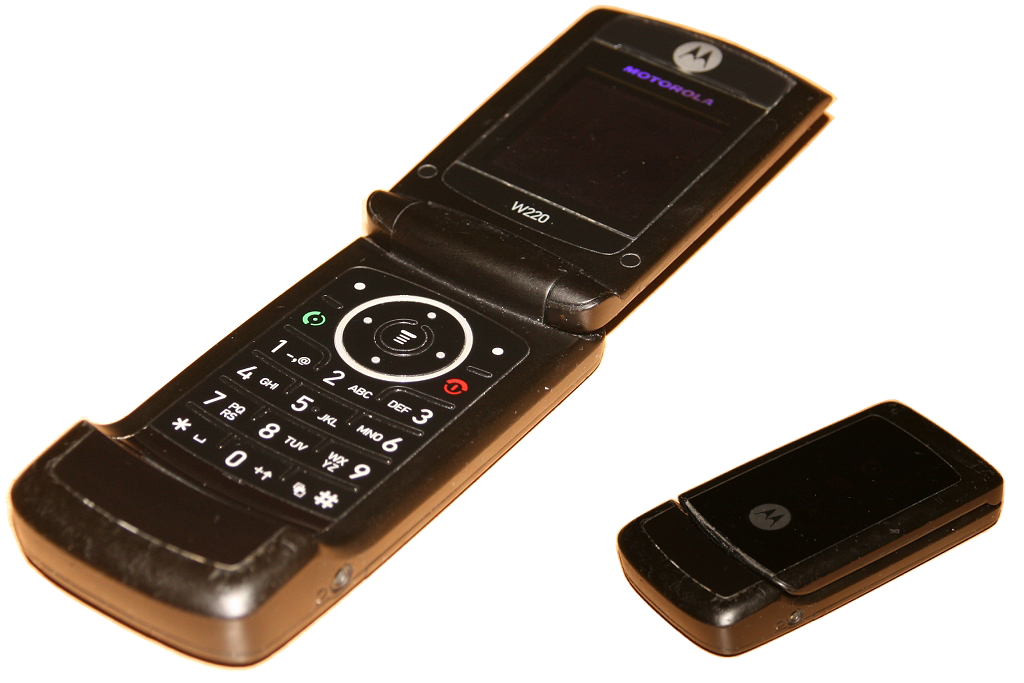
- First released: July 2006; 19 years ago
- Compatible networks: GSM 900 / 1800
- Dimensions: 95×46×16.7 mm (3.74×1.81×0.66 in)
- Weight: 93 g (3 oz)
- Display: 128x128 CSTN display (28 x 28 mm)

The Motorola W220 is an entry-level clamshell style mobile phone for the GSM network, developed by Motorola and announced in February 2006. Visually its design was based on the popular Razr from the same manufacturer, but the W220 was sold at a low price for the mass market. It initially retailed at a price equivalent to US$99, although this depended on market.

The phone features dual-band GSM capabilities, and has a 65k color screen. Unlike the Motorola Razr V3 and V3i, the Motorola W220 does not have an external display but instead has three backlit icons for: incoming call, received text message, and battery status. Its most notable extra feature is the built in FM radio. Other than these, it has MMS support and a basic calendar and alarm clock.

The W220 was also the first product of Motorola's 'W' prefixed series of low end handsets. In June 2006, a higher positioned model was introduced to complement the W220, the Motorola W375. This model adds an integrated camera and some other additions like MP3 music playing capability.
