= Motorola Pebl =

Mobile phone produced by Motorola

Motorola PEBL U6 MOTOPEBL

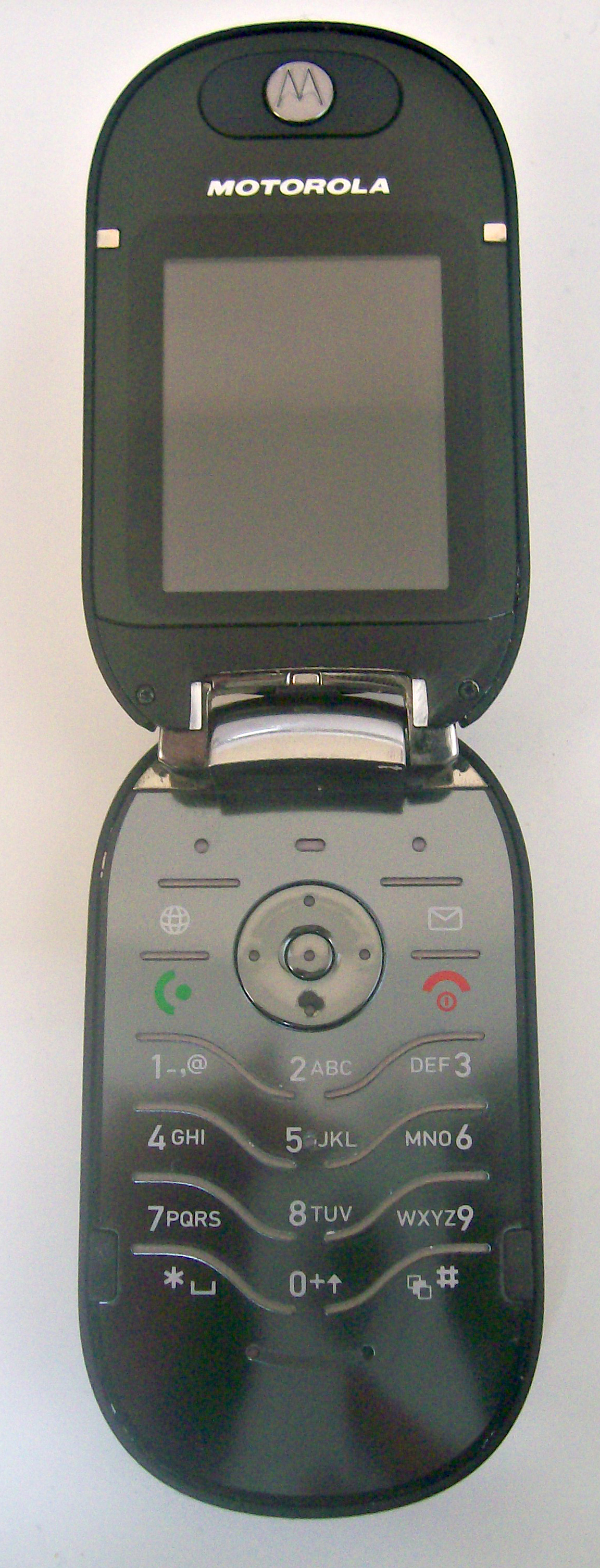
- Availability by region: Q4 2005
- Compatible networks: GSM 850/900/1800/1900 (quad band)
- Dimensions: 49×87×20 mm (1.93×3.43×0.79 in)
- Weight: 110 g / 3.8 oz
- Memory: 5 MB internal
- Rear camera: VGA, 640x480 pixels, video
- Display: 1.8inch, 176×220 pixels 262,000 color TFT LCD
- Connectivity: mini-USB, Bluetooth (Class 1.2), GPRS class 10 (4+1/3+2 slots) 32 - 48 kbit/s, WAP 2.0/xHTML.

The Motorola Pebl U6 (styled PEBL, pronounced pebble) is a clamshell/flip mobile phone designed and developed by Motorola. The Pebl U6 was first shown in February 2005 originally as the V6 before being unveiled as the U6 in July 2005. It was named for its small and sleek appearance, as well as to evoke comparisons to a "pebble". The U6 is a GSM model: a CDMA variant, U6c, was announced in December 2006 for some markets.

Unlike the company's then other fashionable handsets, Motorola Razr (V3) and Motorola Slvr (L7), the Motorola Pebl (U6) foregoes a slim profile for rounder shapes and a thicker base. The clamshell mechanism has a hatch that releases a spring to unfold the phone. Other than being thicker, the Pebl is smaller than the Razr which also means a smaller (1.8 inch) display while the second external display is downgraded to be monochrome. Like the Razr, the Pebl has modest internal specifications very similar to the V600 and V500 series.

In the US, the Motorola Pebl was released on December 14, 2005, exclusively carried by T-Mobile, and the company ran a Pebl ad at the 2006 Super Bowl, although it did not match the grand popularity of the Razr.

== Design and appearance ==
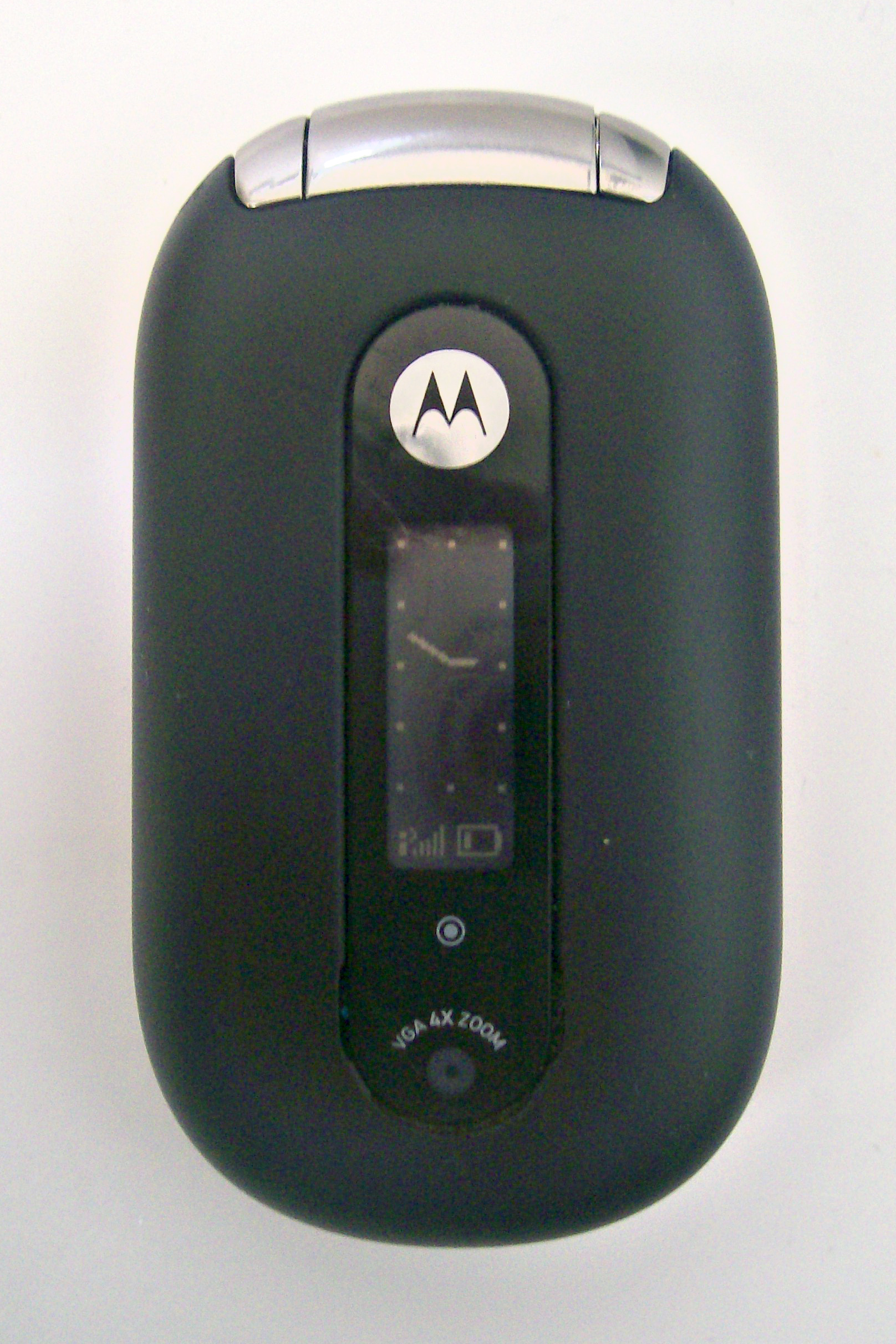
Motorola U6 (folded)

The body of the Pebl U6 is primarily made out of metal, although everything other than the hinge has a colour coating which makes it matte rather than shiny. The external texture is polished but not quite smooth, resisting finger prints and smudges. Buttons and connectors are kept flush in order to maintain the phone's smooth appearance. In contrast to many other products with a one line external display, the external screen is mounted vertically, rather than horizontally.

The unit is held closed by magnets, and can be opened with a single hand by pushing the lid of the phone away from the hinge mechanism. The hinge itself is spring-loaded, so that when cracked it actively swings fully open. This dual hinge design was unique.

== Release and colors ==
Initially, the product was available only in black, but in the second quarter of 2006, Motorola launched four additional colours, likely due to the popularity of the pink color of the Razr V3. The Pebl was produced in black, blue, green, red, orange and pink, although the exact colour selection varied per country. Shortly before the new colors became available, Motorola commissioned photographer David LaChapelle to capture the new Pebl phones in a colourful photo shoot.

== Features ==
- Java ME MIDP 2.0 compatible
- E-mail client
- MMS, Wireless Village instant messaging and e-mail
- Motorola SCREEN3 push technology for dynamic news and content
- MPEG-4 video and JPEG still image capture
- Speaker-independent voice dialing
- WAP 2.0 web browser
- Bluetooth
- Integrated speakerphone (handsfree)
- SCREEN3

== In popular culture ==
The Motorola Pebl is used by George Clooney's character in the film Michael Clayton.

== Related phones ==
The rounded profile of the Motorola Pebl was also later used on the Motorola W315, an entry-level CDMA handset released in 2006.

In September 2007, Motorola introduced the Motorola Pebl U3, using the PEBL moniker. It is very similar to the Pebl U6 but has changes in the design, interface, as well as the removal of Bluetooth and a lower screen resolution.

In October 2007, Motorola announced a new phone called Motorola U9, seen as an upgraded of the Pebl U6. It features Motorola's MotoMagx OS, a better display, an improved 2.0-megapixel camera, a microSD card slot and touch-sensitive music keys. The phone was made available in the first half of 2008. This phone does not have the PEBL moniker. It originally used the ROKR moniker when it was announced. A version marketed as MOTOJEWEL was also produced.

Motorola Korea locally released a new 3G-capable Pebl in South Korea in 2008.

== See also ==
- Motorola Razr V3
