= Motorola V975/V980 =

Cell phone released in 2004

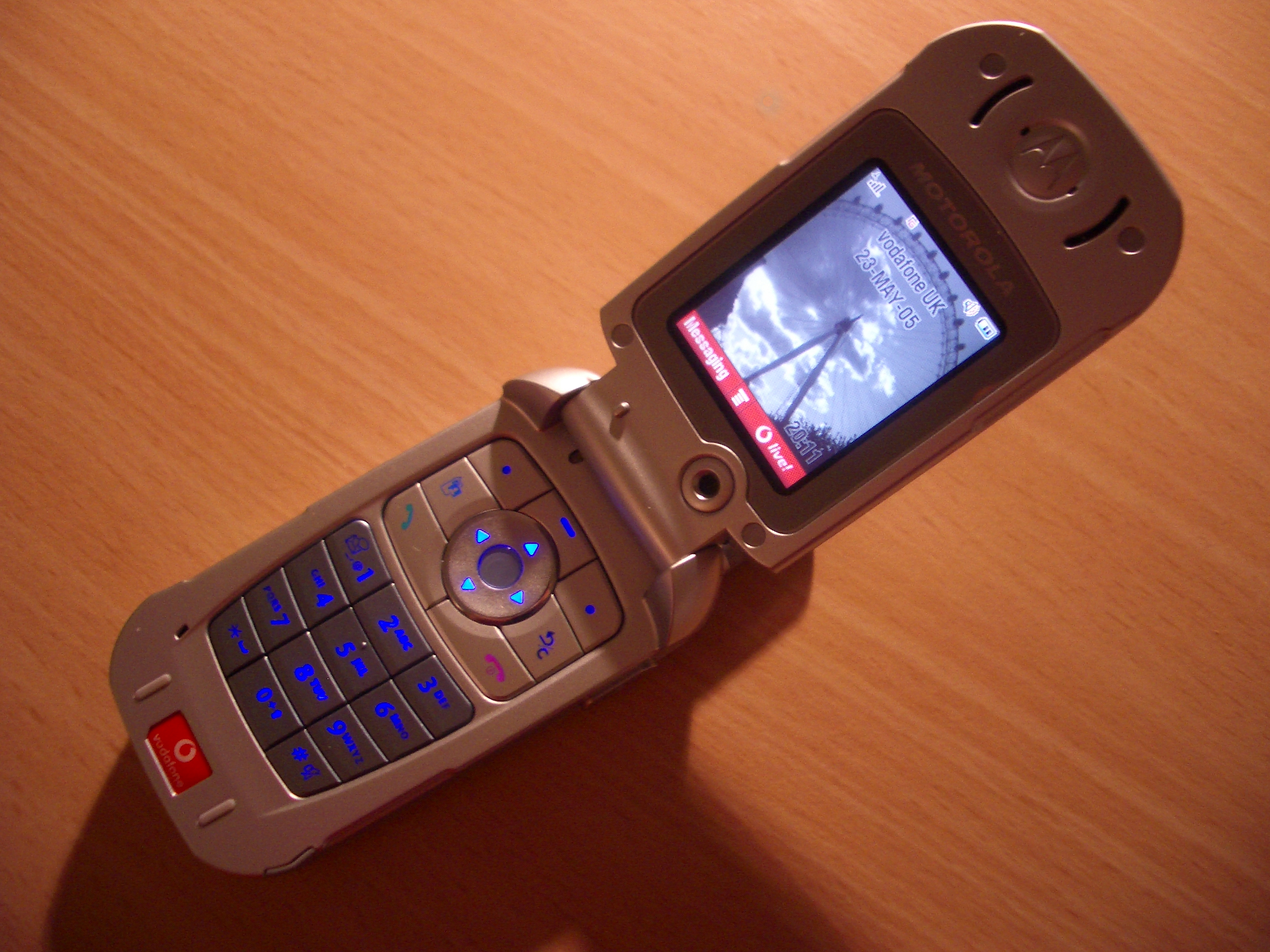
- Motorola V980
- Developer: Motorola
- Type: Mobile phone
- First released: 2004; 22 years ago
- Form factor: Clamshell
- Dimensions: 94 mm (3.7 in) H (folded); 49 mm (1.9 in) W 27 mm (1.1 in) D
- Weight: 137 g (4.8 oz)
- Display: 1.9 inch 176x220 pixels
- External display: CSTN 4K color
- Data inputs: Keypad

Motorola V975 is a 3G mobile phone developed by Motorola. While larger and heavier than comparable GSM flip phones of its time, it supported "next generation" services such as video calling because of its UMTS 3G connection. It was announced on July 27, 2004 alongside numerous other handsets and was released in European and Asian markets in late 2004.

The Motorola V975's functions include those of a camera phone, portable media player, in addition to text messaging. It has Bluetooth connectivity, a built-in MP3 player, a VGA digital camera with 4x zoom, 16 MB of internal memory and up to 256 MB of additional memory in the form of a TransFlash card. Along with video telephony, it has a web browser, email client, MMS and copy/cut/paste.

The V975 was Motorola's first 3G flip phone. A candybar equivalent was also released, called Motorola C975. A variant of the Motorola V975 called Motorola V980 was released specifically for Vodafone. The Japanese version is called Vodafone 702MO. The V980 likewise had a candybar equivalent, named C980.

Motorola V980 was succeeded by the Vodafone-only Motorola V1050. Its upgraded version, originally V1150, became Motorola Razr V3x.

== See also ==
- Motorola E815 - Motorola's first CDMA 3G phone with EV-DO
