= Albert Nagele =

American artist and designer (1935–2018)

- Born: 15 October 1935; Sheldon
- Died: 16 February 2018 (aged 82); Skokie
- Education: College of Fine and Applied Arts
- Occupations: Artist, designer, industrial designer
- Employers: Bell & Howell; Motorola
- Notable work: DynaTAC, StarTAC

Albert Nagele (1935–2018) was an American artist and designer. He was instrumental in the design and development of a number of mobile phone models that are considered pivotal milestones in the evolution of mobile telephony. Examples of his work are held in museums.

== Biography ==
Nagele born in Sheldon, Illinois and grew up on a farm. He graduated from the University of Illinois graduating in 1962 with a degree in Industrial design and fine art. As a student at the university, he won won an annual $500 Motorola undergraduate design award, "as the top member of his class ... on the basis of a plywood stool and other designs." He would later work for the company.

At Motorola he designed the PHS Radiotelephone, DynaTac, and other models, for which he was granted multiple US patents. These models were significant for popularising the clamshell form factor, for which Motorola trademarked the term flip phone.

Prior to joining Motorola, he worked for Bell & Howell.

== Legacy ==
Designs credited to Nagele are in the collection of the National Museum of American History, Cooper Hewitt, Smithsonian Design Museum. and the Museum of Modern Art (MoMA).

His design for the V 3682 Cellular Telephone was included in MoMA's 2025 exhibition Pirouette: Turning Points in Design, an exhibition which featured "widely recognized design icons ... highlighting pivotal moments in design history." In her curatorial note, Paola Antonelli, the museum's curator compared the device to the Sony Walkman, noting that it "enabled users to carry their private space anywhere, expanding one’s metaphysical sphere beyond one’s physical confines."
