= Motorola Accompli 009 =

Smartphone released in 2000

- Developer: Motorola
- First released: 2000
- Form factor: Clamshell
- Dimensions: 97 mm (3.8 in) H 71.5 mm (2.81 in) W 27.1 mm (1.07 in) D
- Weight: 216 g (7.6 oz)
- Operating system: Wisdom OS
- Display: 240 x 160 pixels
- Data inputs: QWERTY

Motorola Accompli 009 is a communicator style GSM cell phone designed and developed by Motorola. The device has GPRS, voice calling and a color display, along with a WAP browser, email, PIM functionality. It was announced on September 26, 2000 and released in Europe then in the US in September 2001.

Accompli 009 has a 256 color display and runs on Motorola's proprietary Wisdom OS operating system. This was seen as a disadvantage against Palm OS and EPOC. It has been referred to as a smartphone for its abilities and tri-band GSM cellular feature. The Motorola Accompli 009 also has the ability to send faxes. Some considered it to be an "always on" device rivaling BlackBerry.

CNN.com described it as a device that "does everything": "It’s a pager, a personal information manager (PIM), wireless e-mail unit, wireless Internet device and a wireless phone."

The Wisdom OS was also used on the Motorola PageWriter 2000, the Motorola Timeport P935 and later the Motorola A630. The phone also makes a cameo appearance in Vin Diesel's XXX.
