= GoForce =

Line of graphics cards

The Nvidia GoForce was a line of graphics chipsets that was used mainly in handheld devices such as PDAs and mobile phones. Nvidia acquired graphics display processor firm MediaQ in 2003, and rebranded the division as GoForce. It has since been replaced by the Nvidia Tegra series of SoCs.

== Features ==
=== GoForce 2100 ===
Featuring VGA image capture, 2D graphics acceleration, JPEG support, and MJPEG acceleration. Used in the Samsung SCH-M500 Palm OS based flip-phone.

=== GoForce 2150 ===
Featuring 1.3-megapixel camera support, JPEG support, and 2D graphics acceleration. Supports 3-megapixel images with the upgrade.

=== GoForce 3000/GoForce 4000 ===
The GoForce 4000 supports 3.0-megapixel camera and MPEG-4/H.263 codec, whilst GoForce 3000 is a low-cost version of the GoForce 4000 with limited features.

=== GoForce 4500 ===
Features 3D graphics support with a geometry processor and programmable pixel shaders, used in the Gizmondo device.

=== GoForce 4800 ===
Supports 3.0-megapixel camera and a 3D graphics engine. It was used in the Sony Ericsson W900i, and in the Motorola V3x.

=== GoForce 5500 ===
The GoForce 5500 is a multimedia processor, incorporates Tensilica Xtensa HiFi 2 Audio Engine (based on the Xtensa LX processor licensed in 2005). It can decode video and audio formats, such as WMV, WMA, MP3, MP4, MPEG, JPEG and supports H.264. Also including a 24-bit 64-voice sound processor with supports up to 32 MB of external memory, 10-megapixel camera support, and 3D graphics engine version 2. It was used in the i-mate Ultimate 6150 smartphone.

=== GoForce 5300 ===
Equipped with 2.25 MiB embedded DRAM (eDRAM) on TSMC's 65 nm process, being the first in the GoForce product line. Its multimedia technology is claimed to be similar to the 5500's, but it does not sport a 3D engine and only supports much smaller screens.

=== GoForce 6100 ===
The latest chipset in the series, the GoForce 6100 (showcased in 2007), claiming the first applications processor by NVIDIA, adds 10-megapixel camera support and integrated 802.11b/g support (with external RF), based on a 130 nm process. It contains a 250 MHz ARM1176JZ-S core.

== Implementations ==
- Acer N300 PDA
- HTC Foreseer
- Gizmondo
- iMate Ultimate 6150
- iMate Ultimate 8150
- iRiver G10
- Kyocera W41K
- Kyocera W51K
- Kyocera W52k
- LG KC 8100
- Mitsubishi M900
- Motorola E770v
- Motorola E1000
- Motorola RAZR V3x
- Motorola RAZR V3xx
- Motorola RAZR2 V9
- Motorola RAZR maxx V6
- O2 Xda Flame
- Samsung i310
- Samsung SGH-P910
- Samsung SGH-P940
- Samsung Sync SGH-A707
- Sandisk Sansa View
- Sendo X
- Sharp EM-ONE S01SH
- SimCom S788
- Sony Ericsson W900
- Toshiba Portege G900

== See also ==
- Imageon
- Nvidia Tegra
