= Motorola V120 =

Cell phone released in 2001

The Motorola V120, marketed and stylized as Motorola V.series 120, is a candybar-style cell phone released by Motorola in 2001. It was released in two variants: a CDMA one (v120c) and a TDMA one (v120t). The latter has a fixed antenna whereas the v120c has an extendable one.

It was mainly used with Verizon and Alltel networks, and included a number of simple features. It was also released in Canada. The model exists in black and in silver, but there were other plastic covers from third party manufacturers. It was very similar to the Motorola v60, but it had only one screen and it was a candybar format phone instead of a clamshell. A big criticism was the unreliable software that the phone had, with several bugs.

The v120c was rated number three on the list of the ten highest radiation-emitting cell phones.
