= Motorola V500 =

Flip phone by Motorola released in 2004

Motorola V500/501/525/535/547/555/557
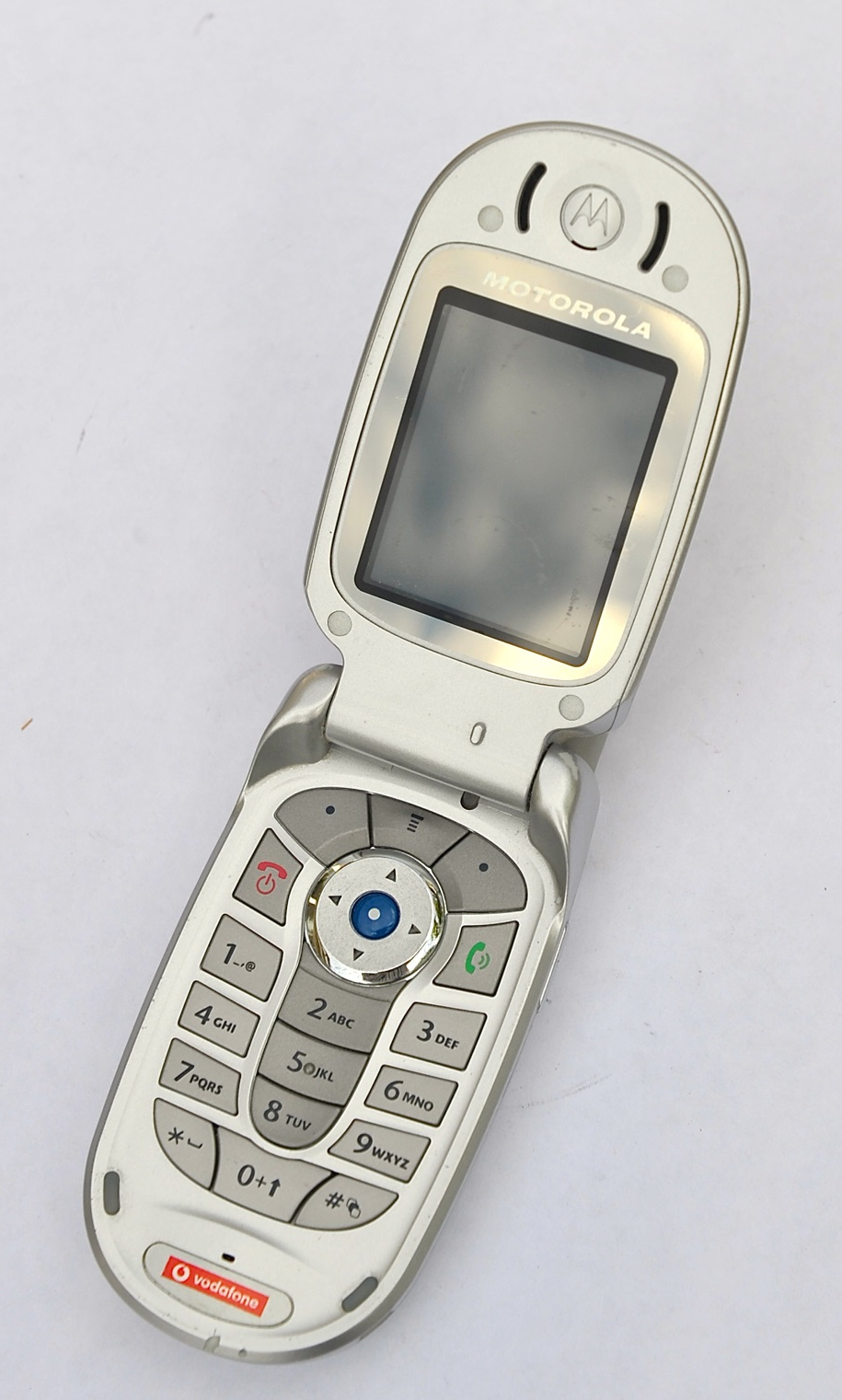
- A Motorola V550 shown unfolded
- Developer: Motorola
- Type: Mobile phone
- Series: V series
- First released: October 2003; 23 years ago
- Predecessor: Motorola T720
- Related: Motorola V600; Motorola V300
- Compatible networks: GSM
- Form factor: Clamshell
- Dimensions: 89 mm (3.5 in) H (folded); 49 mm (1.9 in) W 24.8 mm (0.98 in) D
- Weight: 113 g (4.0 oz) - 124 g (4.4 oz)
- Rear camera: VGA resolution
- Display: 176 x 220 px color TFT LCD
- External display: Yes
- Data inputs: Keypad

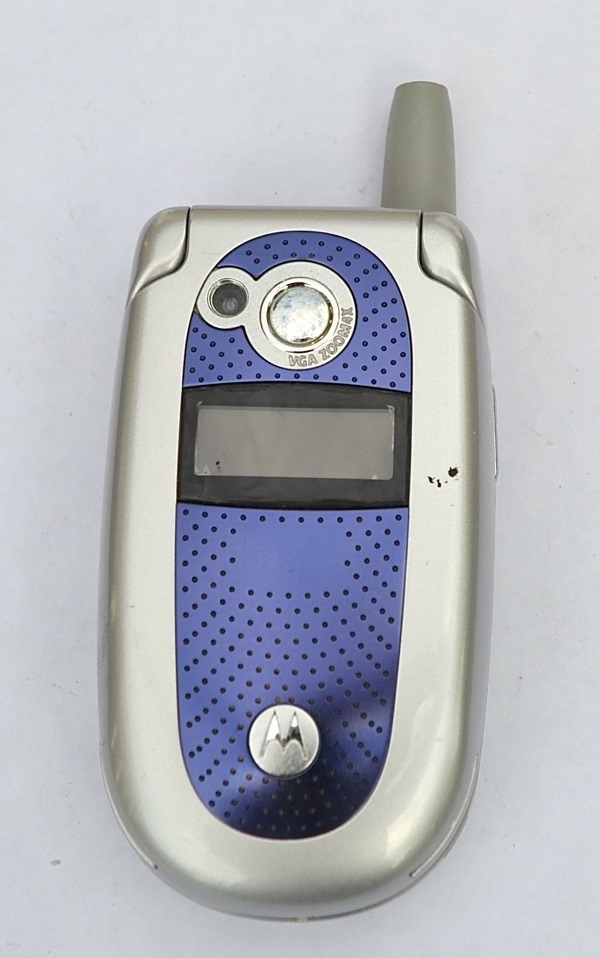
The Motorola V550 closed

Motorola V500 is a GSM clamshell mobile phone made by Motorola, announced in July 2003 and released later that year. It is based on the same platform as the Motorola V600 and also the V300, altogether referred to as the "triplets" - these were the first Motorolas with 65K color displays and their first mainstream handsets with cameras. The V500 sports a blue and silver exterior with a blue-lit exterior display. Many other models were designated as V5xx series that are detailed in this article.

Also, the original Motorola V300 was succeeded by the V330 model in late 2004, which itself was based on an updated V5xx model. There was even a Motorola V400 sold by Cingular with minor differences.

== Features ==
All the Motorola V500 models are quad-band GSM "world phones" and feature a 0.3 megapixel digital camera with 4X digital zoom, Bluetooth wireless technology, MP3 playing capabilities, built-in Speakerphones, SMS, MMS and EMS 5.0, voice-activated dialling, and Java ME games (Stuntman and Monopoly are embedded whereas other games are downloadable).

=== Differences with V600 and V300 ===
The Motorola V500 was a step lower from the flagship V600. Compared to it, the V500 does not have a metal faceplate, external lights, and lacks video playback capability. Compared to the lower V300, the V500 models feature Bluetooth and are quad-band GSM so can be used globally. The Cingular network in the US also had an exclusive midway model called V400 that was quad-band but without Bluetooth.

== Models ==
Motorola V500 is the original model. Motorola V525 is a Vodafone network branded version that runs the Vodafone live! interface software instead of Motorola's. Motorola V501 and V505 are other designated variants.

Motorola V535 (introduced October 2004) is an upgraded model that adds a videocamera and video playback. Branded network operator versions were released as V550, E550 and V545, for Vodafone, T-Mobile and Orange, respectively.

Motorola V547, also known as V551 in North America, V555, or V330, is an upgraded model with videocamera that also supports EDGE for faster data speeds.

Motorola V557 is an upgrade to V551, distinguishable with a black colored exterior instead of blue. It has an improved (256K color) display, 'Screen3' technology, and a feature called 'Live Ticker' that automatically downloads news headlines. It was released on Cingular in November 2005. Motorola V540 is a variant without a camera.

== Specifications (V500/V525 specific) ==
- Form factor: Clam
- Internal memory 5 MB
- Colour: Silver
- Dimensions (h × w × d): 89 × 49 × 24.8 mm
- Volume: 86 cm³
- Weight including the battery: 123 g
- Weight excluding the battery: 113 g
- Display: Internal: 65k TFT Colour (176 × 220)
  - 4 lines of text and 1 line of icons
- Display: External: 2 line (96 × 32, with blue backlight)
- Bands: Quad Band (900/1800/1900/850 MHz)
- Standard battery: SNN5704 battery min 650 mAh
- Standby time (hours): 120-200
- Talk time (mins): 180-390
- GPRS (2u/4d) AMR
- WAP Browser version 2.0
- Connectivity Bluetooth wireless technology (1.1)/CE Bus
- (USB/Serial)

== See also ==
- Motorola V600
- Motorola V360
- Motorola V710 (CDMA)
