= Motorola V600 =

Flip phone by Motorola released in 2004

Motorola V600 / V620 / V635
- Developer: Motorola
- Type: Mobile phone
- Series: V600
- First released: January 2004; 22 years ago
- Predecessor: Motorola V60
- Successor: Motorola V620 > Motorola V635; Motorola RAZR V3
- Related: Motorola V500; Motorola V525; Motorola V300
- Compatible networks: GSM
- Form factor: Clamshell
- Dimensions: 88 mm (3.5 in) H (folded); 48 mm (1.9 in) W 24 mm (0.94 in) D
- Weight: 115 g (4.1 oz) (V600/V620); 124 g (4.4 oz) (V635)
- Rear camera: VGA resolution
- Display: 176 x 220 px color TFT LCD
- External display: Yes
- Data inputs: Keypad

Motorola V600 is a clamshell mobile phone made by Motorola, the company's flagship GSM handset for 2004, and designed as the successor of Motorola V60. The V600 is a quad-band "world phone", operating on GSM/GPRS bands 850/900/1800/1900. The direct successor was the Motorola V620 and then V635, with some improvements, until being majorly succeeded by the functionally identical Motorola V3 (RAZR).

The Motorola V600 has an integrated camera (VGA resolution), color display (65,000 colors), polyphonic ringtones and Bluetooth connectivity. It was finished in a metal-clad aluminium designed exterior that was considered stylish much like its predecessor. On the exterior, the V600 has a translucent cover in light blue under which is the monochrome second display.

The V600 was positively received despite its delayed release. It became, alongside the other two models of Motorola's "triplets" - Motorola V500 and Motorola V300 - among the top-selling GSM phones in the US in the first quarter of 2004, boosting the company's net income and global market share. The V600 along with the other two aforementioned models also gained popularity in European markets.

== History and marketing ==
Motorola V600 was announced at the 2003 Consumer Electronics Show and was expected for a release in the second half of the year. It was developed along with two other similar but lower models, Motorola V500 and Motorola V300, collectively referred to as the "triplets". Because Motorola's operating profit had been significantly less than market leader Nokia, the company designed these phones along with others differently by trimming costs. The "triplets" are almost identical and have many common parts.

The V600 was the first ever quad-band cell phone to be announced, being able to operate on GSM bands 850, 900, 1800 and 1900 MHz, meaning that it could be used anywhere in the world apart from Japan.

The Motorola V600 was hyped and became a much anticipated product, however its release was delayed because of cited software problems and it missed the crucial Christmas period. The V600 was also expected to be the breakthrough media cell phone for Motorola during the trend of camera phones, so missing the expected release was bad for the firm and wrapped up what had been a difficult year.

In October 2003, Motorola announced a special, limited edition of 1,000 units of the Motorola V600 with custom front and rear anodised metal covers in a tie-in with luxury carmaker Aston Martin.

At the 2004 CES show, Motorola announced availability of the V600 and signalled that it would be as big a product as the preceding V60 and the StarTAC. It was finally released in January 2004 in Europe, on February 24 in Taiwan, and suffered another delay in the US until it was released at the end of March 2004, carried by T-Mobile, AT&T Wireless and Cingular.

Considered stylish, Motorola gave out the V600 to nominees of the Oscars held on February 29, 2004.

For CDMA networks, Motorola's flagship of the time was the Motorola V810.

== V620 ==
The Motorola V620 is an updated version of Motorola's flagship V600 world phone, containing such new features as video recording, menu themes and a black housing, and superior 262k color screen (as opposed to 65k). However, the phone lacks a megapixel camera (it is equipped with the same VGA camera), a popular feature of then modern high-end models. Additionally, the V620 only has approximately 5.5 MB of onboard memory, and lacks a TransFlash card slot to expand it. The phone also lacks a CSTN external screen, instead featuring a small inverted-color display. The Motorola V620 was not offered through any U.S. carrier, but was popular in other GSM territories.

The V620 was also the base for the Motorola Razr V3 announced later in 2004.

== V635 ==
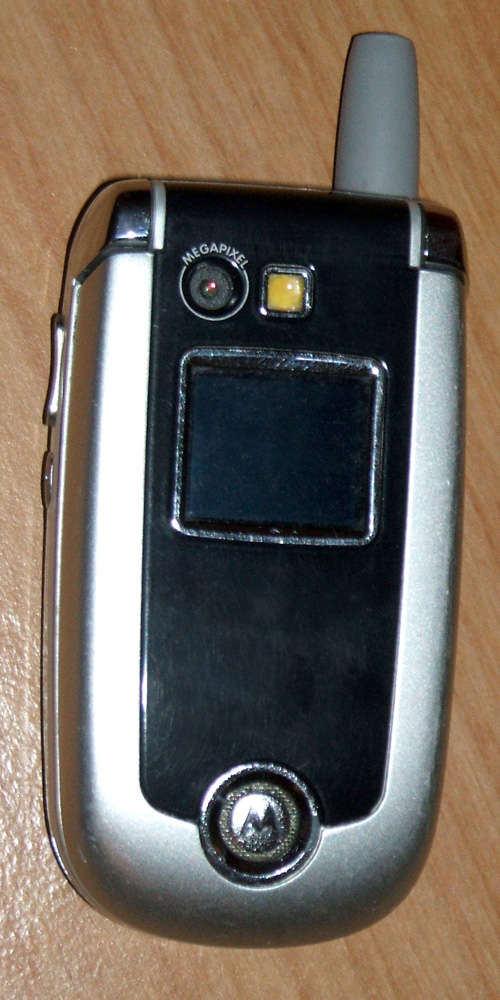
V635

The Motorola V635 is considered the successor to the V600 and V620 model phones. Its prominent features include the ability to insert a removable TransFlash memory card, (fully accessible through the Bluetooth) video capture and playback, 1.23-megapixel camera, and a colored external TFT display. It also adds EDGE for faster data. The phone was announced at the CES 2005 show. Its functions and software is the same as the Razr V3.

The phone was primarily unavailable in United States, as major US carriers did not offer the phone to their subscribers. It was, however, available from Rogers Wireless in Canada.

== See also ==
- Motorola V500 and V300 - sibling model series
- Motorola Razr V3 - successor flagship
- Motorola V710 - CDMA phone
- Motorola V975 - 3G phone for Eurasia
