= List of Komi Can't Communicate chapters =

Komi Can't Communicate is a manga series written and illustrated by Tomohito Oda. The series follows high school student Shoko Komi, who is suffering from a crippling social anxiety disorder, on her quest to make 100 friends with the help of her classmate Hitohito Tadano.

Before its serialization, a one-shot chapter was published in Shogakukan's Weekly Shōnen Sunday on September 16, 2015; the series was later serialized in the same magazine from May 18, 2016, to January 29, 2025. Shogakukan collected its chapters in 37 tankōbon volumes, released from September 16, 2016, to March 18, 2025.

In November 2018, during their panel at Anime NYC, Viz Media announced that they acquired the license for the manga. The first volume was released in North America on June 11, 2019. The manga is licensed in Southeast Asia by Shogakukan Asia.

== Volumes ==
The chapters are labeled as komyu (コミュ) in Japanese and as "Communications" in the English translation.

No.	Original release date	Original ISBN	English release date	English ISBN
1	September 16, 2016	978-4-09-127343-7	June 11, 2019	978-1-9747-0712-6
1. "Totally Normal" (普通の人です。, Futsuu no hito desu); 2. "Peaceful" (平穏です。, Heion desu); 3. "A Suspicious Individual" (曲者です。, Kuse mono desu); 4. "Not very good" (苦手です。, Nigate desu); 5. "Wanting to Talk" (喋りたいです。, Shaberitain desu); 6. "Wanting to Apologize" (謝りたいんです。, Ayamaritain desu); 7. "One More Time" (もう一回です。, Mou ikkai desu); 8. "Scary" (怖い…です。, Kowai… desu); 9. "Old Friends" (幼馴染です。, Osana najimi desu); 10. "Dark Past" (黒歴史です。, Kuro rekishi desu); 11. "Not a Killer" (殺し屋じゃないです。, Koroshiya janai desu); 12. "Errand Girl" (パシリです。, Pashiri desu); 13. "First Errand" (はじめてのおつかいです。, Hajimete no otsukai desu); 14. "Nervous" (あがり症です。, Agari shou desu); 15. "Going to School" (登校です。, Toukou desu); 16. "Cell Phone" (携帯電話です。, Keitai denwa desu); 17. "Class Council Election" (委員会議めです。, Iinkai gime desu); 18. "Accidental Phone Call" (間違い電話です。, Machigai denwa desu); 19. "Saito" (斉藤さんです。, Saitousan desu); Bonus
On his first day at Itan High School, Hitohito Tadano encounters the beautiful but somewhat scary Shouko Komi, who sits next to him, incites the other students' jealousy due to Komi's refined demeanor. That day, Tadano figures out that she suffers from a social anxiety disorder, making her afraid to talk to anyone. However, he notices Komi's ability communicate in writing. Komi confesses she never had any friends, but would like to make 100 in high school. Tadano offers to be her first friend and help her to achieve her dream. Though initial attempts to find friends for Komi fail, he resorts to ask his old childhood acquaintance Najimi Osana, a gifted online personality, to befriend Komi. Najimi declines at first, but when Komi's demeanor scares off some unwanted suitors of Najimi, she ultimately becomes Komi's friend. To have her practice social interactions, Najimi sends off Komi to buy a complicated order from a nearby café, though she does express the order correctly to the barista, who prepares something different. After seeing Komi brought to tears by that experience, Tadano and Najimi apologize to her. Komi befriends Himiko Agari, another classmate initially intimidated by Komi's demeanor. Komi's father buys her a flip phone after having no communications before, without friends to call. She asks Tadano, Najimi, and Agari to give her their phone number. When Komi is elected class president against her will, Najimi suggests she deserves higher. Komi is elected class god, and Tadano becomes class president. Komi accidentally calls Tadano but immediately hangs up when he replies. Tadano calls her back and manages to have a short conversation with Komi on phone. During break, Komi observes the popular students playing games and Najimi manages to help her and Tadano participate. Since they admire Komi, the others let her win the games. During a game where the loser has to make an embarrassing face, Tadano loses deliberately to spare Komi, making him even more unpopular with the other students, receiving thanks from Komi.
2	December 16, 2016	978-4-09-127426-7	August 13, 2019	978-1-9747-0713-3
20. "The Physical" (身体検査です。, Shintai kensa desu); 21. "Fitness Test" (体力測定です。, Tairyoku sokutei desu); 22. "Home Visit" (家庭訪問です。, Katei houmon desu); 23. "Ren" (恋です。, Ren desu); 24. "Ren, Part 2" (恋です。2, Ren desu 2); 25. "Ren, Part 3" (恋です。3, Ren desu 3); 26. "Ren, Part 4" (恋です。4, Ren desu 4); 27. "Summer Uniform" (夏服です。, Natsufuku desu); 28. "Soft Noodles, No Grease, Easy on the Ginger and Veggies" (ヤサイニンニクアブラマシマシカラメです。, Yasai ninniku abura mashi mashi karame desu); 29. "Jokes" (ギャグです。, Gyagu desu); 30. "Rain" (雨です。, Ame desu); 31. "Blood Contract" (血の契約です。, Chi no keiyaku desu); 32. "Tadano in Junior High School" (只野くんの中学時代です。, Tadanokun no chuugaku jidai desu); 33. "Shopping" (お買い物です。, Okaimono desu); 34. "Beauty Salon" (美容室です。, Biyou shitsu desu); Bonus
The first year high school students have their annual physical examination. Classmate Makeru Yadano decides to compete with Komi for the best results where she loses in most categories. The competition between Makeru and Komi continues during the fitness test, while the latter is still unaware. Makeru wishes to forfeit, but when Komi does not shake hands, Makeru thinks that Komi does not want to accept her concession. Makeru decides to become Komi's competitor. Najimi invites them and Tadano to visit Komi's house after school, meeting Komi's mother Shuuko, who resembles her daughter but has a very outgoing personality. Ren Yamai, one of the popular girls in Komi's class, is obsessed with Komi and deeply in love with her. Yamai kidnaps and threatens Tadano seeing him as a competitor for Komi's affection. Yamai invites them to her home to befriend Komi, and upon seeing Tadano bound to Yamai's closet, Komi rejects Yamai's friendship. She asks Tadano whether he still wants to be her friend after what has happened to him. Najimi convinces Yamai to apologize to Komi in which, Komi accepts the apology and befriends Yamai. Tadano, Najimi, and Agari accompany Komi to eat ramen, where Komi instinctively follows all the unwritten rules, gaining the chef's respect. Komi offers to share her umbrella with Tadano on their way home. Omoharu Nakanaka, a Chūnibyō in Komi's class tries to befriend Komi by pretending to know her from another life in a fantasy world. She is confused when Nakanaka runs off before they can form a "blood contract". Nakanaka is left without a partner during stretching exercises in PE, so Komi befriends her. Najimi reveals Tadano's embarrassing past in junior high school. The group shop for clothes, picking different outfits for Komi, before she ultimately chooses a dress Tadano picked for her. Komi visits a beauty salon. Trainee Kamiko Arai becomes frustrated by Komi's silence, though Maki Karisu is able to communicate with Komi without words. Komi expresses her thanks to Kamiko on leaving to her delight.
3	March 17, 2017	978-4-09-127509-7	October 8, 2019	978-1-9747-0714-0
35. "Worries" (モヤモヤです。, Moya moya desu); 36. "Studying for Tests" (テスト勉強です。, Tesuto benkyou desu); 37. "Summer Vacation" (夏休みです。, Natsuyasumi desu); 38. "Meeting up" (待ち合わせです。, Machi awase desu); 39. "The Pool" (プールです。, Puuru desu); 40. "Just a Scrape" (擦りじいただけです。, Surijiitadake desu); 41. "The Library" (図書館です。, Toshokan desu); 42. "Shaved Ice" (かき氷です。, Kakigoori desu); 43. "Part-Time Job" (アルバイトです。, Arubaito desu); 44. "The Park" (公園です。, Kouen desu); 45. "Celebrating Obon" (お盆です。, Obon desu); 46. "Festival" (お祭りですです。, Omatsuri desu); 47. "Festival, Part 2" (お祭りですです。2, Omatsuri desu 2); Bonus
4	June 16, 2017	978-4-09-127575-2	December 10, 2019	978-1-9747-0715-7
48. "Video Games" (テレビゲームです。, Terebi geemu desu); 49. "A Hot Day" (暑い日です。, Atsui hi desu); 50. "Summer Vacation is Over" (夏休みも終わりです。, Natsuyasumi mo owari desu); 51. "A Country Girl" (田舎の子です。, Inaka no ko desu); 52. "Something on Your Face" (顔にゴミがついてます…です。, Kao ni gomi ga tsuitemasu… desu); 53. "First Names" (名前です。, Namae desu); 54. "Sports Festival, Part 1" (体育祭前編です。, Taiikusai zenpen desu); 55. "Sports Festival, Part 2" (体育祭後編です。, Taiikusai kouhen desu); 56. "Feelings" (気持ちです。, Kimochi desu); 57. "Purikura" (プリクラです。, Purikura desu); Bonus
5	July 18, 2017	978-4-09-127664-3	February 11, 2020	978-1-9747-0716-4
58. "Emotional Pangs" (ちょっと苦しいような気持ちです。, Chotto kurushii youna kimochi desu); 59. "Typhoon" (台風です。, Taifuu desu); 60. "The Weather Clears" (台風一過です。, Taifuu ikka desu); 61. "Everyone Gets Gourmet" (みんなでグルメです。, Minna gurume desu); 62. "Culture Festival Project" (文化祭の出し物です。, Bunkasai no dashimono desu); 63. "Accompaniment" (連れ添いです。, Tsuresoi desu); 64. "Culture Festival Prep" (文化祭準備です。, Bunkasai junbi desu); 65. "Distributing Flyers" (チラシ配りです。, Chirashi kubari desu); 66. "Culture Festival Eve" (文化祭前日です。, Bunkasai zenshitsu desu); 67. "Maids" (メイドです。, Meido desu); 68. "Tadano's a Maid Too" (只野くんもメイドです。, Tadanokun mo meido desu); 69. "Najimi's Maid Cafe" (なじみちゃんのメイドカフェです。, Najimichan no meido kafe desu); 70. "Culture Festival, Part 1" (文化祭です。, Bunkasai desu); 71. "Culture Festival, Part 2" (文化祭です。2, Bunkasai desu2); 72. "The After-Party" (後夜祭です。, Kouyasai desu); Bonus
6	October 18, 2017	978-4-09-127856-2	April 14, 2020	978-1-9747-0717-1
73. "After-Party" (打ち上げです。, Uchiage desu); 74. "Shopping with Dad" (お父さんとお買い物です。, Otousan to okaimono desu); 75. "Fantasies, Part 1" (妄想です。, Mousou desu); 76. "Delinquent" (不良です。, Furyou desu); 77. "Fantasies, Part 2" (妄想です。2, Mousou desu2); 78. "Winter Arrives" (冬の訪れです。, Fuyu no otozure desu); 79. "Studying at Nakanaka's House" (中々さんちで勉強です。, Nakanakasanchi de benkyou desu); 80. "Invitation to Lunch" (お昼のお誘いです。, Ohiru no osasoi desu); 81. "Cat Cafe" (猫カフェです。, Neko kafe desu); 82. "Final Exam" (瑣末テストです。, Samatsu tesuto desu); 83. "The Love Game" (愛してるゲームです。, Ai shiteru geemu desu); 84. "Roasted Potatoes" (石焼き芋です。, Ishi yakiimo desu); 85. "Memories of the Culture Festival" (文化祭の思い出です。, Bunkasai no omoide desu); Bonus
7	December 18, 2017	978-4-09-127885-2	June 9, 2020	978-1-9747-0718-8
86. "Choosing a Present" (プレゼント選びです。, Purezento erabi desu); 87. "Merry Christmas" (メリークリスマス…です。, Merii kurisumasu… desu); 88. "Choosing One More Present" (もう一つのプレゼント選びです。, Mou itotsu purezento erabi desu); 89. "Snowmen" (雪だるまです。, Yuki daruma desu); 90. "Snowball Fight" (雪合戦です。, Yuki gassen desu); 91. "Year's End" (年末です。, Nenmatsu desu); 92. "New Year's Day" (元旦です。, Gantan desu); 93. "Shrine Maiden" (巫女さんです。, Mikosan desu); 94. "Various New Year's Holidays" (それぞれの正月です。, Sorezore shougatsu desu); 95. "Ice-Skating" (アイススケートです。, Aisusukeeto desu); 96. "Shopping for Dinner" (晩御飯のお買い物です。, Bangohan no okaimono desu); 97. "Places to Sit" (座る場所です。, Suwaru basho desu); 98. "The King" (王様です。, Oosama desu); 99. "Having a Cold" (風邪です。, Kaze desu); Bonus
8	March 16, 2018	978-4-09-128091-6	August 11, 2020	978-1-9747-0719-5
100. "A Misunderstanding" (誤解です。, Gokai desu); 101. "A Hallucination?" (幻覚です？, Genkaku desu?); 102. "The Narcissist" (ナルシストです。, Narushisuto desu); 103. "Choosing School Trip Groups" (修学旅行の班決めです。, Shuugaku ryokou no han kime desu); 104. "School Trip" (修学旅行です。, Shuugaku ryokou desu); 105. "Tour Guide" (ガイドさんです。, Gaidosan desu); 106. "The Bath" (お風呂です。, Ofuro desu); 107. "Pillow Fight" (まくら投げです。, Makura nage desu); 108. "Free Time" (自由行動です。, Jiyuu koudou desu); 109. "Studio Park" (映画村です。, Eiga mura desu); 110. "The Universe" (宇宙です。, Uchuu desu); 111. "Yo-Yo Hannya" (ヨーヨー般若です。, Yoo Yoo Hannya desu); 112. "The Second Night" (二日目の夜です。, Futsuka me no yoru desu); 113. "The Return Shinkansen" (帰りの新幹線です。, Kaeri no shinkansen desu); Bonus
9	June 18, 2018	978-4-09-128254-5	October 13, 2020	978-1-9747-1740-8
114. "Everyone's Communication" (みんなのコミュニケーションです。, Minna no komyunikeeshion desu); 115. "Erasers, Go!" (消ゴム&ゴーです。, Keshigomu & goo desu); 116. "Valentine's Day Prep" (バレンタインの準備です。, Balentain no junbi desu); 117. "Valentine's Day" (バレンタインです。, Balentain desu); 118. "Valentine's Day, Part 2" (バレンタインです。2, Balentain desu2); 119. "Valentine's Day Aftermath" (バレンタインのあとです。, Balentain no ato desu); 120. "Gotta Run" (伝線です。, Densen desu); 121. "Quelling the Demon" (鬼に金棒です。, Oni ni kanabou desu); 122. "Helpful" (甘いです。, Amai desu); 123. "Lip Balm" (リップクリームです。, Rippu kuriimu desu); 124. "Quarrel" (ケンカです。, Kenka desu); 125. "Mom (17) and Dad (17)" (お父さん（17）とお母さん（17）です。, Otousan (17) to okaasan (17) desu); 126. "Chocolate and Friends" (友達チョコです。, Tomodachi choko desu); 127. "Friday the 13th" (13日の金曜日です。, 13nichi no kinyoubi desu); 128. "White Day" (ホイとデーです。, Hoitodee desu); Bonus
10	September 18, 2018	978-4-09-128390-0	December 8, 2020	978-1-9747-1741-5
129. "One Year" (一年間です。, Ichi nen kan desu); 130. "New Class" (新しいクラスです。, Atarashii kurasu desu); 131. "Gyaru" (ギャルです。, Gyaru desu); 132. "Me too" (私も同じです。, Watashi mo onaji desu); 133. "Shosuke" (古見くんです。, Komikun desu); 134. "Manbagi Again" (マンバ再びです。, Manba futatabi desu); 135. "Manbagi and Tadano" (万場木さんと只野くんです。, Manbagisan to Tadanokun desu); 136. "Makeup" (メイクです。, Meiku desu); 137. "Fitness Test, Part 2" (体力測定です。2, Tairyoku sokutei desu2); 138. "Allergies" (花粉症です。, Kafunshou desu); 139. "Suddenly" (突然です。, Tozzen desu); 140. "Manbagi's Friends" (万場木さんの友達です。, Manbagisan no tomodachi desu); 141. "Bug" (虫です。, Mushi desu); 142. "Sleepover" (お泊まり会です。, Otomarikai desu); Bonus
11	December 18, 2018	978-4-09-128590-4	February 9, 2021	978-1-9747-1882-5
143. "Athletic" (アスレシックです。, Asureshikku desu); 144. "Stars" (星です。, Hoshi desu); 145. "Soccer" (サッカーです。, Sakkaa desu); 146. "Delinquent, Part 2" (不良です。2, Furyou desu2); 147. "Delinquent, Part 3" (不良です。3, Furyou desu3); 148. "Delinquent, Part 4" (不良です。4, Furyou desu4); 149. "Kato's House" (加藤さんの家です。, Katousan no ie desu); 150. "Summer Uniform Grand Prix?" (夏服グランプリ？です。, Natsufuku guran puri? desu); 151. "Sweat" (汗です。, Ase desu); 152. "Wolf" (狼です。, Ookami desu); 153. "Mom and Dad Confess Their Feelings" (母と父の告白です。, Haha to chichi no kokuhaku desu); 154. "Nakanaka's Story" (中々さんのお話です。, Nakanakasan no ohanashi desu); 155. "Backward Flip" (逆上がりです。, Saka agari desu); 156. "Rainy Season" (梅雨です。, Tsuyu desu); 157. "Rainy Season, Part 2" (梅雨です。2, Tsuyu desu2); Bonus
12	March 18, 2019	978-4-09-128802-8	April 13, 2021	978-1-9747-1884-9
158. "Teacher" (先生です。, Sensei desu); 159. "Quite While Studying in the Library, Round 4" (第四回絶対にうるさくしてはいけないテスト勉強です。, Daiyonkai zettai ni urusaku shite ha ikenai testo benkyou desu); 160. "To-Do List" (やりたいことリストです。, Yaritai koto risuto desu); 161. "Cherry Tomatoes" (プチトマトです。, Puchi tomato desu); 162. "The Invitation" (お誘いです。, Osasoi desu); 163. "Swimsuit Shopping" (水着選びです。, Mizugi erabi desu); 164. "The Ocean!" (海！です。, Umi! desu); 165. "My Boyfriend" (彼氏です。, Kareshi desu); 166. "Mom and Dad at the Beach" (母と父の海です。, Haha to chichi no umi desu); 167. "Radio Exercises" (ラジオ体操です。, Rajio taisou desu); 168. "Hot Milk" (ホットミルクです。, Hotto miruku desu); 169. "Playing with Dolls" (お人形遊びです。, Oningyou asobi desu); 170. "WcDonald's" (ワックです。, Wakku desu); Bonus
13	June 18, 2019	978-4-09-129166-0	June 8, 2021	978-1-9747-1883-2
171. "While Mother Is Out" (母のいない日です。, Haha no inai hi desu); 172. "Rei" (澪ちゃんです。, Reichan desu); 173. "Following Rei" (澪ちゃんの追跡です。, Reichan no tsuiseki desu); 174. "Nakanaka's Grand Summer Day" (中々さんの華麗なる夏の一日です。, Nakanakasan no kareinareru natsu no ichinichi desu); 175. "Four-Leaf Clover" (四つ葉です。, Yotsuba desu); 176. "A Bath with Rei" (澪ちゃんとお風呂です。, Reichan to ofuro desu); 177. "Saying Goodbye to Rei" (澪ちゃんとお別れです。, Reichan to owakare desu); 178. "Summer Rendevouz" (夏の逢瀬です。, Natsu no ouse desu); 179. "The Fearsome Katai Clan" (恐怖！片居家の一族！です。, Kyoufu! Kataike no ichizoku! desu); 180. "Test of Courage, Part 1" (肝試しです。, Kimodameshi desu); 181. "Test of Courage, Part 2" (肝試しです。2, Kimodameshi desu2); Bonus
14	August 16, 2019	978-4-09-129329-9	August 10, 2021	978-1-9747-1886-3
182. "Hard-Core" (硬派です。, Kouha desu); 183. "Bus Trip" (高速バスです。, Kousoku basu desu); 184. "Playing in the Country" (田舎遊びです。, Inaka asobi desu); 185. "Obaka Sumo" (オオバカ相撲です。, Oobaka sumou desu); 186. "Everyone's Obon" (それぞれのお盆です。, Sorezore no obon desu); 187. "Bicycle Lesson" (自転車の練習です。, Jitensha no renshuu desu); 188. "The Class 2-1 Social" (2年1組懇親会です。, 2 nen 1 kumi konshinkai desu); 189. "After the Test of Courage" (肝試しその後です。, Kimodameshi no sonogo desu); 190. "Sparklers" (線香花火です。, Senkou hanabi desu); 191. "Mosquitoes" (蚊です。, Ka desu); 192. "The Riverside Magazine Hunters Club" (河川敷、本探し部です。, Kasenjiki, hon sagishibu desu); 193. "Food Stand" (屋台です。, Yatai desu); 194. "Fireworks" (花火です。, Hanabi desu); 195. "Three Parties" (3人です。, 3 nin desu); Bonus
15	November 18, 2019	978-4-09-129441-8	October 12, 2021	978-1-9747-1885-6
196. "Clean" (清潔です。, Seiketsu desu); 197. "Twister Game" (ツイスターゲムです。, Tsuisutaa gemu desu); 198. "Out & Law – The Movie" (OUT & LAW 〜 The Movie 〜 です。, Out & Law ~ The Movie ~ desu); 199. "Hit and Cover Rock Paper Scissors" (たたいてかぶってじゃんけんぽんです。, Tataite kabutte jankenpon desu); 200. "The Student Council" (生徒会です。, Seitokai desu); 201. "Smile" (笑顔です。, Egao desu); 202. "Election Manager" (応援代表です。, Ouendaihyou desu); 203. "Election Manager 2" (応援代表です。2, Ouendaihyou desu2); 204. "Height" (身長です。, Shinchou desu); 205. "Height 2" (身長です。2, Shinchou desu2); 206. "Love" (恋心です。, Koigokoro desu); 207. "Banquet" (晩餐会です。, Bansankai desu); Bonus
16	February 18, 2020	978-4-09-129555-2	December 14, 2021	978-1-9747-2454-3
208. "Second Year Sports Festival" (2年の体育祭です。, 2 nen no taiikusai desu); 209. "Second Year Sports Festival 2" (2年の体育祭です。2, 2 nen no taiikusai desu2); 210. "Say aah…" (あーんです。, Aan desu); 211. "Water" (水です。, Mizu desu); 212. "Second Year Sports Festival 3" (2年の体育祭です。3, 2 nen no taiikusai desu3); 213. "Pat Pat" (ポンポンです。, Ponpon desu); 214. "A Bike Outing" (自転車でお出かけです。, Jitensha de odekake desu); 215. "A Father-Son Day (父と息子の一日です。, Chichi to musuko no ichinichi desu); 216. "Emotional" (エモーショナルです。, Emooshonaru desu); 217. "Goldfish" (金魚です。, Kingyo desu); 218. "Mom and Dad's Kiss" (父と母のチューです。, Chichi to haha no chuu desu); 219. "Winter Clothes" (冬服です。, Fuyufuku desu); 220. "Winter Clothes 2" (冬服です。2, Fuyufuku desu2); 221. "Practice of the Culture Festival" (文化祭の練習です。, Bunkasai no renshuu desu); 222. "Culture Festival Arrangements" (文化祭の予定です。, Bunkasai no yotei desu); 223. "First Day of the Culture Festival" (文化祭一日目です。, Bunkasai ichinichi me desu2); Bonus
17	May 18, 2020	978-4-09-850072-7	February 8, 2022	978-1-9747-2455-0
224. "Wig" (カツラです, Katsura desu); 225. "Feeling Okay" (だいじょうぶです, Daijōbu desu); 226. "You Matter" (どうでもよくないです, Dō demo yokunai desu); 227. "No Surprise at All" (当然です, Tōzen desu); 228. "Out of the Question" (ダメです, Dame desu); 229. "The FBI" (FBIです, FBI desu); 230. "Performance" (当然です, Engeki desu); 231. "Invitation" (お誘いです, Osaisoi desu); 232. "Secret" (ナイショです, Naisho desu); 233. "Culture Festival Date" (文化祭デートです, Bunkasai dēto desu); 234. "Closing Party for Two" (二人の後夜祭です, Futari no goya-sau desu); Bonus
18	September 18, 2020	978-4-09-850178-6	April 12, 2022	978-1-9747-2456-7
235. "The Band" (バンドです, Bando desu); 236. "Outside the After-party" (打ち上げの外です, Uchiage no soto desu); 237. "Making a Play" (アピールですです, Apīru desu); 238. "Culture Festival Reflections" (文化祭の振り返りです, Bunkasai no furikaeri desu); 239. "Rice Balls and Miso Soup" (おにぎりと味噌汁です, Onigiri to misoshiru desu); 240. "Technique" (テクニックです, Tekunikku desu); 241. "The Escape" (脱出です, Dasshutsu desu); 242. "No Good" (ヘタです, Heta desu); 243. "Dad and Mom Kiss, Part 2" (父と母のチューです2, Chichi to haha no chū desu); 244. "Young Brother's Culture Festival" (弟の文化祭です, Otōto no bunkasai desu); 245. "Lateral Thinking in Love Talk" (水平思考恋バナです, Suihei shikō koi bana desu); 246. "PE Storage" (体育倉庫です, Taiiku sōko desu); Bonus
19	November 18, 2020	978-4-09-850277-6	June 14, 2022	978-1-9747-3102-2
247. "Out of Sync" (すれ通いです, Suregayoi desu); 248. "Ear Takeaway" (耳持ってかれるです, Mimi motte kaeru desu); 249. "Skipping" (スキップです, Sukippu desu); 250. "Fantasies, Part 3" (妄想です3, Mōsō desu 3); 251. "Singles Meeting?" (合コン？です, Gōkon? desu); 252. "Singles Meeting?, Part 2" (合コン？です 2, Gōkon? desu 2); 253. "Singles Meeting?, Part 3" (合コン？です 3, Gōkon? desu 3); 254. "Fantasies, Part 4" (妄想です 4, Mōsō desu 4); 255. "Hand Warmers" (カイロです, Kairo desu); 256. "Four-Way Talks" (四者面談です, Yonsha mendan desu); 257. "Sleepover Study Session" (お泊まり勉強会です, O tomari benkyō-kai desu); 258. "Contact Info" (連絡先です, Renrakusen desu); Bonus
20	February 18, 2021	978-4-09-850389-6	August 9, 2022	978-1-9747-3103-9
259. "Reciprocating" (プレゼントのお返しです, Purezento no okaeshi desu); 260. "Can't Sleep" (眠れないです, Nemurenai desu); 261. "Snowboarding" (スノーボードです, Sunōbōdo desu); 262. "Snowboarding, Part 2" (スノーボードです 2, Sunōbōdo desu 2); 263. "Inn" (旅館です, Ryokan desu); 264. "Inn, Part 2" (旅館です 2, Ryokan desu 2); 265. "Follow-Up Girls' Convo" (帰宅後女子会です, Kitaku-go joshikai desu); 266. "Dad and Mom Go Skiing" (父と母のスキーです, Chichi to haha no sukī desu); 267. "Crab" (蟹です, Kani desu); 268. "Ski Conversations" (スキーよもやま語です, Sukī yomoyamago desu); 269. "Sleep Talking" (寝言です, Negoto desu); Bonus
21	May 18, 2021	978-4-09-850529-6	October 11, 2022	978-1-9747-3104-6
270. "Swamp Bros. Tournament" (ヌマブラトーナメントです, Numabura Tōnamento desu); 271. "Annual Consultation" (年末の報告相談です, Nenmatsu no hōkoku desu); 272. "Pounding Rice" (餅つきです, Mochi-tsuki desu); 273. "New Year's Messages" (あけおメッセージです, Ake o messēji desu); 274. "The Try-Not-to-Laugh Challenge" (笑っちゃダメな年末です, Waratcha damena nenmatsu desu); 275. "Holing Up at Home" (引きこもりです, Hiki komori desu); 276. "Winter Weight-Gain Countermeasures" (正月太…ごにょごにょです, Shōgatsu futoshi... go ni yogonyo desu); 277. "Passport" (パスポートです, Pasupōto desu); 278. "Boarding" (搭乗です, Tōjō desu); 279. "America" (アメリカです, Amerika desu); 280. "Elementary School" (エレメンタリースクールです, Erementarī Sukūru desu); 281. "Hamburgers for Lunch" (お昼はハンバーガーです, Ohiru wa hanbāgā desu); 282. "Musical" (ミュージカルです, Myūjikaru desu); 283. "Art Museum" (美術館です, Bijutsukan desu); 284. "Reunion" (再会です, Saikai desu); Bonus
22	August 18, 2021	978-4-09-850644-6	December 13, 2022	978-1-9747-3208-1
285. "Against it but Not Against It" (嫌だけど嫌じゃないです, Iyadakedo iya janai desu); 286. "The Boy's Room" (男子部屋です, Danshi heya desu); 287. "Splitting into Pairs" (班行動です, Han kōdō desu); 288. "Rumiko and Kometani" (留美子ちゃんと米谷くんです, Rumiko-chan to Kometani-kun desu); 289. "Naruse and Ase, Part 1" (成瀬くんと阿瀬さんです, Naruse-kun to Ase-san desu); 290. "Naruse and Ase, Part 2" (成瀬くんと阿瀬さんです 2, Naruse-kun to Ase-san desu 2); 291. "Isagi and I" (潔さんと私です, Isagi-san to watashi desu); 292. "School-Trip Happenings" (それぞれの修学旅行です, Sorezore no shūgakuryokō desu); 293. "Look at Me" (こっち向いて。です, Kotchimuite. desu); 294. "I'm Sorry Too" (私もごめん。です, Watashi mo gomen. desu); 295. "Returning Home" (帰国です, Kikoku desu); 296. "Blind Man's Bluff" (インディアンポーカーです, Indian Pōkā desu); 297. "Class Trip" (学年旅行です, Gakunen ryokō desu); 298. "School" (学校です, Gakkō desu); Bonus
23	October 18, 2021	978-4-09-850720-7	February 14, 2023	978-1-9747-3401-6
299. "Valentine's Day, Year Two" (2年のバレンタインです, 2-nen no Barentain desu); 300. "Confession, Part 1" (告白です, Kokuhaku desu); 301. "Confession, Part 2" (告白です 2, Kokuhaku desu 2); 302. "Confession, Part 3" (告白です 3, Kokuhaku desu 3); 303. "Confession, Part 4" (告白です 4, Kokuhaku desu 4); 304. "The Day After the Confession, Part 1" (告白の次の日です, Kokuhaku no tsugu no hi desu); 305. "The Day After the Confession, Part 2" (告白の次の日です 2, Kokuhaku no tsugi no hi desu 2); 306. "The Reaction" (リアクションです, Riakushon desu); 307. "A Discussion After the Confession" (告白の後日談です, Kokuhaku no gojitsu-dan desu); 308. "Their Eyes Meet, Part 1" (目が合う。です, Megaau. desu); 309. "Their Eyes Meet, Part 2" (目が合う。です 2, Megaau. desu 2); 310. "Their Eyes Meet, Part 3" (目が合う。です 3, Megaau. desu 3); 311. "Their Eyes Meet, Part 4" (目が合う。です 4, Megaau. desu 4); 312. "The Refusal" (認められないです, Mitomerarenai desu); 313. "Sleepover, Part 2" (お泊まり会です 2, O tomari-kai desu 2); Bonus
24	January 18, 2022	978-4-09-850866-2	April 11, 2023	978-1-9747-3679-9
314. "Let's Meet Up Again" (一緒に帰りましょうです。, Issho ni kaerimashou desu); 315. "Congratulations on Graduating" (卒業おめでとうございます。です。, Sotsugyō omedetō gozaimasu. desu); 316. "Everyone's White Day" (それぞれのホワイトデーです。, Sorezore no Howaito Dē desu); 317. "Date (With Dad)" (デート(父と)です。, Dēto (chichi to) desu); 318. "Clothes for the Date" (デート服です。, Dēto-fuku desu); 319. "The Actual Date" (デート本番です。, Dēto honban desu); 320. "The Actual Date, Part 2" (デート本番です。2, Dēto honban desu 2); 321. "The Date from the Sidelines" (デートの裏側です。, Dēto no uragawa desu); 322. "Gravure" (グラビアです。, Gurabia desu); 323. "Second Year Graduation Ceremony" (2年の修了式です。, 2-nen no shūryō-shiki desu); 324. "Third Year" (3年生です。, 3-nensei desu); Bonus
25	April 18, 2022	978-4-09-851058-0	June 13, 2023	978-1-9747-3704-8
325. "Classmates" (クラスメートは…です。, Kurasumēto wa... desu); 326. "School Starts" (入学です。, Nyūgaku desu); 327. "Rumiko in Year 3" (3年の留美子ちゃんです。, 3-nen no Rumiko-chan desu); 328. "Conversation" (会話です。, Kaiwa desu); 329. "Doing Well" (頑張りました。です。, Ganbari mashita. desu); 330. "Battle Royale, Part 1" (バトルロワイヤルです。, Batoru Rowaiyaru desu); 331. "Battle Royale, Part 2" (バトルロワイヤルです。2, Batoru Rowaiyaru desu 2); 332. "Shiina" (椎名さんです。, Shīna-san desu); 333. "Tales from the Battle Royale" (バトルロワイヤルよもやま話です。, Batoru Rowaiyaru yomoyamabanashi desu); 334. "MVP" (MVPです。, MVP desu); 335. "Battle Royale Side Stories" (バトロワこぼれ話です。, Batorowa kobore banashi desu); 336. "Long-Rope Jumping" (大繩跳びです。, Ōnawa tobi desu); Bonus
26	July 15, 2022	978-4-09-851185-3	August 8, 2023	978-1-9747-3888-5
337. "Siberian Nanmen Takamoto" (西比利亜タンメン中素です。, Shiberia tanmen-chū moto desu); 338. "Greetings" (ご挨拶です。, Go aisatsu desu); 339. "Greetings, Part 2" (ご挨拶です。2, Go aisatsu desu 2); 340. "Greetings, Part 3" (ご挨拶です。3, Go aisatsu desu 3); 341. "After Recreation" (レクリエーション後です。, Rekuriēshon-go desu); 342. "Knight" (騎士です。, Kishi desu); 343. "Knight, Part 2" (騎士です。2, Kishi desu 2); 344. "Changing Classes" (クラス替えです。, Kurasu-gae desu); 345. "Wakai" (和貝くんです。, Wagai-kun desu); 346. "Third-Year Fitness Test" (3年の体力測定です。, 3-nen no tairyoku sokutei desu); 347. "Date (?)" (デート(?)です。, Dēto (?) desu); 348. "University Visit" (大学見学です。, Daigaku kengaku desu); 349. "University Visit, Part 2" (大学見学です。2, Daigaku kengaku desu 2); Bonus
27	October 18, 2022	978-4-09-851349-9	October 10, 2023	978-1-9747-4063-5
350. "New Model" (機種変更です。, Kishu henkō desu); 351. "Mountain-Stream Fishing" (渓流釣りです。, Keiryūtsuri desu); 352. "The Players" (参加メンバーです。, Sanka Menbā desu); 353. "The First Casualty" (最初の被害者です。, Saisho no higaisha desu); 354. "The Discussion Begins" (議論開始です。, Giron kaishi desu); 355. "Kemposters" (宇宙拳法家です。, Uchū kenpōka desu); 356. "Amanjite Asu" (甘んじて明日です。, Amanjite ashita desu); 357. "Selfie, Part 2" (自分撮り(後編)です。, Jibundori (kōhen) desu); 358. "Selfie, Part 1" (自分撮り(前編)です。, Jibundori (zenpen) desu); 359. "Ribon" (りぼんちゃんです。, Ribon-chan desu); 360. "Cheering" (応援です。, Ōen desu); 361. "Ase Girls' Convo" (阿瀬さんの女子会です。, Ase-san no onagokai desu); 362. "Kiss" (チューです。, Chū desu); 363. "Kiss (Within Comfortable Bounds)" (ちゅー(無理のない範囲)です。, Chū~yu ̄ (muri no nai han'i) desu); Bonus
28	January 18, 2023	978-4-09-851532-5	January 9, 2024	978-1-9747-4289-9
364. "Sauna" (サウナです。, Sauna desu); 365. "Ripples" (波紋です。, Hamon desu); 366. "Summer Uniform Grand Prix" (夏服グランプリ! です。, Natsufuku Guran Puri! desu); 367. "Young Women's Club" (妙齢女子会です。, Myōrei joshikai desu); 368. "Erm Erm" (モヤモヤです。, Moyamoya desu); 369. "First Friend × 3" (初めての友達×3です。, Hajimete no tomodachi × 3 desu); 370. "Cheering, Part 2" (応援です。2, Ōen desu 2); 371. "Komorebi and Friends Study for Tests" (こもれびちゃんたちのテスト勉強です。, Komorebi-chan tachi no Tesuto benkyō desu); 372. "Quiet While Studying in the Library, Round 9" (第九回絶対にうる。, Daikyūkai zettai ni uru.); 373. "Study Sessions at Home, Part 1" (おうち勉強会です。, Ouchi benkyō-kai desu); 374. "Study Sessions at Home, Part 2" (おうち勉強会です。2, Ouchi benkyō-kai desu 2); 375. "Study Sessions at Home, Part 3" (おうち勉強会です。3, Ouchi benkyō-kai desu 3); 376. "In That Case, Oh Well" (じゃあ、まぁ、いいかぁです。, Jā, mā, īkā desu); Bonus
29	April 18, 2023	978-4-09-852027-5	April 9, 2024	978-1-9747-4371-1
377. "Study Camp, Part 1" (合宿です。, Gasshuku desu); 378. "Tadano in Junior High" (只野くんの中学時代です。2, Tadano-kun no chūgaku jidai desu 2); 379. "Komorebi's Summer Break" (こもれびちゃんの夏休みです。, Komorebi-chan no natsuyasumi desu); 380. "Study Camp, Part 2" (合宿です。2, Gasshuku desu 2); 381. "Study Camp, Part 3" (合宿です。3, Gasshuku desu 3); 382. "Study Camp, Part 4" (合宿です。4, Gasshuku desu 4); 383. "Study Camp, Part 5" (合宿です。5, Gasshuku desu 5); 384. "Study Camp, Part 6" (合宿です。6, Gasshuku desu 6); 385. "Wake-Up Shake-Up" (寝起きドッキリです。, Neoki dokkiri desu); 386. "Final Day of Study Camp, Part 1" (合宿最終日です。, Gasshuku saishūbi desu); 387. "Final Day of Study Camp, Part 2" (合宿最終日です。2, Gasshuku saishūbi desu 2); 388. "Final Day of Study Camp, Part 3" (合宿最終日です。3, Gasshuku saishūbi desu 3); Bonus
30	July 18, 2023	978-4-09-852611-6	July 9, 2024	978-1-9747-4610-1
389. "Kawai, Part 1" (河合さんです。, Kawai-san desu); 390. "Kawai, Part 2" (河合さんです。2, Kawai-san desu 2); 391. "Kawai, Part 3" (河合さんです。3, Kawai-san desu 3); 392. "The Return of Kawai" (河合さんは、です。, Kawai-san wa, desu); 393. "All the Good Stuff That Comes with Marrying Me" (『私と結婚するとこんな良いことが有りますVTR』です。, "Watashi to kekkon suruto kon'na yoi koto ga arimasu VTR" desu); 394. "Riverside Death Game" (河川敷デスゲームです。, Kasenjiki Desu Gēmu desu); 395. "The Attempt" (未遂です。, Misui desu); 396. "Tales from Study Camp" (合宿こぼれ話です。, Gasshuku kobore banashi desu); 397. "American Friend" (アメリカの友達です。, Amerika no tomodachi desu); 398. "My Name Is Kuro" (我が名はクロです。, Waganaha Kuro desu); 399. "Haircut" (散髪です。, Sanpatsu desu); 400. "Year Three Summer Festival, Part 1" (3年目の夏祭りです。, 3-nen-me no natsu matsuri desu); 401. "Year Three Summer Festival, Part 2" (3年目の夏祭りです。2, 3-nen-me no natsu matsuri desu 2); Bonus
31	October 18, 2023	978-4-09-852853-0	October 8, 2024	978-1-9747-4903-4
402. "Kawai's House" (河合さん家です。, Kawai-san desu); 403. "The Buta House" (撫田さんの家です。, Nadeta-san no ie desu); 404. "Tales from the Summer Festival, Part 1" (夏祭りよもやま話です。, Natsu matsuri yomoyamabanashi desu); 405. "Tales from the Summer Festival, Part 2" (夏祭りよもやま話です。2, Natsu matsuri yomoyamabanashi desu 2); 406. "Summer Festival Fantasies" (夏祭りでも妄想です。, Natsu matsuri demo mōsō desu); 407. "Interview" (面接です。, Mensetsu desu); 408. "Always Take Your Little Brother" (持つべきものは弟です。, Motsubeki mono wa otōto desu); 409. "Can't Say Sorry" (ごめんねが言えないです。, Gomen ne ga ienai desu); 410. "Cicadat-rrounded" (セミクローズドサークルです。, Semikurōzudo Sākuru desu); 411. "Summer Festival for Two" (二人で夏祭りです。, Futari de natsu matsuri desu); 412. "The Second Time" (2回目です。, 2-kai me desu); 413. "Makeup" (お化粧です。, O keshō desu); Bonus
32	January 18, 2024	978-4-09-853073-1	January 14, 2025	978-1-9747-5154-9
414. "The Confession of Love That One Time" (あの時の告白です。, Ano toki no kokuhaku desu); 415. "Year Three, Second Term" (3年の2学期です。, 3-nen no 2 gakkidesu); 416. "To Go" (あと…です。, Ato…desu); 417. "Ogiya" (荻谷くんです。, Ogitani-kun desu); 418. "Super Awesome" (すごくすごいです。, Sugoku sugoi desu); 419. "Yamai Has a Cold" (山井さんは風邪です。, Yamai-san wa kaze desu); 420. "I'm the Class Rep" (学級委員長です。, Gakkyū iin-chō desu); 421. "It's Emoyama, Part 1" (江藻山さんです。, Emoyama-san desu); 422. "The Flub-Up" (過ちです。, Ayamachi desu); 423. "Emoi School Dramas" (エモい学園ドラマです。, Emoi gakuen dorama desu); 424. "It's Emoyama, Part 2" (江藻山さんです。2, Emoyama-san desu 2); 425. "Rumiko Tries Not to Laugh" (笑ってはいけない留美子ちゃんです。, Waratte ha ikenai Rumiko-chan desu); 426. "It's Emoyama, Part 3" (江藻山さんです。, Emoyama-san desu); 427. "Cool" (クールです。, Kūru desu); 428. "Confused Feelings" (わかんないけど…です。, Wakan'nai kedo… desu); Bonus
33	April 17, 2024	978-4-09-853220-9	March 11, 2025	978-1-9747-5263-8
429. "Year Three Sports Festival, Part 1" (3年の体育祭です。, 3-nen no taiiku matsuri desu); 430. "Year Three Sports Festival, Part 2" (3年の体育祭です。2, 3-nen no taiiku matsuri desu 2); 431. "Year Three Sports Festival, Part 3" (3年の体育祭です。3, 3-nen no taiiku matsuri desu 3); 432. "Year Three Sports Festival, Part 4" (3年の体育祭です。4, 3-nen no taiiku matsuri desu 4); 433. "A Date with Rumiko" (留美子ちゃんとデートです。, Rumiko-chan to Dēto desu); 434. "The Old Lady Who Is Always on the Street" (いつも道にいるおばあちゃんです。, Itsumo michi ni iru o bāchan desu); 435. "Michita" (満田さんです。, Mitsuda-san desu); 436. "Charm" (お守りです。, Omamori desu); 437. "Group Discussion, Part 1" (グループディスカッションです。, Gurūpu Disukasshon desu); 438. "Group Discussion, Part 2" (グループディスカッションです。2, Gurūpu Disukasshon desu 2); 439. "Group Discussion, Part 3" (グループディスカッションです。3, Gurūpu Disukasshon desu 3); 440. "Side Story" (外伝です。, Gaiden desu); 441. "Group Discussion, Part 4" (グループディスカッションです。, Gurūpu Disukasshon desu 4); 442. "Pizza Party" (ピザパです。, Pizapa desu); Bonus
34	July 18, 2024	978-4-09-853434-0	June 10, 2025	978-1-9747-5571-4
443. "Emotional Support" (心の支えです。, Kokoro no sasae desu); 444. "This is the Venue for the Emergency Girls' Press Conference" (緊急女子記者会見会場はこちらです。, Kinkyū joshi kisha kaiken kaijō wa kochira desu); 445. "Subliminal Chili Shrimp" (エビチリサブリミナルです。, Ebichiri saburiminaru desu); 446. "Yushushin High School Culture Festival" (悠修清学校文化祭です。, Yūshūsei gakkō bunka matsuri desu); 447. "I Wanna Do a Festival Project" (出し物やりたいです。, Dashimono yaritai desu); 448. "Ramen Stand" (出し物はラーメンです。, Dashimono wa rāmen desu); 449. "Ramen Stand, Part 2" (出し物はラーメンです。2, Dashimono wa rāmen desu 2); 450. "Ramen Stand, Part 3" (出し物はラーメンです。3, Dashimono wa rāmen desu 3); 451. "The Day of the Culture Festival" (文化祭本番です。, Bunka matsuri honban desu); 452. "Contrary" (天邪鬼です。, Amanojaku desu); 453. "Cinderella" (シンデレラです。, Shinderera desu); 454. "Dramatic" (ドラマチックです。, Doramachikku desu); 455. "Understanding Everything" (全部わかります。です。, Zenbu wakarimasu. desu); Bonus
35	October 18, 2024	978-4-09-853635-1	September 9, 2025	978-1-9747-5840-1
456. "Good Work at the Culture Festival" (文化祭お疲れ様です。, Bunka matsuri otsukaresama desu); 457. "Culture Festival Closing Ceremony" (文化祭閉会式です。, Bunkamatsuri heikai-shiki desu); 458. "Gathering Friends" (友達集めです。, Tomodachi atsume desu); 459. "Gathering Acorns" (どんぐり集めです。, Donguri atsume desu); 460. "Make-Shosuke-Laugh Attack" (笑わせようの会です。, Warawaseyou no kai desu); 461. "Mizuhara" (水原くんです。, Mizuhara-kun desu); 462. "Shosuke" (笑介くんです。, Shōsuke-kun desu); 463. "Me or Nu" (『め』か『ぬ』です。, "Me" ka "nu" desu); 464. "Ke or Ra" (『け』か『は』です。, "Ke" ka "wa" desu); 465. "Ro or Ru" (『ろ』か『る』です。, "Ro" ka "ru" desu); 466. "Gyo or Nn" (『ぎょ』か『ん゛ん』です。, "Gyo" ka "n ゛n" desu); 467. "Box Lunch" (お弁当です。, O bentō desu); 468. "Girlfriend, Part 1" (彼女です。, Kanojo desu); 469. "Girlfriend, Part 2" (彼女です。 2, Kanojo desu 2); 470. "Girlfriend, Part 3" (彼女です。 3, Kanojo desu 3); 471. "The Wrong Idea" (勘違いです。, Kanchigai desu); 472. "Mock Exam Results" (模試の結果です。, Moshi no kekka desu); 473. "I Want to Touch Your Earrings" (ピアス触らせてください、です。, Piasu sawara sete kudasai, desu); Bonus
36	January 17, 2025	978-4-09-853813-3	December 9, 2025	978-1-9747-5916-3
474. "Studying at Grandma's House, Part 1" (おばあちゃんちで勉強です。, Obāchan chi de benkyō desu); 475. "Studying at Grandma's House, Part 2" (おばあちゃんちで勉強です。 2, Obāchan chi de benkyō desu 2); 476. "Studying at Grandma's House, Part 3" (おばあちゃんちで勉強です。 3, Obāchan chi de benkyō desu 3); 477. "Studying at Grandma's House, Part 4" (おばあちゃんちで勉強です。 4, Obāchan chi de benkyō desu 4); 478. "Studying at Grandma's House, Part 5" (おばあちゃんちで勉強です。 5, Obāchan chi de benkyō desu 5); 479. "Studying at Grandma's House, Akira Attacks" (祖母家勉強会、晶ちゃん襲来です。, Sobo-ka benkyō-kai, Akira-chan shūrai desu.); 480. "Relatives" (親族です。, Shinzoku desu.); 481. "New Year's Eve at Grandma's House" (祖母家で年越しです。, Sobo-ka de toshikoshi desu.); 482. "New Year's Eve" (大晦日の夜です。, Ōmisoka no yoru desu.); 483. "Hatsumode, Shrine Maiden, Safe Birth Charm" (初詣、巫女、安産お守りです。, Hatsumōde, miko, anzan omamori desu.); 484. "Lettuce" (レタスです。, Retasu desu.); 485. "The Niimi Family" (新見家です。, Nīmi-ka desu.); 486. "Mountain Yam Digging" (山芋掘りです。, Yamaimo hori desu.); 487. "The Big Day" (本番です。, Honban desu.); Bonus
37	March 18, 2025	978-4-09-854029-7	March 10, 2026	978-1-9747-6145-6
488. "Hard Worker" (頑張り屋です。, Ganbariya desu.); 489. "Class 1 Driver's License for Standard Vehicles" (普通自動車第一種免許です。, Futsū jidōsha dai isshu menkyo desu.); 490. "Ranked by Size" (大きさランキングです。, Ōki-sa Rankingu desu.); 491. "Letter" (お手紙です。, O tegami desu.); 492. "Finding a Place to Live" (賃貸さがしです。, Chintai sagashi desu.); 493. "Yamai" (山井さんです。, Yamai-san desu.); 494. "Fantasies, Part 5" (妄想です。5, Mōsō desu. 5); 495. "Planning the Graduation Ceremony" (卒業式の準備です。, Sotsugyōshiki no junbi desu.); 496. "Yearbook, Part 1" (卒業アルバムです。, Sotsugyō Arubamu desu.); 497. "Yearbook, Part 2" (卒業アルバムです。2, Sotsugyō Arubamu desu. 2); 498. "My Graduation Ceremony, Part 1" (私の卒業式です。前編。, Watashi no sotsugyōshiki desu. Zenpen.); 499. "My Graduation Ceremony, Part 2" (私の卒業式です。後編, Watashi no sotsugyōshiki desu. Kōhen); 500. "University Student" (大学生です。, Daigakusei desu.)
