= Samsung SGH-A717 =

2007 mobile phone model

Samsung A717
- Brand: Samsung
- Manufacturer: Samsung Electronics
- First released: June 2007
- Availability by region: Discontinued
- Compatible networks: GSM 850 / 900 / 1800 / 1900; HSDPA 850 / 1900
- Form factor: Flip phone
- Dimensions: 104 mm × 54 mm × 12.7 mm (4.09 in × 2.13 in × 0.50 in)
- Weight: 93 g (3.3 oz)
- Memory: 26 MB internal
- Storage: microSD (dedicated slot)
- Battery: Removable Li-Ion 1000 mAh
- Rear camera: 2 MP, autofocus with video recording
- Front camera: No
- Display: Primary: TFT LCD, 256K colors, 240 x 320 pixels, 4:3 ratio Secondary: External OLED display (96 x 32 pixels)
- Media: MP3/MP4 player
- Connectivity: Bluetooth 2.0 (A2DP), USB 2.0

The Samusng SGH-A717 is a flip phone that was designed, branded, and manufactured by Samsung Electronics. It was unveiled in June 2007 at the CES 2007 showcase in Las Vegas.

It was the winner of Editors' Choice Sync for AT&T, but it has minor changes from the original appearance.

== Specifications ==
The A717 houses a 2-megapixel rear camera with six resolutions from 240 ×180 to 1600 × 1200 as the highest and a 2.25-inch TFT display with 262K colors. It supports AT&T Video, which access NBC, Comedy Central, ESPN, the Weather Channel, VH1, and CNN.

Addition features include vibrate mode, text and multimedia messaging, a world clock, an alarm clock, a calculator and a tip calculator as well, a stopwatch, a currency and unit converter, a task list, a notepad, and a calendar.
