= Samsung SGH-X480 =

Mobile phone model

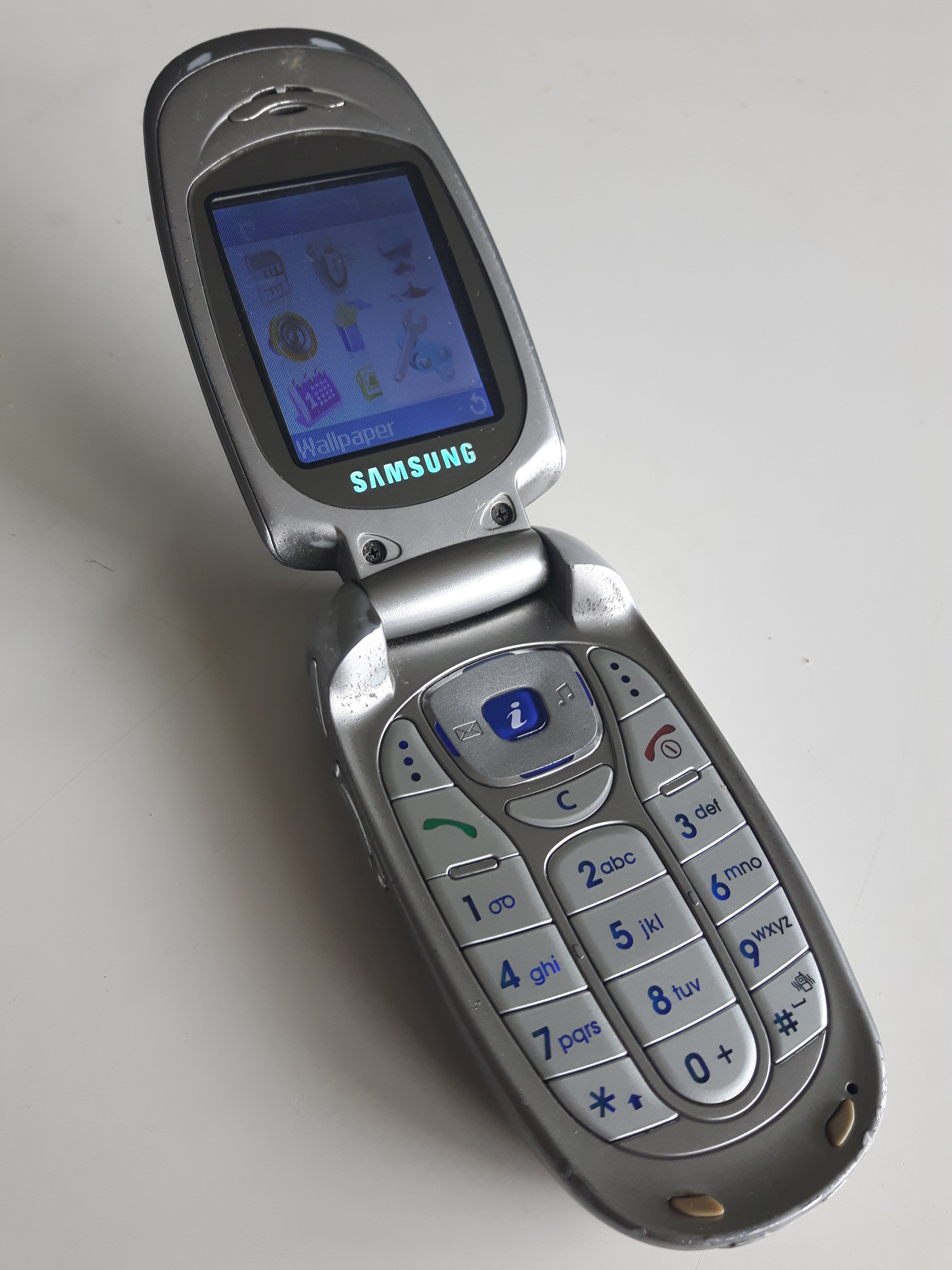
- Manufacturer: Samsung Electronics
- Compatible networks: Tri Band (GSM 900 / 1800 / 1900 MHz)
- Form factor: clamshell
- Dimensions: 85×43.5×22 mm (3.35×1.71×0.87 in)
- Weight: 75 g
- Battery: 800 mAh Li-ion
- External display: 128 × 96 px LCD 65k colors

The SGH-X480 is a mobile phone from Samsung, released in January 2005.

The phone focuses on being small and light rather than on advanced features like camera and music.

Connectivity to PC is made through its serial interface, rather than USB.

The phone uses neither an S20 nor an M20 (both Samsung proprietary) connector for data and charging, but Samsung's older 18-pin connector, without a specific name.

The phone comes with four built-in Java games: BubbleSmile, Fun2Link, Ultimate Golf Challenge, and MobileChess.

Its siblings are Samsung SGH-X481, Samsung SGH-X460
