= Motorola Krave =

Mobile phone

The Krave (model ZN4) is a 3G CDMA mobile phone produced by Motorola, introduced in October 2008 exclusively for Verizon Wireless. It runs the BREW application platform on the Synergy operating system.

== Features ==
The Krave is a revolutionary flip phone in that it is a touch screen phone which can be accessed from the phone's transparent cover, although with less accuracy and sensitivity than with it open. The earpiece speaker and speakerphone microphone is mounted in the middle of the cover, with no apparent connection to the phone. The "wires" are actually a fine mesh which is laminated into the cover. This red-colored mesh can be easily seen only in sunshine or other very bright direct lighting. Because this piece covers part of the 240×400 color LCD screen, some options of the camera and media player are not available with the cover closed, and this portion of the screen is blank black at those times. When closed, it effectively has a qVGA resolution of 240×320.

The phone connects to 1xRTT voice and EV-DO data cellular networks. It also receives V Cast TV, Verizon's brand of mobile TV provided by MediaFLO. This is a pay TV service, and it cannot receive new free-to-air ATSC-M/H signals from local TV stations.

Along with the TV service, a few other functions can be used with the cover closed, including VZ Navigator, the digital music player, and viewing or taking pictures and videos. If the Navigator icon is activated without the additional-cost subscription, it instead plays an audio/video advertisement for the service, and drains the lithium-ion battery by leaving the backlight on at the end until the user discovers it and exits the ad.

The phone has 130MB of available flash memory on board, and takes microSD and microSDHC cards up to 8GB using a slot on the side, mounting it to /mmc1 on the phone's filesystem. Charging and data are via microUSB, while unprotected data (excluding ringtones due to Verizon lockdown) can be exchanged via Bluetooth. Also due to Verizon firmware, it cannot be connected as a standard mass-storage device or media player device.

It has a 3.5mm TRS connector socket for standard headphones, and takes a TRRS connector (like the iPhone) for stereo headsets. The phone can also be operated in this manner, however loose connections can cause it to randomly stop, skip to another song, or even beep very loudly and redial without permission, even with a regular pair of headphones that does not have these features. There is also no setting available to defeat this behavior, which occurs even with the switch in the locked position.

The music player plays MP3, AAC, AAC+, Enhanced AAC+, MIDI, and WMA 9 & 10, and displays album art. When closed, or when open in vertical mode, it has a progress bar that can be dragged through the song. When open in horizontal mode (left side down) it displays only album art, with three others tilted to each side, like the iPhone and iTunes. The song and album name are partly displayed, while the artist name is not displayed at all. Shuffle play is available, but the shuffle order is lost when exiting the player program, either accidentally or to use any other function except to receive an incoming call, or acknowledge a timed reminder.

It also has a voice recorder which saves files in QCP format, which is unreadable by most computer software and must be converted manually to a standard format. Other features include voice command, and the ability to speak the name or phone number of contacts or incoming calls (caller ID).

Bluetooth supports stereo headsets, file and vCard transfer, basic image printing, and other profiles.

== Camera phone ==
The camera phone records pictures in JPEG format, but the Krave can also read GIF, PNG and BMP/DIB files. Thumbnails are stored individually as 9kB device-independent bitmap files (such as filename_jpg.dib, or filename_3g2.dib), occupying up to 10% more flash memory space (with 32kB clusters) than each picture itself (about 320kB at full size). The entire first video frame for each video is also stored this way (ff-filename_3g2.dib) at a resolution higher than the 320×240 of the video itself. Windows cannot read the thumbnails produced by the phone. Automatic creation of thumbnails can significantly slow browsing of photos. There is no way to bookmark, favorite, index, categorize, sort, or tag photos, such that the oldest ones require scrolling through all other photos taken since then. Large numbers of photos in the my_pix folder can cause severe slowness in capturing and browsing photos, and when a card is inserted or the phone reboots or is turned on.

Although Exif data (in UTC rather than the local time zone) is recorded into each picture, the FAT32 filesystem's creation time is displayed as the file info. This information (along with the file-modified time) is destroyed if the file is moved between the phone and the card, causing pictures to appear out of order, as if taken at the time they were moved. Like other Verizon phones, filenames are recorded as MMDDYYhhmmx.jpg or .3g2, where x is the letter a, b, c, etc. Because the year is in the wrong place (the middle instead of the beginning where the most significant digits belong), the sort order appears wrong when viewed on a computer via a card reader, if there are pictures from a previous calendar year.

Videos are recorded with MPEG-4 compression and stored in 3GPP2 (.3g2) format, but it will also play movies in the standard MP4 container format. All videos must not exceed 320×240 in size, and may be up to 30 frames per second. The default time limit is 20 seconds (keeping it under 500kB, small enough to be sent by MMS), but touching the lower-right icon changes this to one hour (free-space permitting). Pictures are up to 1600×1200 or 1200×1600 ("two megapixels", or exactly 1,920,000, also known as UXGA), with the "digital zoom" simply cropping the picture rather than interpolating it, and white balance and brightness still being determined from the entire field of view rather than only what is within the zoomed area. There is no zoom when viewing pictures or videos, and no way to edit them on the phone.

=== Orientation ===
Picture orientation is recorded such that photos (but not videos) are always right-side-up, and are cropped on their ends if being viewed in the opposite orientation from which they were taken. However, the phone only recognizes upright (portrait) and rotated onto its left side (landscape), and does not recognize right-side or upside-down orientation. When put this way or flat on a table, it uses the previously recognized orientation. When entering text messages (or any other text such as address book), the phone uses the standard dialpad and iTap when upright, while it uses a small QWERTY virtual keyboard layout while on its left side. The rotation function is controlled by an accelerometer.

== Reception ==
Product reviews have been generally good for the phone, praising the innovative design, but lacking software features such as shortcuts or customization. One reason is Verizon does require many common user interface features to make phones they sell work in a similar fashion, which usually replaces the OEM's default software. Comments on radio reception have been positive, with many comparing Krave's ability to hold on to weak radio signals similar to the Motorola E815.
