= Samsung SGH-A127 =

2007 mobile flip phone

- Manufacturer: Samsung Electronics
- Series: A
- First released: 2007
- Discontinued: yes
- Predecessor: None
- Successor: SGH-A137
- Form factor: Flip
- Dimensions: 3.39 in (8.6 cm) x 1.67 in (4.2 cm) x .76 in (1.9 cm)
- Weight: 2.86 oz (81 g)
- Battery: • Up to 5 hours talk time • Up to 250 hours standby
- Rear camera: VGA
- Display: 65K CSTN; 128 x 160 pixels
- External display: Black and white; 96 x 96 pixels
- Connectivity: GPRS
- Data inputs: Keypad (alphanumeric, T9)

The Samsung SGH-A127, released in 2007, is a mobile flip phone for AT&T Mobility. It contains a 0.3 MP camera with a dedicated camera key. Samsung discontinued the phone and does not sell it as of 2009.

== Hardware and features ==
The phone uses a proprietary S20-pin plug for headset and charger (with black plastic bezel at the end of the plug's metallic contacts), and supports model AAEP305SBE or compatible headset.

=== External display ===
The flip phone comes with an external display which is used for status and notification purposes. These include network reception, battery capacity, date and time, messages, incoming calls, alerts and alarms.

=== Data ===
The device includes a WAP browser with a dedicated access key. The WAP browser uses GPRS for data. Carrier-specific services include MEdia Net (carrier portal), and Carrier Mall (AT&T, Cingular, or other) for phone-specific customizations, such as ringtones, graphics, applications (games), and multimedia. Note that as of 2014 these services might be discontinued or transformed into a format not supported by the phone's software.

The phone facilitates MMS (multimedia) messaging, which allows sending and receiving text, images, and audio. Functionality is extensive: multimedia messages can be multi-page, they can be given custom or repetitive content from message templates, a specific duration, priority, and expiry date; and messages can be previewed before sending. Incoming multimedia messages can be replied to sender or a group of recipients, and forwarded. Depending on the type of data, information in an MMS message can be used to call the sender, extract addresses to contacts, or save images or audio into a separate folder.

Functionality is included to measure and keep track of the amount of data transferred.

=== Other ===
The phone features T9 text input (optional), with functions allowing the user to expand the default dictionary with their own terms. This only works with languages supported by the phone, wherein the display languages for the North American market are English, French, and Spanish.

More rudimentary features in the phone are alarms (including alarm during power off), calculator, calendar, "To do" list, voice memo, currency converter and world time.

The device contains software or functionality from RSA Security.

== See also ==
- Samsung SGH-E710 — similar phone released a couple years earlier for the EMEA market
