= Samsung SGH-T409 =

Mobile phone model

Samsung SGH-t409
- Manufacturer: Samsung
- Availability by region: June 18, 2007
- Compatible networks: GSM 850/1800/1900 MHz
- Form factor: flip
- Dimensions: 3.50 x 1.85 x 0.77" (89 x 47 x 19.5 mm)
- Weight: 3.10 oz (88 g)
- Memory: 21 MB
- Removable storage: microSD
- Battery: Lithium Ion 880 mAh
- Rear camera: 1.3 megapixel
- Display: 128 x 160 px, 65,536 colors
- External display: Monochrome
- Connectivity: GPRS / EDGE Class 10, Bluetooth 2.0

The Samsung SGH-t409 is a flip phone offered by T-Mobile (United States) in 2007, manufactured by Samsung.
