= Krave =

Krave may refer to:

- Motorola Krave
- Krave Jerky, a producer of flavored jerky
- Krave (cereal), a Kellogg's breakfast cereal with chocolate filling

== See also ==
- Crave (disambiguation)
