= Samsung E1195 =

Mobile phone model

Samsung GT-E1195
- Manufacturer: Samsung Electronics
- Form factor: Clamshell
- Dimensions: (H x W x D): 88 x 44 x 18.9mm
- Operating system: N/A
- Memory: 4MB
- Storage: 8MB
- Rear camera: N/A
- Front camera: N/A
- Display: 1.43" (128 x 128 pixels display resolution)

The Samsung E1195 is an affordable flip phone. It is also known as GT-E1195.

== Standard features ==
The E 1195 model contained a built-in alarm, calendar, FM Radio, game, screen torch light, timer, stopwatch, calculator, and converter.
