= Samsung SGH-T100 =

Mobile phone model

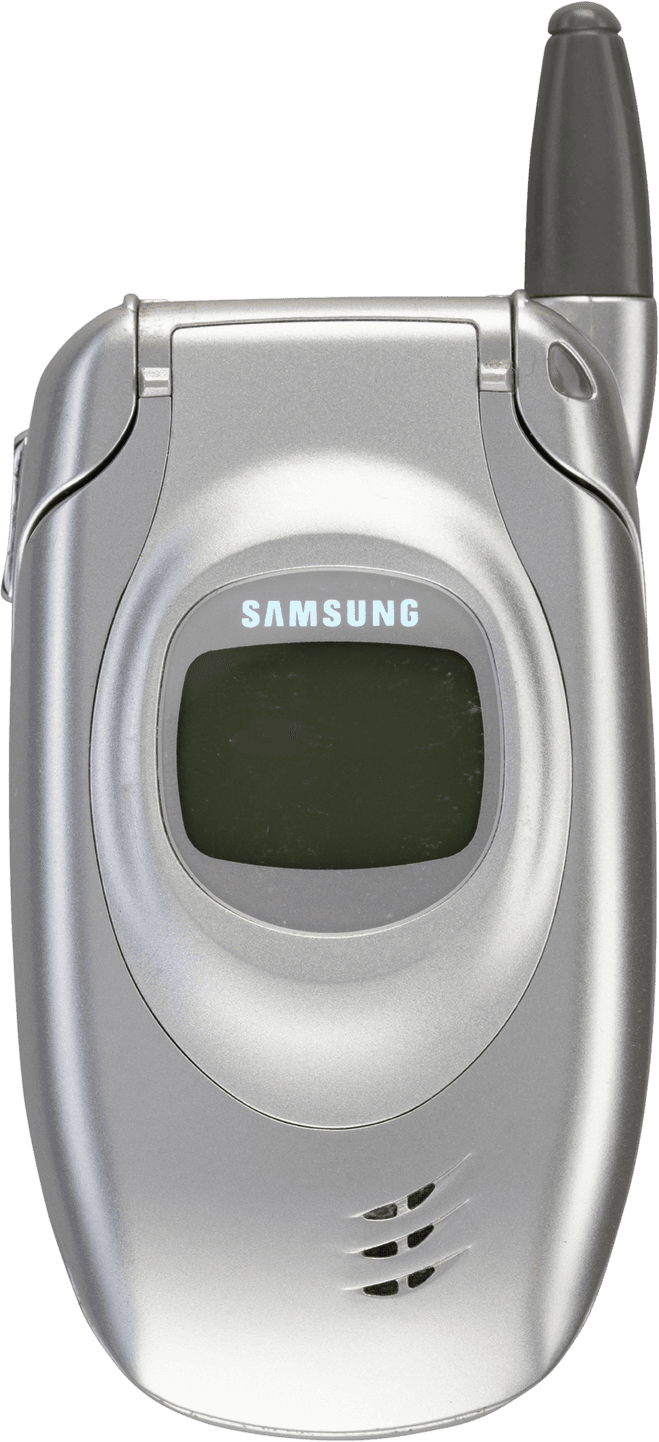
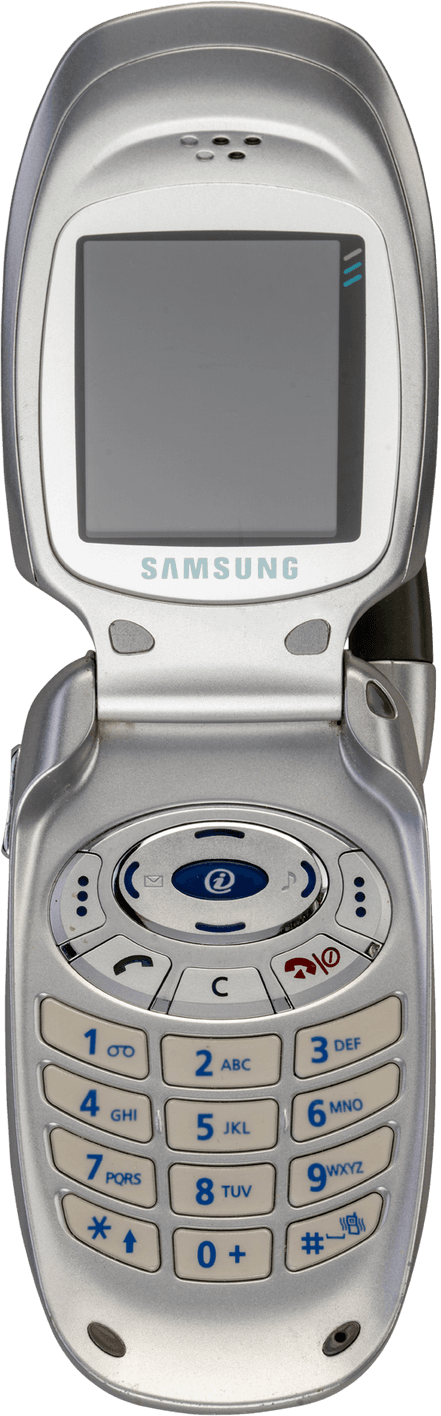
- Manufacturer: Samsung
- Series: Samsung SGH-TXXX series
- Availability by region: April 2002
- Predecessor: Samsung SGH-A800
- Successor: Samsung SGH-T200
- Compatible networks: GSM 900/1800/1900 (tri-band)
- Form factor: clamshell
- Dimensions: 89×46×23 mm (3.50×1.81×0.91 in)
- Weight: 3.24 oz (92 g)
- Operating system: Proprietary
- Memory: 128-256 KB
- Storage: 128-256 KB
- Battery: Lithium Ion 750-900 mAh
- Rear camera: None
- Front camera: None
- Display: 160 x 128 TFT LCD
- External display: 80 × 48, monochrome

The Samsung SGH-T100 is a tri-band GSM feature phone developed and manufactured by South Korean company Samsung Electronics, introduced at the CeBIT fair in 2002. It is a flip phone with a color display, and is an upgraded version of the SGH-A800 which had a monochrome internal LCD screen instead.

The Samsung SGH-T100 was the first mobile phone to use a thin-film transistor active matrix LCD; prior to the release of the SGH-T100 all phones had used passive matrix display technology. It was also the first GSM phone displaying 4096 shades of colours - previous colour phones like Ericsson T68 could only do 256 colours.

The T100 became popular for its stylish looks, display and polyphonic ringtones, and was credited for bringing typically Japanese technologies to GSM markets like Europe. By 2003, the T100 had sold over 10 million units worldwide, becoming Samsung's first to reach this milestone. The T100 was succeeded by Samsung SGH-T200.

Above the T100, Samsung offered in 2002 the SGH-S100, a handset aimed more at professionals that has many extra features like GPRS and support for Java apps. The top model, SGH-V100, had GPRS capability as well as the possibility to view short video clips in MPEG-4 format.

== Variants ==
- SGH-T108/T108+: Chinese Anycall version.

== Related phones ==
- Samsung SCH-X420 - South Korean CDMA monochrome internal display version.
- Samsung SCH-X430 - SK Telecom version. Has a Yamaha MA-3 (40poly vs 16poly).
- Samsung SCH-A562 - Pelephone Israel version. Hardware identical to the SCH-X430.
- Samsung SCH-X199 - CDMA China version
