= Samsung A100 =

Mobile phone model

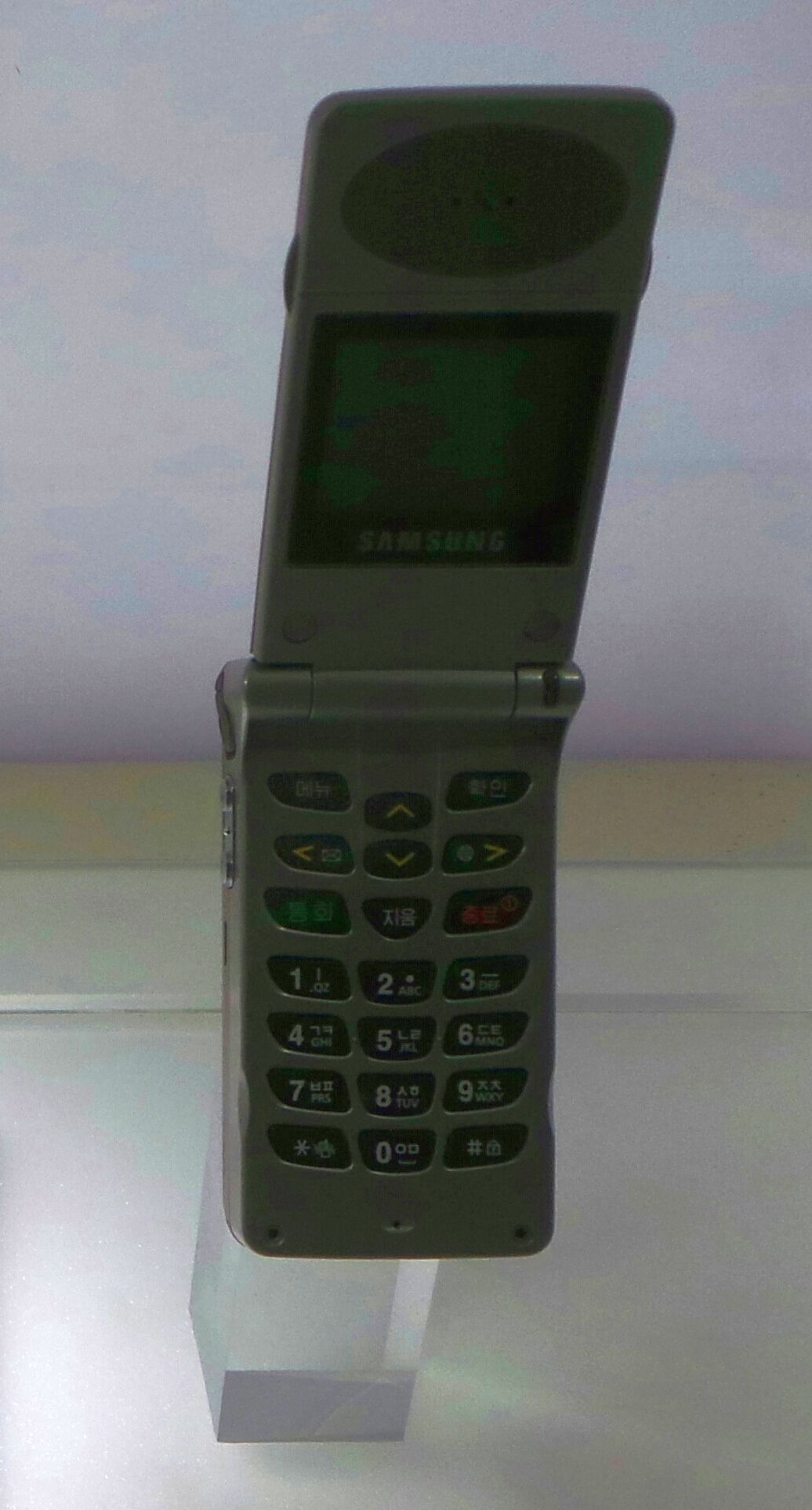
- Manufacturer: Samsung Electronics
- Availability by region: 1999 (SCH-A100); 2000 (SGH-A100); 2000 (SGH-A110)
- Successor: Samsung SGH-A200; Samsung SGH-A300
- Compatible networks: GSM
- Form factor: clamshell
- Dimensions: 80×42×22.5 mm (3.15×1.65×0.89 in)
- Weight: 87 g
- Display: Monochrome graphic screen, 128×64 pixels
- Connectivity: IrDA

Samsung SGH-A100 is a clamshell-style mobile phone designed and developed by Samsung Electronics. It was announced on 9 October 1999 and released in 2000 on the GSM network worldwide. The SGH-A100 is the GSM version of the CDMA SCH-A100 released in South Korea. This handset was introduced there in May 1999 with the name 'Anycall Mini Folder' where it became extremely popular.

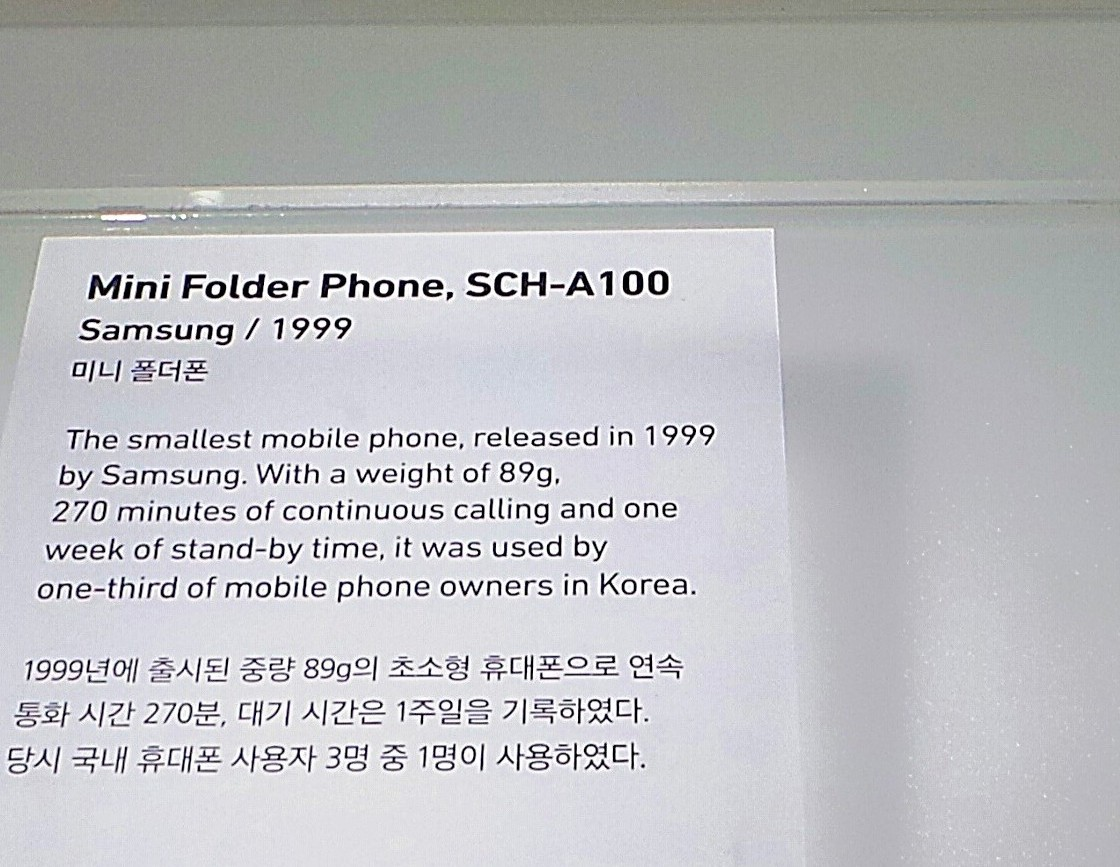
Samsung SCH-A100 information at the Samsung Innovation Museum

In June 2000, Samsung announced a variant, SGH-A110, with an additional WAP browser. It was slated for release by end of Q3 2000 in Singapore.

The A100 was not Samsung's first flip phone: the company released the SCH-800 'Anycall Folder' in October 1998 in South Korea. It became a phenomenon similar to how the Motorola StarTAC had been. This model was later also sold in GSM territories as SGH-800 and a CDMA variant sold in the US as SCH-800. It has a five-line display.

The SGH-A100 (and SGH-A110) were succeeded by SGH-A200 and SGH-A300. The A200 was originally released as 'Anycall Dual Folder' SCH-A2000/SPH-A2000 in South Korea in March 2000, the first flip phone with external display. Its GSM (900/1800 bands) version SGH-A200 was released in Asian territories in the summer of 2001. Other GSM territories such as Europe got the SGH-A300 model around the same time.

== See also ==
- Motorola V3688 - another early flip phone
