= Motorola V710 =

Motorola phone

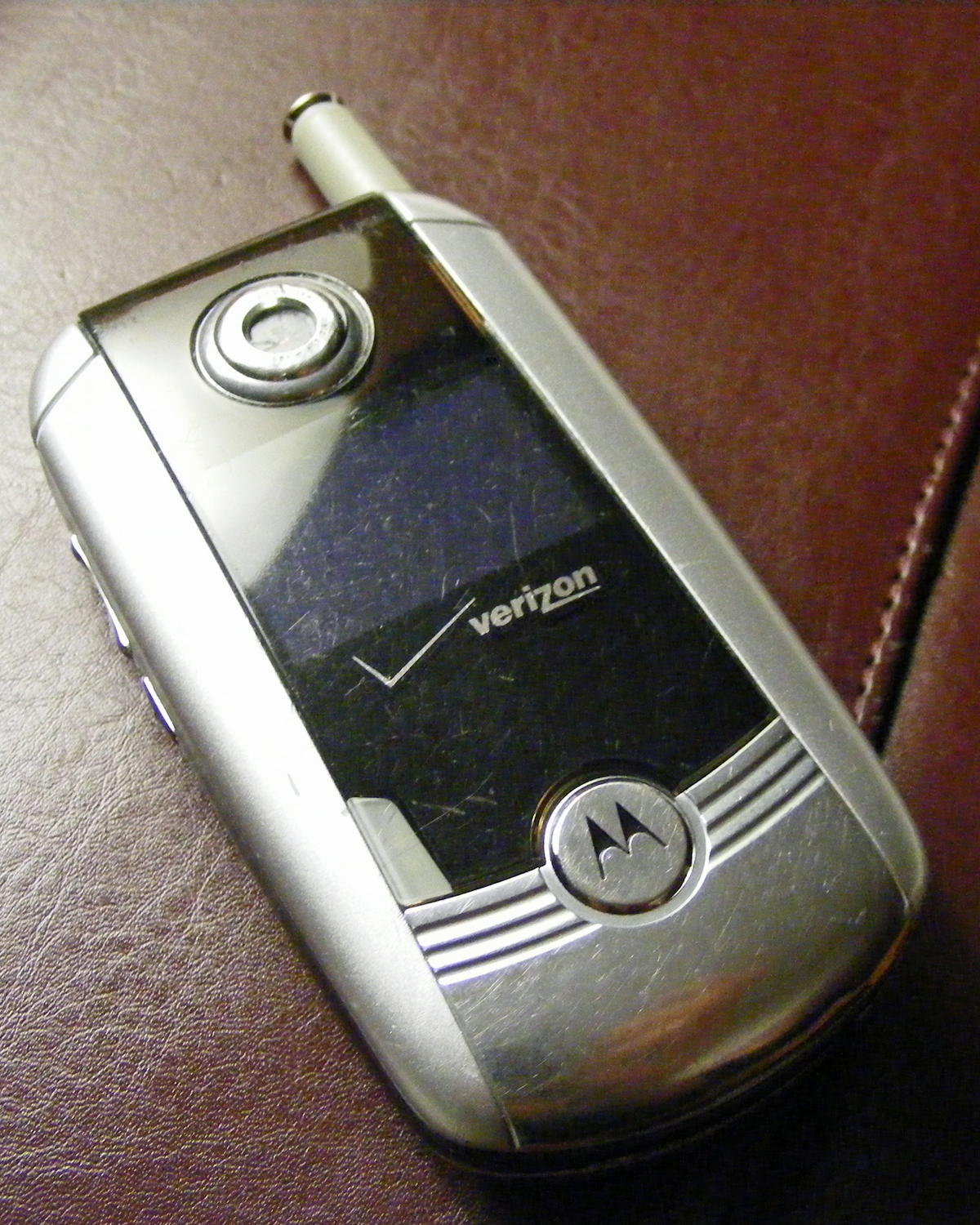
- First released: July 20, 2004
- Predecessor: Motorola T730
- Successor: Motorola E815
- Compatible networks: AMPS 800 (Analog), CDMA 800 and 1900
- Dimensions: 3.70×1.93×0.92 in (94×49×23 mm)
- Weight: 4.06 oz (115 g)
- Memory: 10 MB
- Display: 176×220 pixels, 262,000 colors
- Connectivity: Bluetooth, USB

The Motorola V710 is a CDMA clamshell mobile phone by Motorola, announced in March 2004 and began shipping on July 20, 2004. It was carried in the US by Verizon Wireless and was also the provider's first phone with Bluetooth and a world's first phone with TransFlash memory cards support.

The Motorola V710 has a 2.2 inch color display, a one megapixel camera, and a TransFlash memory card slot. It also had an email client, instant messaging, and support for BREW apps. The specs were considered impressive for its time and the phone therefore became highly anticipated.

Despite its long list of features, the V710 has received mixed reviews, particularly due to poor camera quality and low battery life which were considered below expectations for a premium phone. On October 25, 2004, Verizon Wireless temporarily pulled the Motorola V710 from shelves after the discovery of poorly installed cameras on some handsets. Verizon was also sued for false advertizing for crippling its Bluetooth features. The follow-up Motorola E815 improved significantly on the V710's shortcomings.

== Carriers ==
The phone has been distributed in North and South America by the following carriers:

- Verizon (United States)
- U.S. Cellular (United States)
- Alltel (United States)
- SureWest Wireless (United States)
- TELUS (Canada)
- Vivo (Brazil)
- movistar (Colombia)
- movistar (Panama)
- Qwest (United States)
- Golden State Cellular (United States)
- Alaska Communications Systems (Alaska)
- Unefon (Mexico)

== Criticism and Verizon lawsuit ==
Verizon advertised this phone as having full Bluetooth capability, when in reality it had no OBEX function built in. After many complaints, in January 2005 a class action suit was filed for false advertising, not only for the advertising of a phone to do things it was incapable of, but also for customers complaining to Verizon and being told an update was coming out "in November." Verizon also disables (or severely limits, depending on the firmware version) the ability to use MIDI and MP3 files, stored on the MicroSD card, as ringtones, in an effort to direct users to its own paid service, "Get It Now!."

The basic factory model of this phone with basic Motorola firmware shipped to smaller regional carriers does not employ these lockouts.

Verizon argued the limitation was due to "contractual agreements" with the providers, whereas the CTIA went further to say it protected customers from potential viruses. In September 2005, an agreement in the litigation was reached whereby continuing subscribers get a $25 service credit or can opt out of the contract without any cancellation fees.

There have been similar complaints over the V710's successor, the E815, over Verizon's crippling of the phone's features in order to charge the customer more.

== In popular culture ==
The V710 (and the Motorola V600) appear in The Departed.

== Related phones ==
The cheaper, entry level CDMA clamshell offered by Verizon at the time was the Motorola V265. The V265's successor, Motorola V325, was released by Verizon in December 2005-January 2006. It was the first cell phone compatible with Verizon Wireless' VZ Navigator application, which provides customers with turn-by-turn, written, and spoken directions to more than 14 million points of interest in the U.S. US Cellular also carried this phone as the Motorola V323.
