= Sharp IS01 =

Smartbook

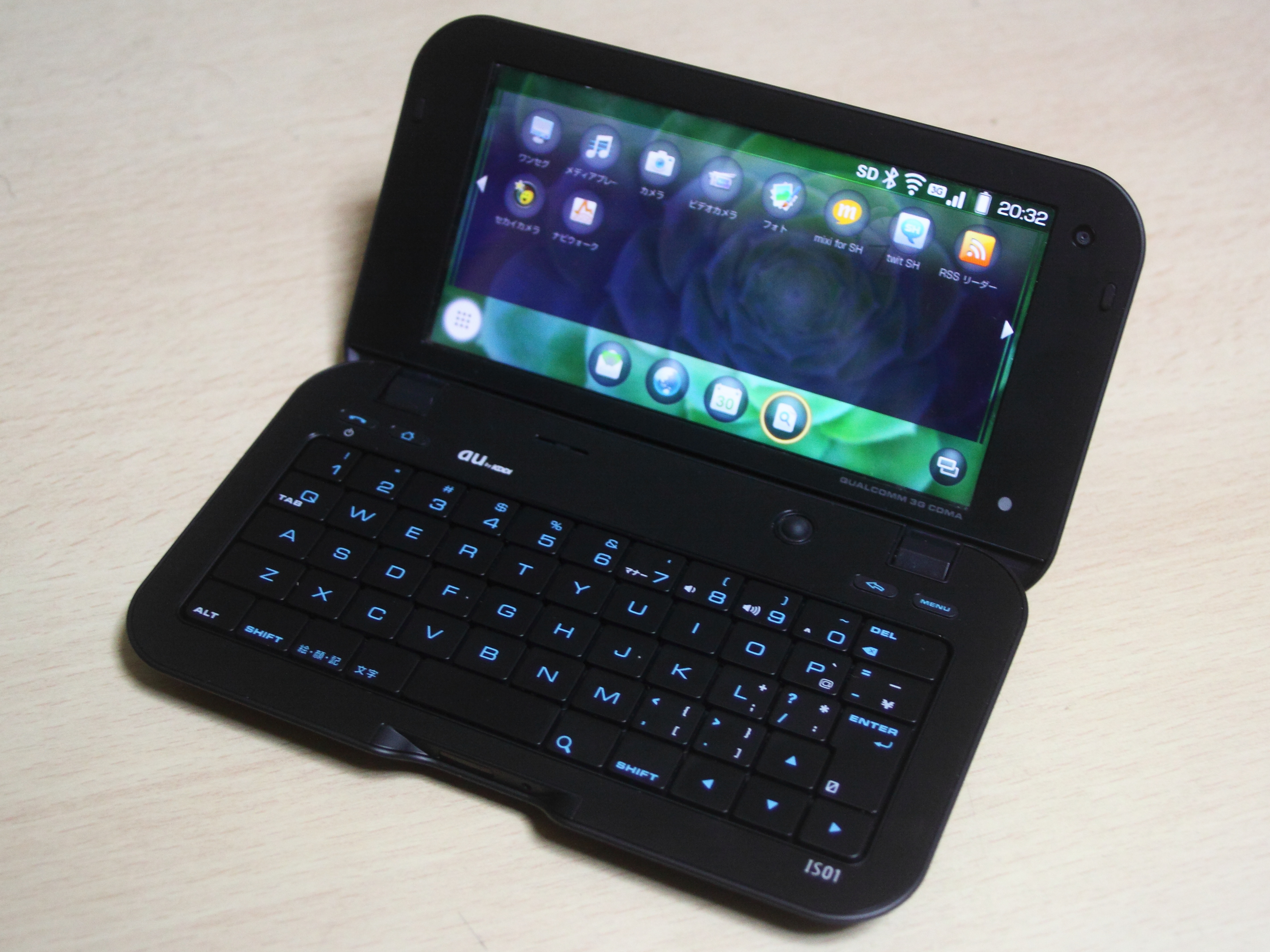
Sharp IS01

The Sharp IS01 is a smartbook device from Sharp released in 2010.

== History ==
It started shipping in June 2010.

It was never released in the United States.

== Specifications ==
- 1GHZ Qualcomm SoC
- Android 1.6
- 5" touchscreen

== Reception ==
The Sharp IS01 was not well received in a review by Engadget.
