= Dialling (telephony) =

Initiating a telephone call by turning the rotary dial or pressing the keypad buttons

Dialling (dialing in American English) is the procedure of initiating a telephone call by operating the rotary dial or the telephone keypad of a telephone.

== Rotary dial ==
=== In Britain ===
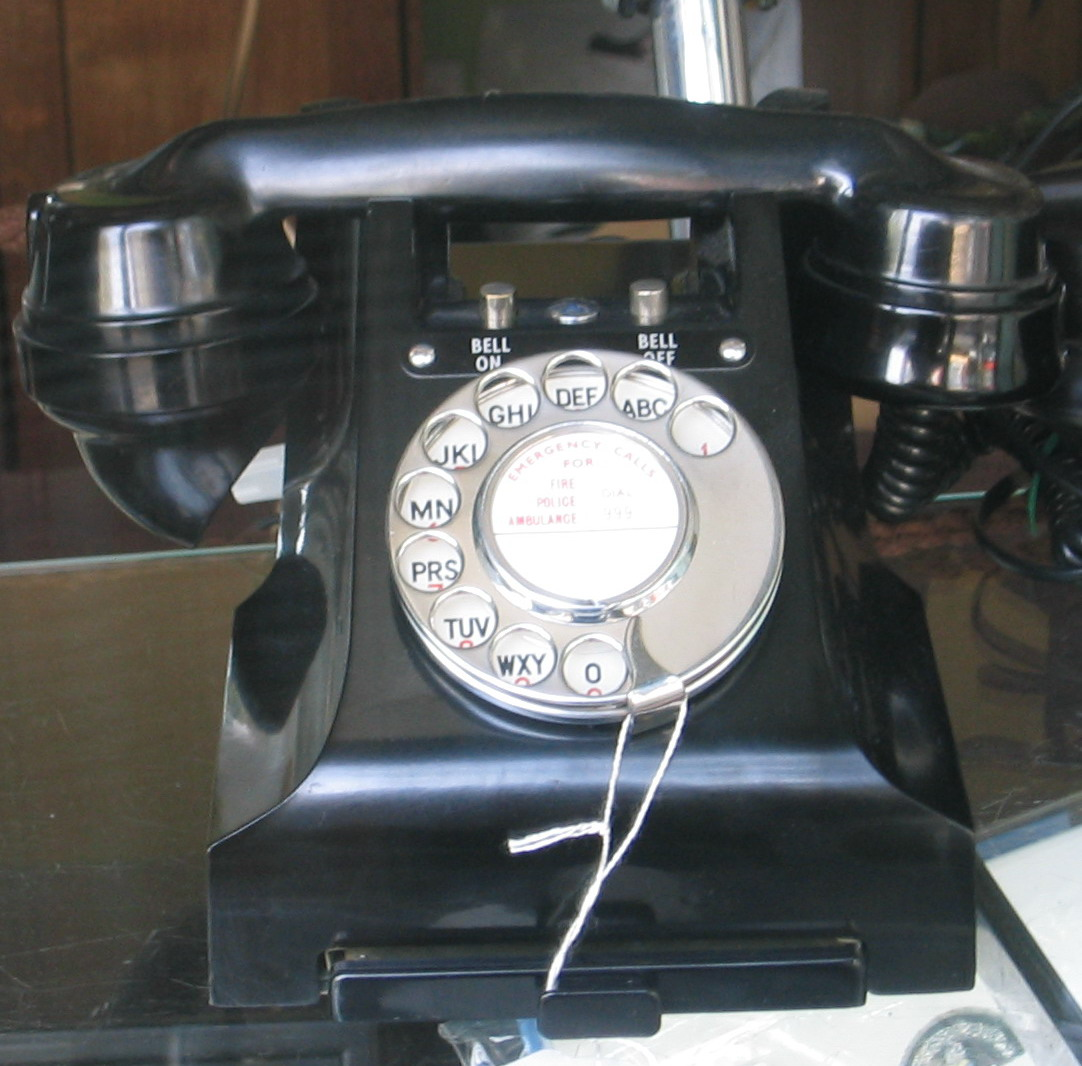
GPO 332 Telephone with letter codes

From 1912, the British General Post Office, which also operated the British telephone system, installed several automatic telephone exchanges from several vendors in trials at Darlington on 10 October 1914 (rotary system), Fleetwood (relay exchange from Sweden), Grimsby (Siemens), Hereford (Lorimer) and Leeds (Strowger). The BPO selected the Strowger switches for small and medium cities and towns. However, the selection of switching systems for London and other large cities was not decided until the 1920s, when the Director telephone system was adopted. The Director systems used SXS switches for destination routing and number translation facilities similar to the register used in common-control exchanges. Using similar equipment as in the rest of the network was deemed beneficial and the equipment could be manufactured in Britain.

== Touch tone dial ==
DTMF keypad layout

Introduced to the public in 1963 by AT&T, Touch-Tone dialling greatly shortened the time of initiating a telephone call. It also enabled direct signaling from a telephone across the long-distance network using audio-frequency tones, which was impossible with the rotary dials that generated digital direct current pulses that had to be decoded by the local central office.

The touch tone key pad has sixteen keys laid out in a four-by-four matrix. Each key produces a combination of two audible tone frequencies, determined by their position on the pad. Each column and row has a distinct frequency assigned, thus generating a total of sixteen dual-tone multi-frequency (DTMF) signals. Early keypads only used the keys with the digits 1 through 9 and 0. The extra keys were intended for computer data entry, business functions, and military applications. By 1967, the keys with the asterisk (*) and hash (#) were added on all subscriber telephone sets. The keys A, B, C, D were used as priority signals (FO, F, I, and P) in the Automatic Voice Network (AUTOVON) of the US military.

Initial push button designs employed mechanical switches, so that each button activated certain combinations of capacitors and inductors of an oscillator, while later versions used semiconductor logic chips to synthesize the frequencies. The tones are decoded by the receiver to determine the keys pressed by the user.

DTMF keypad frequencies (with sound clips)
	1209 Hz	1336 Hz	1477 Hz	1633 Hz
697 Hz	1	2	3	A
770 Hz	4	5	6	B
852 Hz	7	8	9	C
941 Hz	*	0	#	D

For example, the key 1 produces a superimposition of tones of 697 and 1209 hertz (Hz).
