= Motorola E815 =

Motorola cell phone released in 2005

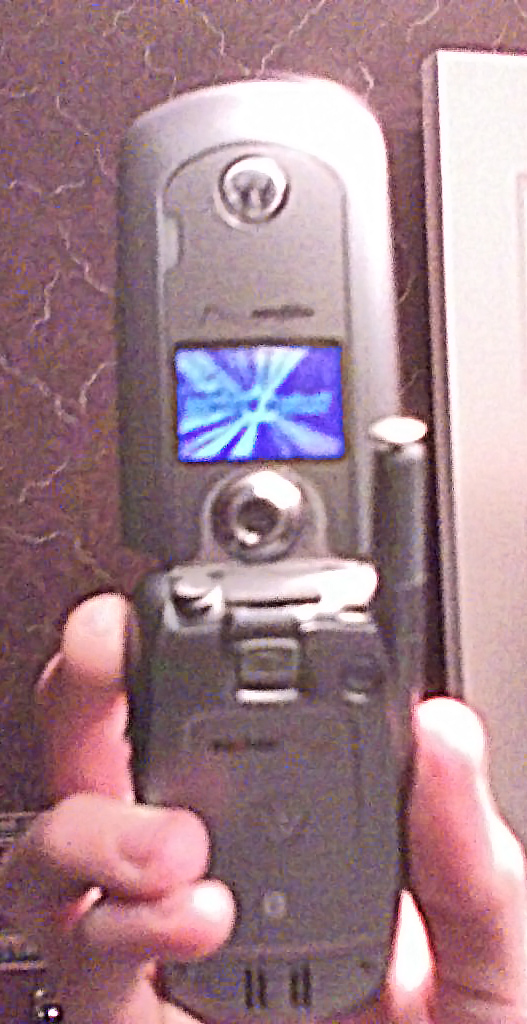
- Compatible networks: CDMA 850 and 1900
- Dimensions: 3.70 in × 1.93 in × 0.92 in (94 mm × 49 mm × 23 mm)
- Weight: 4.60 oz (130 g)
- Memory: 43.2 MB
- Display: 176x220 pixels, 262,000 colors
- Connectivity: Bluetooth 1.1, USB

The Motorola E815 is a CDMA clamshell mobile phone made by Motorola that is the successor to the V710. It was Motorola's first EV-DO phone and was released in July 2005. The Motorola E815 was a good seller in the US (carried by Verizon Wireless) and it was as of 2006 one of the most popular 3G cell phones in use in the US along with Motorola Razr V3c. The phone was also carried by Alltel. A variant named Motorola E816 was also made.

== Features ==
It includes the following features:

- 1.3-megapixel camera with LED flash, 4x digital zoom, and self-portrait capability, video clips up to 3 minutes
- Video capture and playback (3GP)
- TFT LCD with 176x220 pixels supporting 262,000 colors.
- Integrated stereo MP3 player
- 40 MB of internal flash memory
- Expandability via TransFlash/microSD memory cards (up to 1 GB in capacity)
- Full-duplex speakerphone
- Speaker independent speech recognition with voice digit dialing
- High-Speed Data Technology: cdma2000 1xRTT, EVDO
- GPS Localization
- Bluetooth 1.1: HSP, HFP, DUN, OPP, OBEX (Alltel) and FTP profiles
- USB to PC Sync

The E815 also supports picture and ringer ID's, up to 6 numbers per contact, using MP3's and MIDI files as ringtones, Openwave WAP 2.0, EMS/MMS/SMS picture messaging, voice memos, alarms, calculator and calendars.

== Criticism ==
Unlike the V710, which inherently had no Bluetooth OBEX profile, the E815 includes OBEX compatibility. However, this feature was disabled by Verizon, as were (like the V710) the options to copy and move files between the TransFlash memory card and the phone's internal memory. However, several enthusiast groups dedicated to hacking Motorola phones exist, and despite Verizon's attempts to limit the phone's native features, several tutorials have surfaced providing detailed instructions on how to re-enable crippled features.

One of the most criticised restrictions imposed on the Verizon version of the E815 is the obscurity and deliberate lack of any documented explanation of how to upload one's own custom ringtones to the handset. Verizon Wireless has stated the reason for the restriction on uploads is a precaution against a subscriber uploading malware to their phone. A more cynical view might be that Verizon wishes subscribers to purchase ringtones from their "Get It Now" service. Owners of the E815 have found that it is possible to upload ringtones using Verizon's VZWPIX website. For those who do not have an unlimited picture messaging plan, there is a small fee for the upload, but it's considerably less than purchasing a ringtone. Phone owners have also found a way to put ringtones on the phone using a transflash card.

Another restriction applied to this phone (by all carriers) is the inability to use QNC data, which was still (and may still be) the only data service available in some areas of the country and this is usually not brought up when people purchase this handset. Bell Mobility (Canada) has also been known to disable EV-DO functionality of the phone on their network, and there is currently no way to circumvent this block. EV-DO data does work if the phone is activated on another carrier such as Verizon or Alltel.

The E815 as well as the E816 variant used on the ill-fated Amp'd Mobile network both suffered from flawed internal battery charger software causing difficulties in charging the phone's battery. As a result, users had to resort to external battery chargers in order to continue to use the phone due to the internal charger's growing inability to function over time.
