= Flip phone =

Hinged mobile phone

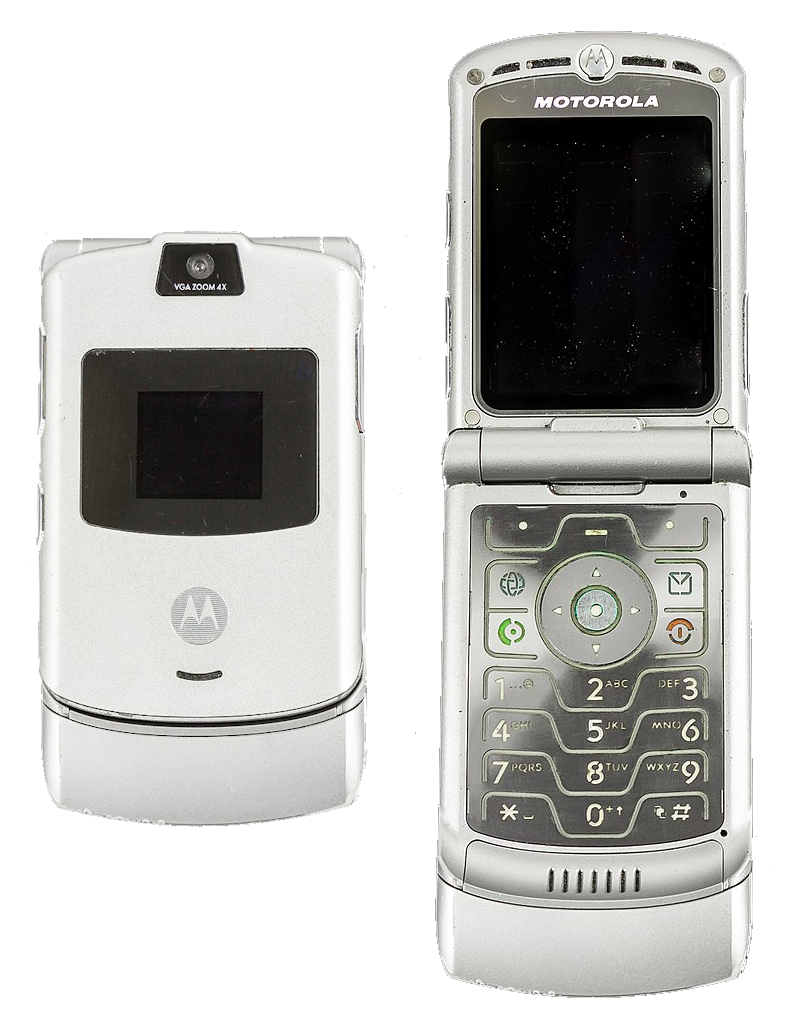
The Motorola Razr

A flip phone is a mobile phone comprising two sections connected by a hinge allowing the phone to be flipped open.

== Fictional Inspirations ==
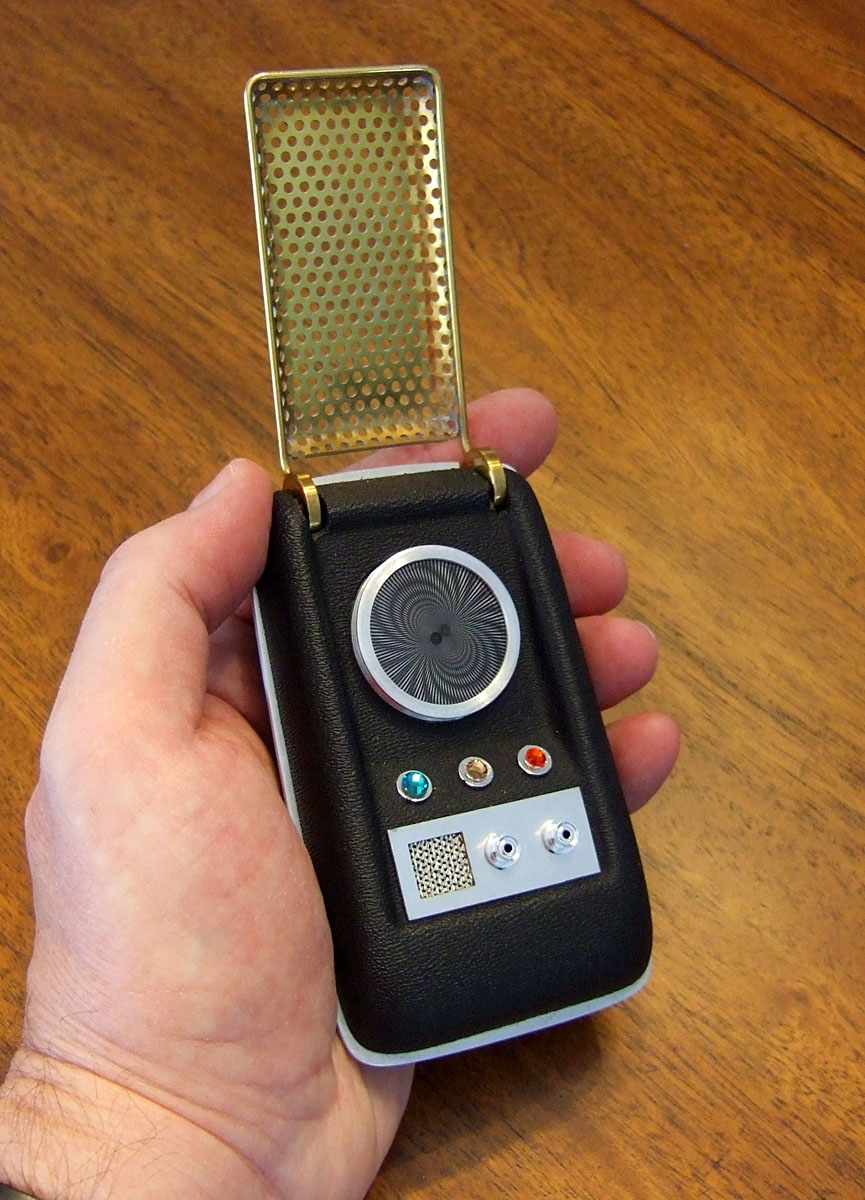
StarTrek Communicator

A "flip phone" like communication device appears in chapter 3 of Armageddon 2419 A.D., a science fiction novella by Philip Francis Nowlan, which was first published in the August 1928 issue of the pulp magazine Amazing Stories: "Alan took a compact packet about six inches square from a holster attached to her belt and handed it to Wilma. So far as I could see, it had no special receiver for the ear. Wilma merely threw back a lid, as though she was opening a book, and began to talk. The voice that came back from the machine was as audible as her own." Also from science fiction, Star Trek featured a regular plot device called the "Communicator" which influenced the development of early flip phones such as the Motorola MicroTAC and StarTAC. The acronym "TAC" is an abbreviation of "Total Area Coverage" and was first used for the Motorola DynaTAC.

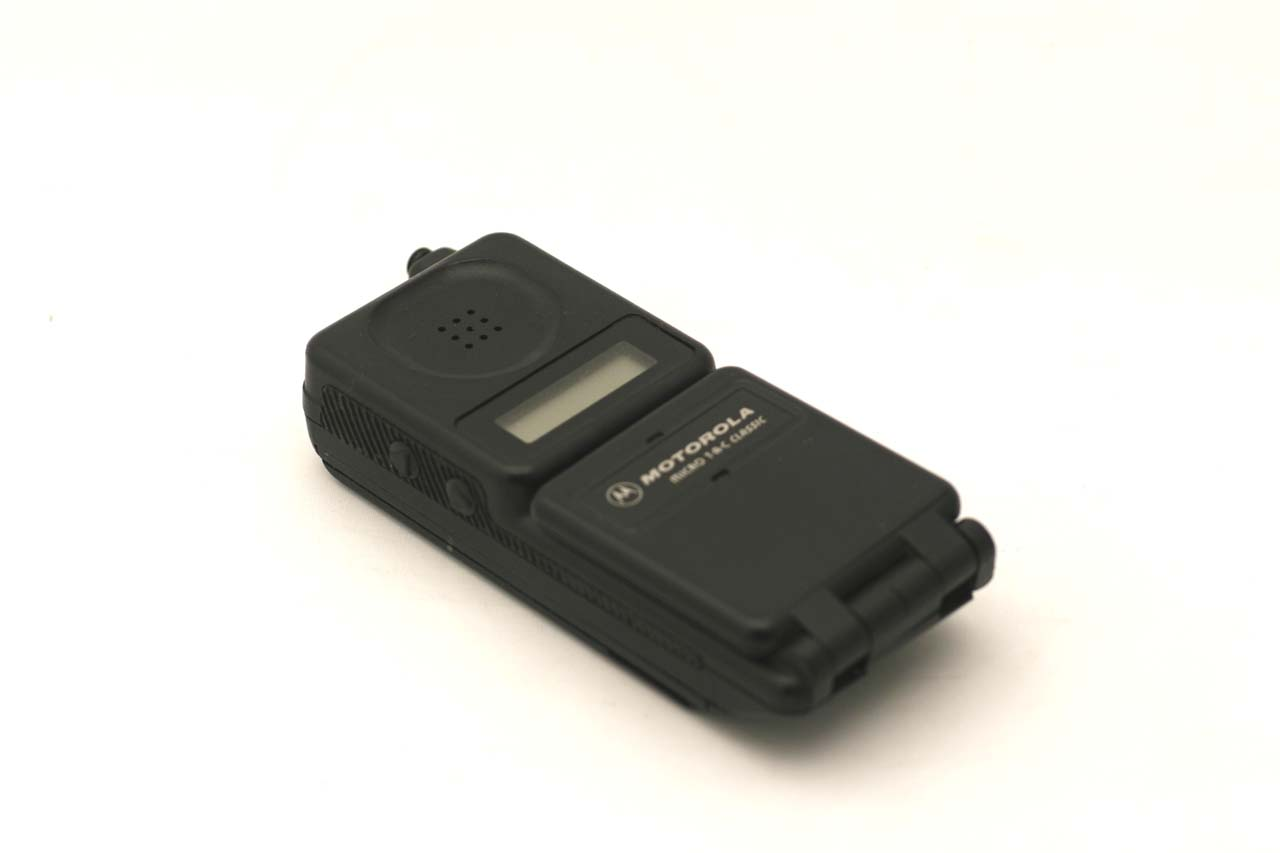
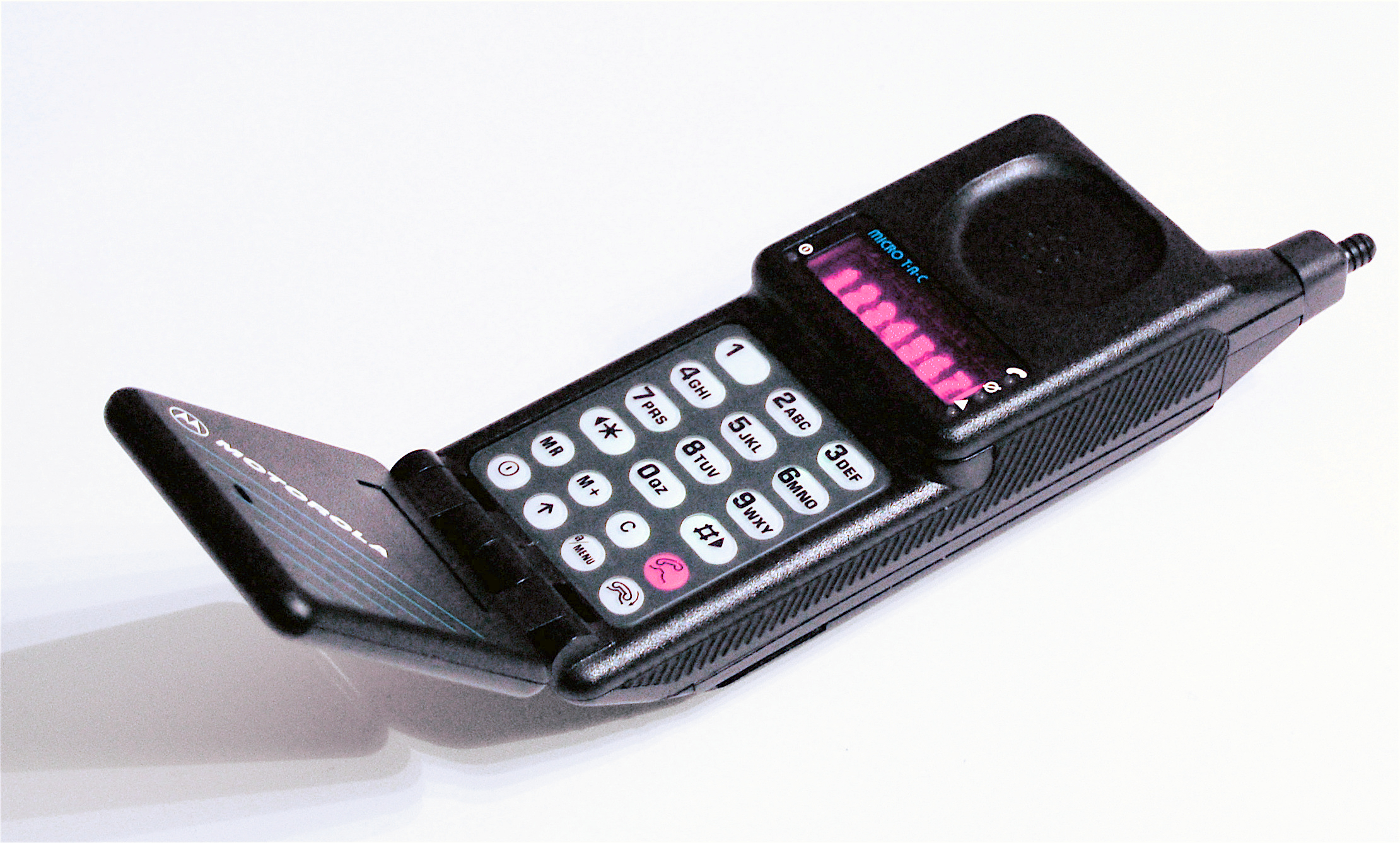
The Motorola MicroTAC was one of the first flip phones (1989).

== Etymology ==
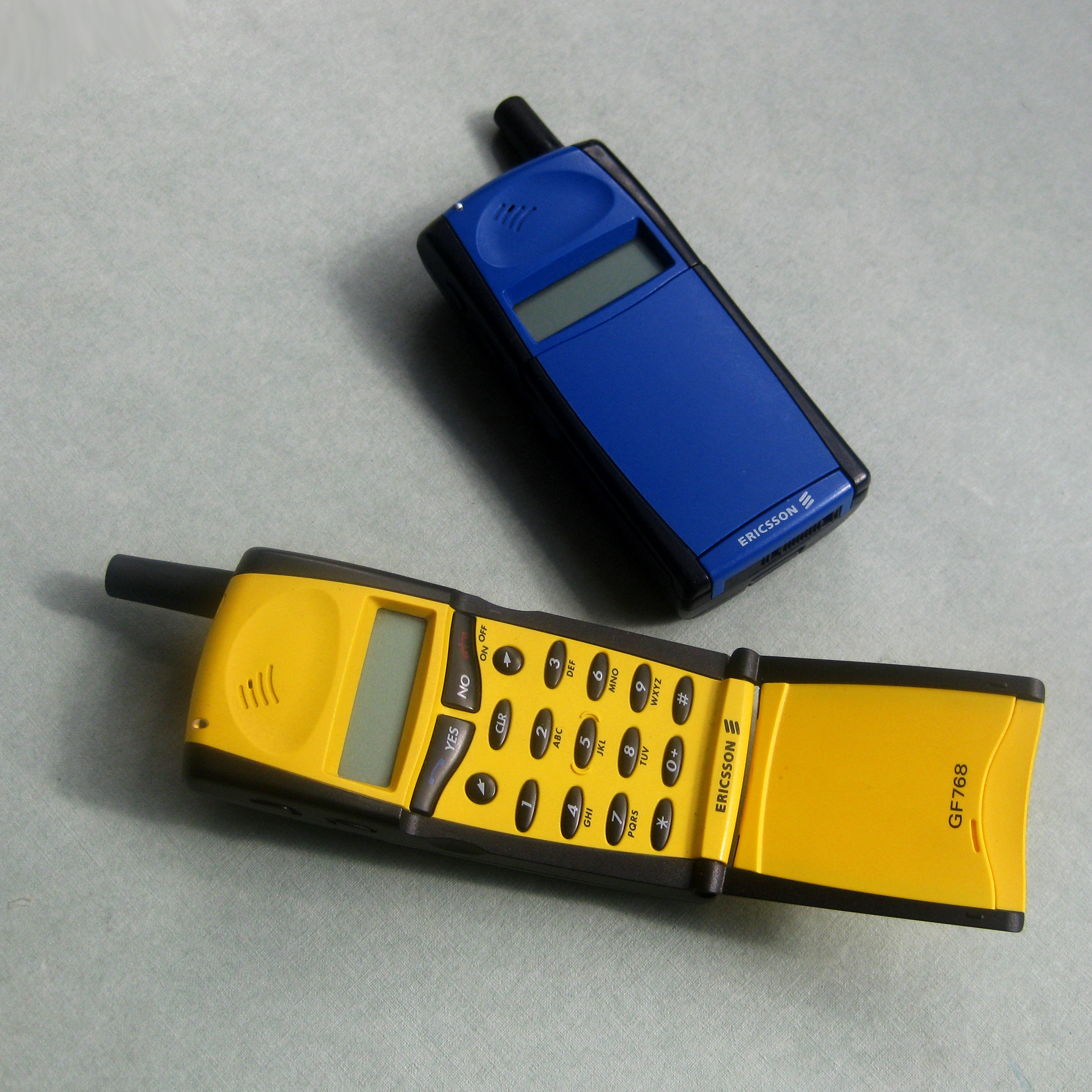
Candybar form factor Ericsson model GF-768 with flip down keypad cover (1997)

The term "flip phone" typically refers to a phone where the upper part of the device folds out to reveal a display and keypad. Historically "flip phone" referred to a type of candybar phone with a folding cover, folding downwards to reveal a keypad – now these are usually called 'flip down'. Such a design originated on GTE landline phones, who held the trademark 'Flip Phone' until Motorola acquired it, a few years after releasing the MicroTAC, the first cell phone in this form factor. Phones in this style were relatively common in the mid and late 1990s, other known examples being the Ericsson T28. On the other hand, symmetrical clamshell designs that unfold upwards such as the Motorola StarTAC were in earlier years variously referred to as "folder" type or style, or "folding" phones, before the term "flip phone" entered common usage during the 2000s to refer to these.

The Palm Treo 180, Motorola A760, and Motorola MING are examples of flip phones where the exterior is a display cover, and the display is on the lower part – this was common on some PDAs and PDA-style smartphones in the 2000s. Motorola also developed such a phone with a touchscreen in 2008, the Krave ZN4, but touch displays in this style were uncommon. The Nokia Communicator series is an example of flip phones that look like a miniature notebook computer. Also, some flip phones were made in an unconventional wider style, such as the fashion-oriented Siemens Xelibri 6 and the Alcatel OT-808 with a full QWERTY keyboard. In addition, some experimental flip phones look normal but have additional mechanisms and forms (like rotating displays), for example Nokia N90, Samsung P400 and LG G7070.

== Early History ==
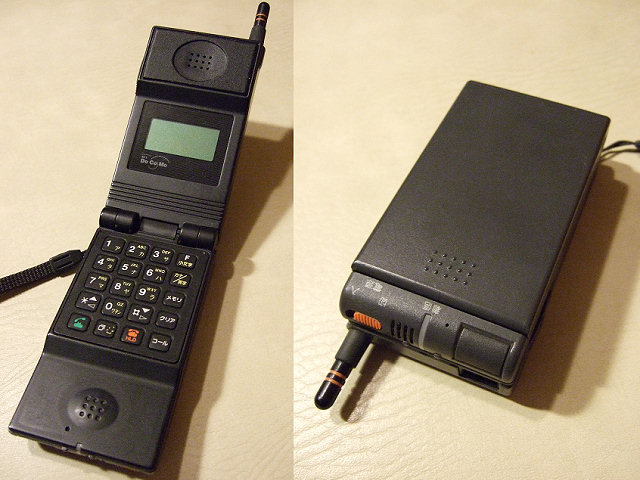
NEC TZ-804 Mova N (1991)

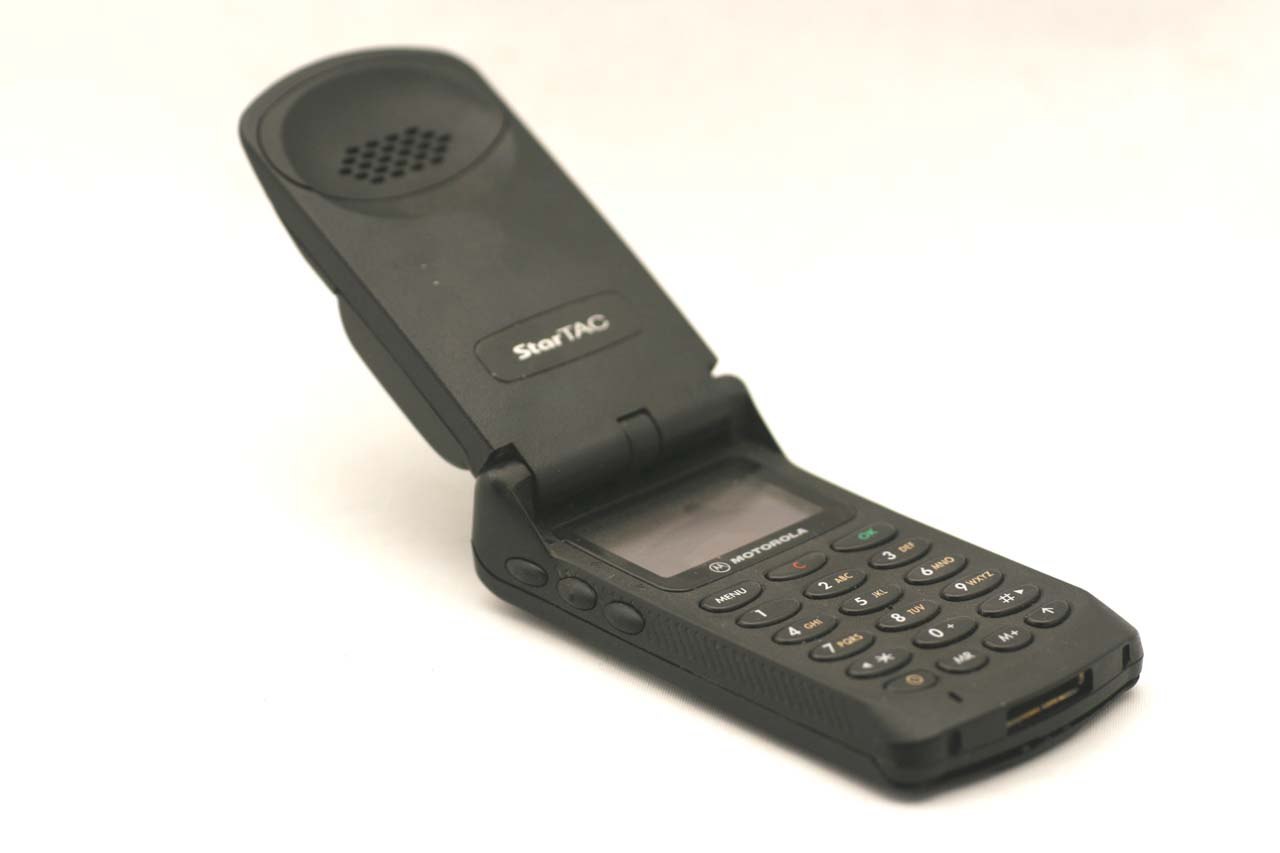
The Motorola StarTAC (1996)

The NEC TZ-804 (Mova N), launched in 1991, was the earliest mobile phone with a flip phone design. Another early notable flip phone was Motorola's StarTAC introduced in 1996. An iconic product, it was extremely compact and light for its time, and it flipped upwards to reveal a standard display and keypad on the lower part and a speakerphone on the upper. The StarTAC series was the first example of a fashionable mobile phone against the usual products of its time. For the rest of the decade, this 'flip up' clamshell style in mobile phones was mainly a product of Motorola only, and in 1999 the company released its next generation 'Vader' flip phone, Motorola V series, which again achieved popularity and was even smaller than the StarTAC. It was the first flip phone (in the West) with the now-conventional design of a display in the upper part of the device and a keypad on the lower.

At the same time as Motorola's V series, the form factor took off in Asia: the StarTAC was extremely popular in South Korea, which led to Samsung Electronics developing its first flip phone, the SCH-800, released domestically in October 1998 to tremendous success. In 1999, Samsung released the silver-colored A100 'Mini Folder' phone in South Korea to even greater success. Meanwhile in Japan, NEC released the silver N501i flip phone in March 1999 for use with the new i-mode mobile Internet service. Both Samsung and NEC popularised the flip phone in their respective countries. Cited benefits of the form factor compared to regular candybar phones were the ability to have a larger display in a smaller device, as well as not having the risk of buttons being accidentally pressed, and the subjective view that they were fashionable.

== Popularity ==
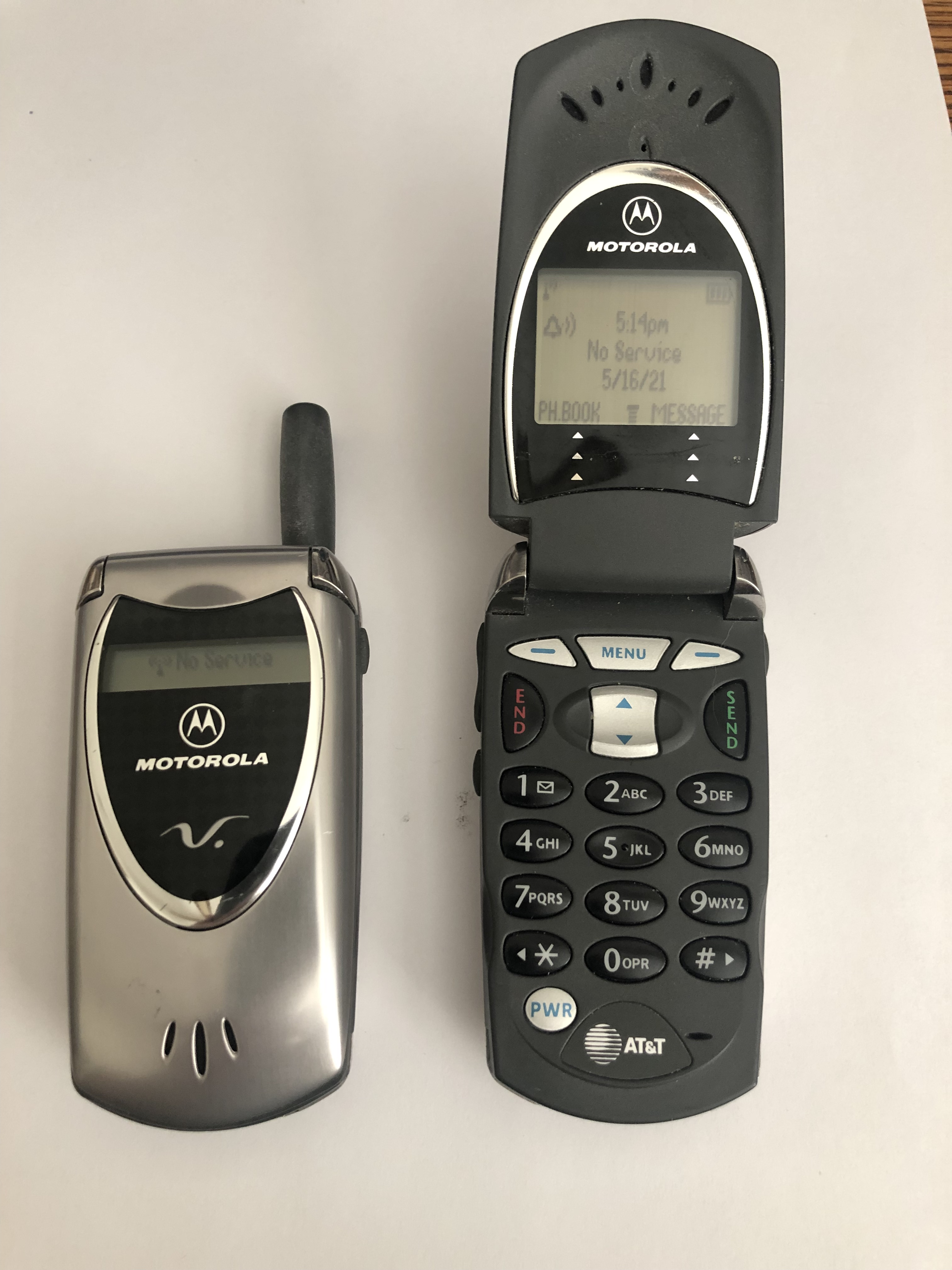
Motorola V60 (2001)

After the millennium, flip phones experienced a boom globally, with Samsung especially being influential in this development whose line of silver flip phones were positively received as being stylish. The Samsung SGH-A100 made its debut in Europe in 2000 and in the same year the company released locally the A200 'Dual Folder', which was the first flip phone with an external display – allowing users to see who is calling without opening the phone – a feature that would become industry standard. Marketed as "Blue-i" (referring to the blue backlit circular external display), the model was released in Asian markets in 2001 while other regions got the A300 model. Motorola released the Motorola V60 in 2001 with a metallic body and an external display, a handset that became very popular in the US and was noted for looking luxurious.

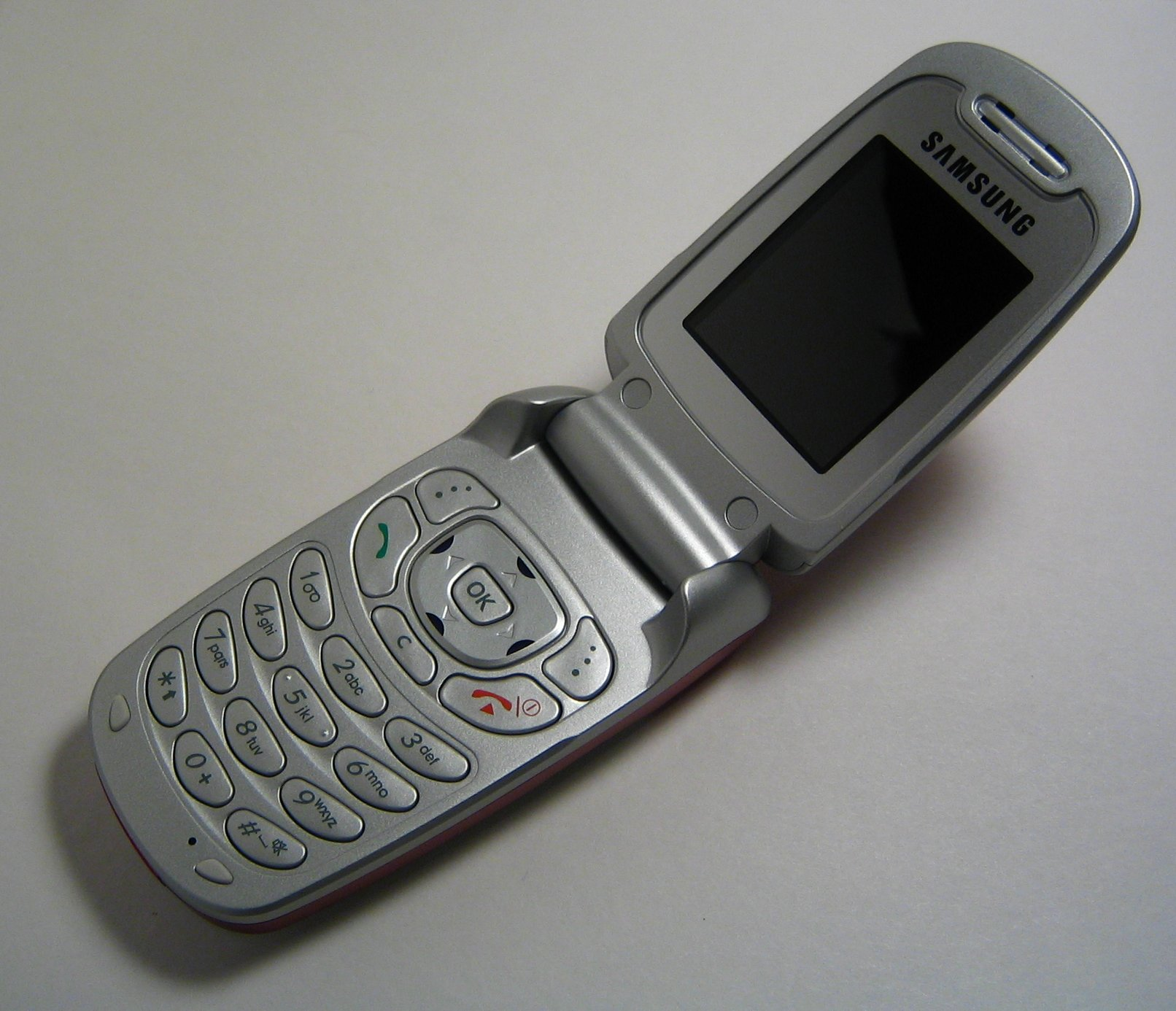
Samsung SGH-T209

The new style of flip phones were initially seen as solely fashion products, but by 2002 and 2003 they were dominating sales in Asia while being trendy elsewhere. The Samsung SGH-T100 released in 2002 was the first flip phone with a color screen and it enjoyed global popularity. Motorola presented its first with a color display in the T720. Samsung also released the first 3G (UMTS) flip phone in Europe, the SGH-Z100. Eventually many other manufacturers, mainly Asian (such as LG, Sharp and Sanyo) as well as the likes of Siemens were offering flip phones globally. Nokia, the largest mobile phone manufacturer, had initially been reluctant to develop flip phones; it shipped its first such product in early 2004, the Nokia 7200, with unusual textile covers. Nokia's products were more distinct with its rectangular corners and experimented with different styles as seen on the 7200, 2650 and 6170, although in 2005 the company released its first "Asian" influenced flip phone with rounded corners and a silver color, the Nokia 6101. Sony Ericsson also shipped its first flip phone, the Z600, in 2004, with the company mainly targeting women in its future flip phones ('Z' series).

The Motorola V3 (RAZR) is the most iconic product during the peak of the flip phone era, combining the clamshell form factor with a sleek and thin, silver-colored body (although it was also released in pink and other colors), and a flat etched keypad. The lack of a protruding external antenna also helped its style (although it was not the first product with this distinction). The RAZR series was the best-selling phone in the United States for three years in a row (2005, 2006 and 2007). It was highly influential during the mid-2000s and a large number of rival manufacturers imitated its physical characteristics in their own new products. In Japan, domestic flip phones during this time were uniquely advanced and has been associated with the Galápagos syndrome. Flip phones were still ubiquitous here as of 2009, after it had already dropped in popularity in the West.

== Flip smartphones ==
The Samsung SCH-i600 introduced in 2002 was one of the first smartphones in a flip phone form factor; it ran on Microsoft's Windows Smartphone 2002 software. Another early smartphone in this form factor was the Kyocera 7135 from 2003 which ran Palm OS and the Motorola MPx200. Panasonic introduced the first flip phone running Symbian, the X700, in 2004.

== Decline ==
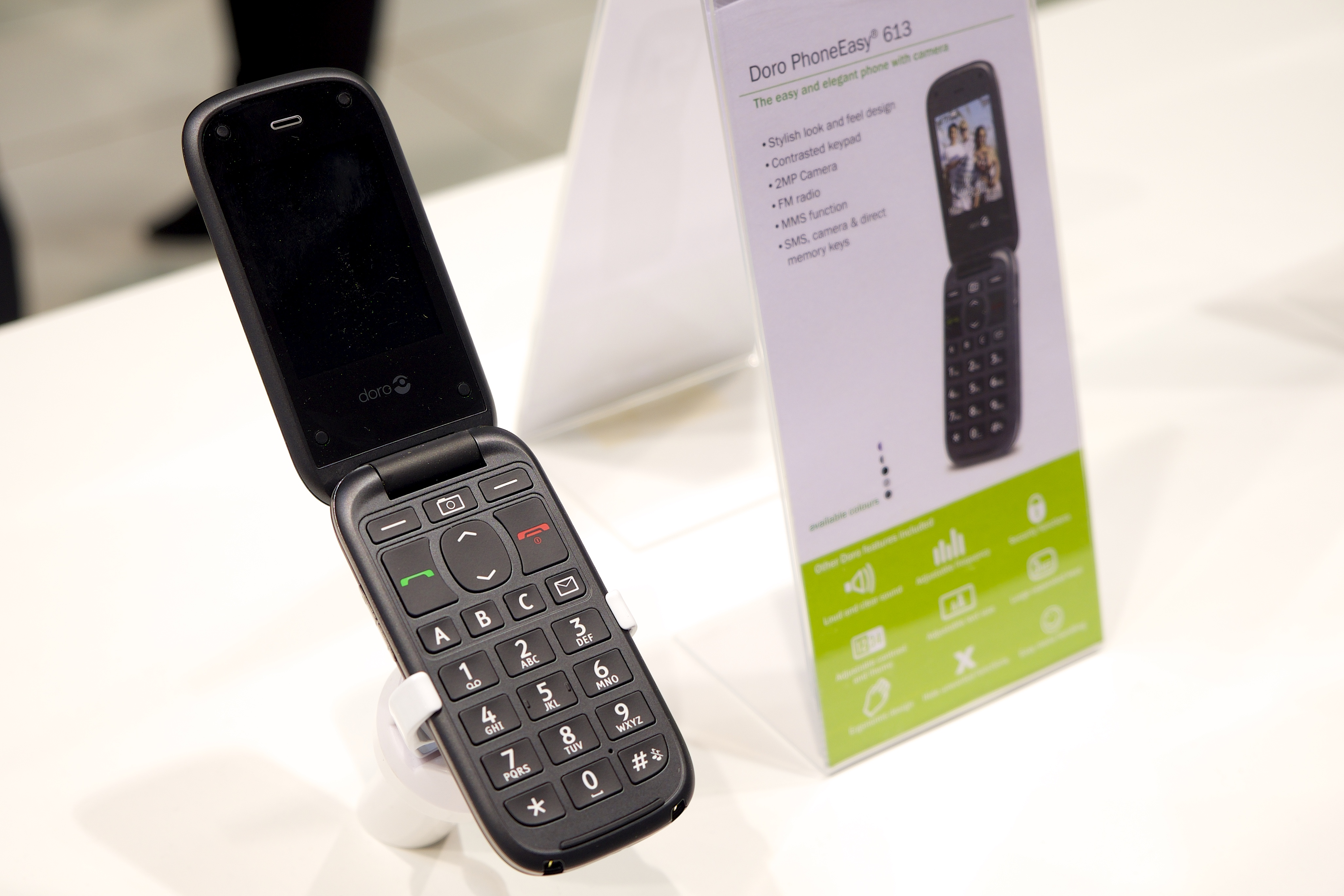
A Doro flip phone released (2015)

Interest in flip phones declined during the late 2000s: this was first due to the growing popularity of sliders, including 'slide-out QWERTYs' that offered a full keyboard in combination with a wider, landscape-oriented display. The typically narrow body of the flip phone was a design constraint for incorporating a QWERTY. It was also affected by the growing popularity of touchscreen-operated phones which started to be considered as more intuitive to use compared to traditional keypads. The flip phone – designed in mind with a display on the upper part and a keypad on the lower part – was impractical for use with a touch display (which could also incorporate QWERTY virtual keyboards), so it fell out of favor when touchscreens became standard at the end of the decade.

== Contemporary use ==
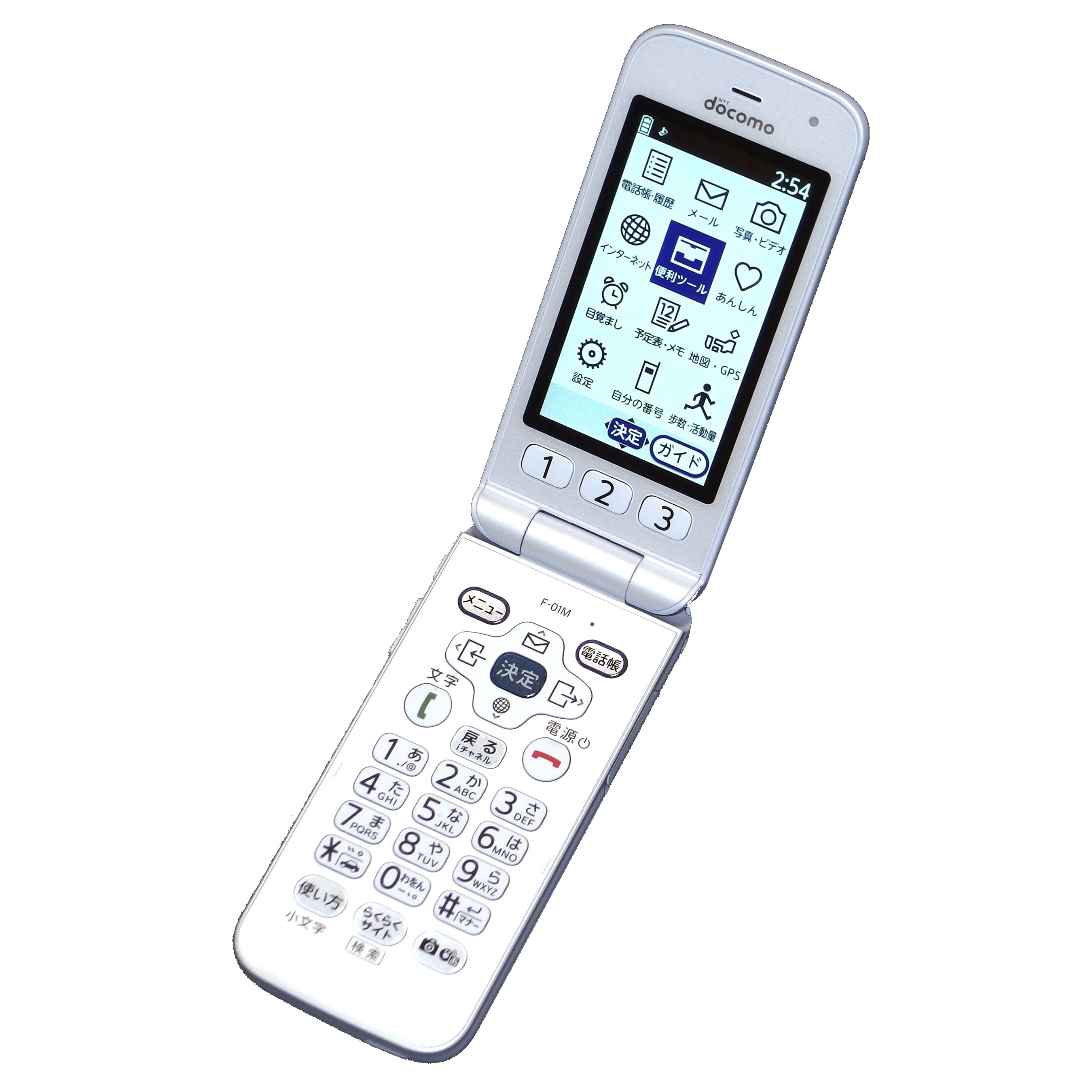
Samsung Galaxy Z Flip foldable smartphones and NTT Docomo F-01M Raku-Raku phone (2019)

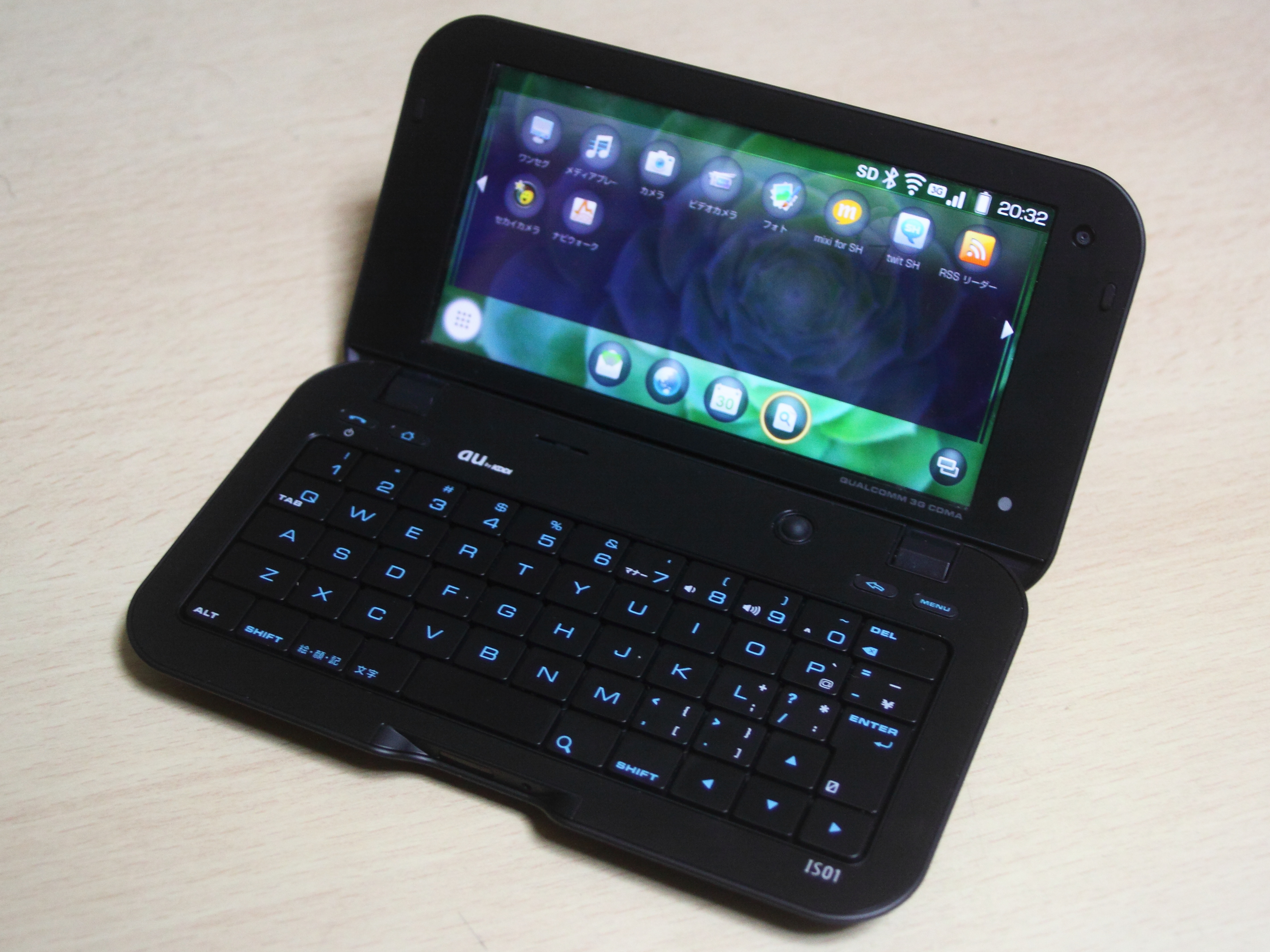
Sharp IS01 smartphone by Naoto Fukasawa for KDDI au (2010)

While flip phones had become largely obsolete in the 2010s, it was noticeably still relevant to a degree in Japan where various such products continued to be developed and offered by carriers such as KDDI au and NTT Docomo. Outside these territories, flip phones continued to be marketed as a niche by some manufacturers (such as Alcatel, Doro, Kyocera, LG and Samsung), typically as cheap, basic feature phones that remain popular among specialized audiences who prefer their simplicity or durability over smartphones.

In 2019, a new style of flip phones began to emerge using rollable OLED displays, most often referred to as "foldable smartphones". These also overlap with the slate form factor. Motorola unveiled the new Motorola Razr in November 2019, the first major product in this style, which uses a foldable display and a clamshell design reminiscent of its namesake line of feature phones. Samsung released the Galaxy Z Flip, and the series has since expanded. Not all "foldable smartphones", however, are clamshell: the company's Galaxy Fold, for example, uses a book-like vertical fold instead of a clamshell design.

== See also ==
- Dual-touchscreen
- Foldable smartphone
- Form factor (mobile phones)
- History of mobile phones
- Mobile Phone Museum
