= Light Flip =

Mobile phone

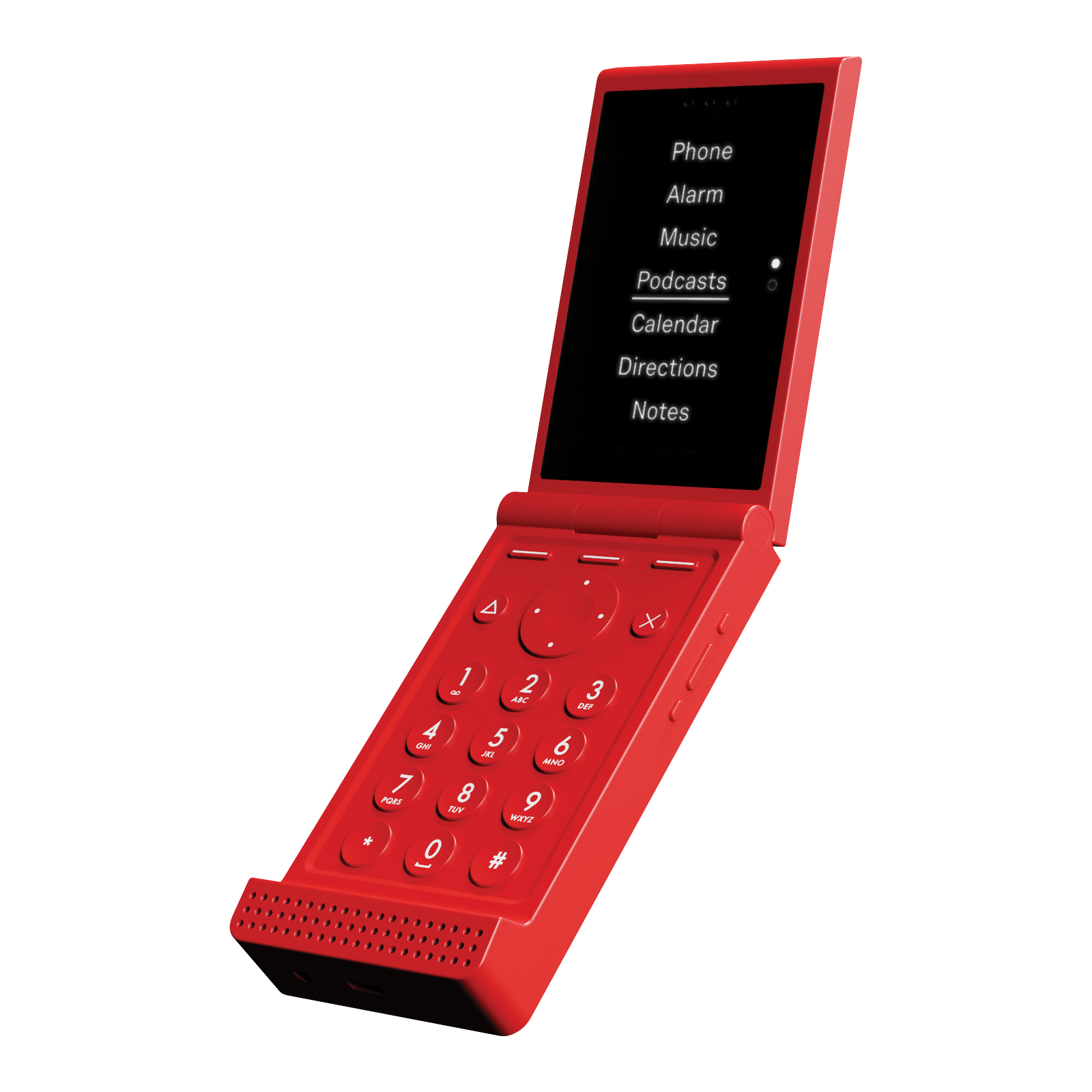
- Manufacturer: Light Phone
- Type: Dumbphone
- Form factor: Flipphone
- Website: thelightphone.com/lightflip

The Light Flip is a minimalist mobile phone produced by Light Phone. It will be released to the public in April 2027.

== Background ==
Light Phone produces minimalist mobile phones that are designed to combat smartphone addiction. Their first product was released in 2017, the Light Phone II in 2019, and the Light Phone III in 2025.

The company stated that the Light Flip was designed in response to feedback about their Light Phone III. This feedback, especially from younger users, stated that the model still seemed too similar to a smartphone, due to features such as its touchscreen. Many members of Gen Z have taken an interest in using "dumb phones", phones with limited features compared to smart phones. According to over two dozen Gen Z "dumb phone" users interviewed by the company, the dumb phones produced by contemporary makers like HMD or TCL often break and lack easy access to repairs. They are described as "ugly", "stupid", with software that is not updated, and include social media, which the users want to avoid. The older devices they might like to use cannot work on major mobile networks. With the hope of meeting this strong demand, the company designed the Light flip to appear similar to the Ericsson and Motorola phones that were popular in the late 1990s and early 2000s. Wired called this new phone the "stylish dumb flip phone of your dreams." The company designed the phone to prioritize calling, which they believe is the best way to communicate with a mobile phone.

The Light Flip costs $299 and will be shipped out in April 2027. Kaiwei Tang, the co-founder of the company, believes that simply buying a Light Phone is not a "magic pill" to solve addiction to smartphones, instead advocating for its use as part of a planned detransition process. To help users who have not used a flip phone before prepare for the adjustment, preorder customers are enrolled in the "Flip Your Life" program. It includes blogs, a newsletter, and a community hub that connects users with each other. The company recommends social media blocking tools like Brick to help transition.

== Design and features ==
The Light Flip is made of plastic, available in red, navy, pink, black, yellow, and light gray. Unlike many flip phones, it does not have a screen on its front, but does have an LED that flashes when messages are received. It has a 2.8-inch OLED display, a 50 megapixel camera, stereo speakers, and two microphones. The 1,800-mAh battery is replaceable. It utilizes the MediaTek MT8873 processor, has 6GB of RAM, and 128GB of storage.

It is navigated with a D-pad, three function keys, and confirm and cancel button. Text can be typed using predictive T9 typing. It has connectivity with 5G and 4LTE, Wi-Fi, USB-C, and Bluetooth. It includes a 3.5mm AUX headphone jack. Either a Nano SIM or eSIM can be used.

Applications on the company LightOS system, called "tools" by Light Phone, such as alarm, calendar, calculator, and directions, available on the Light Phone III, will work on the Light Flip.
