= Pureness =

Pureness may refer to:

- Purity (disambiguation)
- "Pureness" (Aya Ueto song)
- "Pureness" (Nana Kitade song)
- Sony Ericsson Xperia Pureness, a design-focused mobile phone, released in 2009.
