= MTM =

MTM may refer to:

== Computing ==
- Microsoft Test Manager, a diagnostic software tool

== Science, technology, medicine and engineering ==
- Massive Thirring Model, in quantum field theory
- Medication Therapy Management, pharmaceutical care by pharmacists
- Mercury Transfer Module, the power and propulsion segment of the BepiColombo spacecraft
- Methods-time measurement, a motion time system
- Methyltrimethoxysilane, an organosilicon compound
- Midwoofer-tweeter-midwoofer, a loudspeaker configuration
- Model–test–model, in military combat modelling
- Modified Transverse Mercator coordinate system, used in Eastern Canada
- Motoren Technik Mayer, Wettstetten, Germany, a car tuner
- Mountaintop removal mining
- Methylthiomethyl ether, chemical compound
- X-linked myotubular myopathy, a form of centronuclear myopathy

== Entertainment ==
- MTM Enterprises, Mary Tyler Moore's production company
  - MTM Records, a MTM Enterprises record label
- MTM (band), a Portuguese band

== Transport ==
- Martin Mill railway station, Dover, Kent, England; National Rail station code
- Metlakatla Seaplane Base, Metlakatla, Alaska; IATA airport code and FAA location identifier
- Metro Trains Melbourne, operator of the commuter train network in Melbourne, Victoria
- Metland Telagamurni railway station, a railway station in Bekasi Regency, Indonesia

== Other ==
- Ibanez MTM, a guitar brand
- Made-to-measure clothing
- MaineToday Media, media company
- Mark-to-market accounting in economics
- Max the Mutt College of Animation, Art & Design, Toronto, Ontario
- Media Technology Monitor, a Canadian survey
- Minnesota Transportation Museum, Saint Paul, Minnesota
- Momentum, a financial indicator
- Monster Truck Madness, a racing video game
- A variant of the MT explosive motorboat, an Italian Royal Navy World War II motorboat designed to ram moored ships
- The Swedish Agency for Accessible Media (Swedish: Myndigheten för tillgängliga medier)

== See also ==
- M2M (disambiguation)
