= Motorola V70 =

Flip phone by Motorola released in 2002

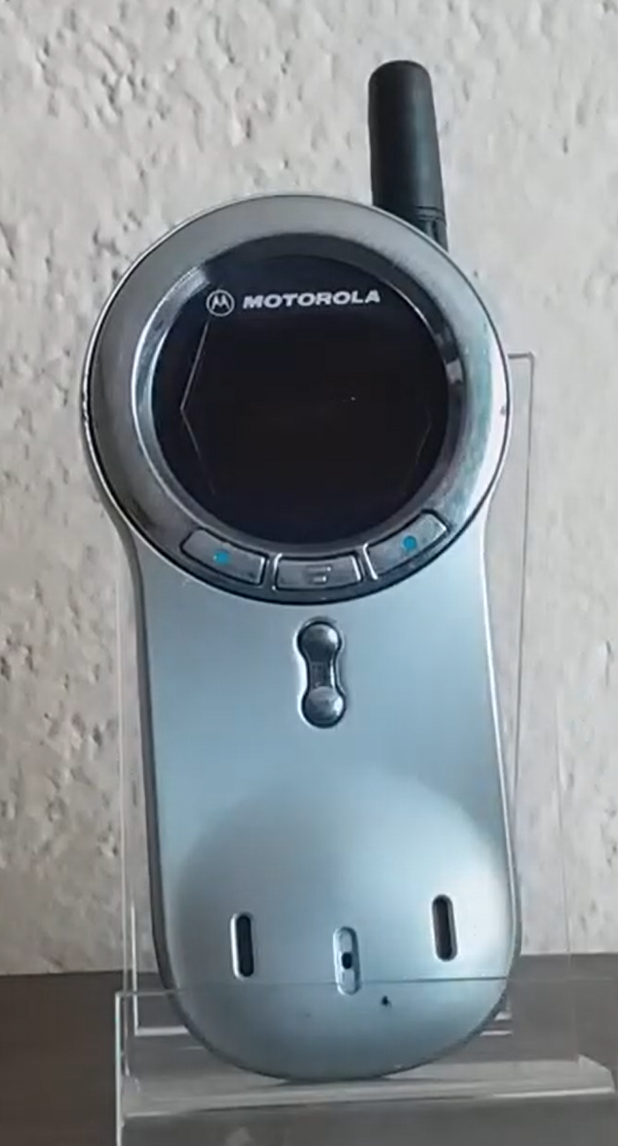
- Developer: Motorola
- Type: Mobile phone
- Series: V series
- First released: 2002; 24 years ago
- Related: Motorola V60; Motorola Aura R1
- Form factor: Swivel
- Dimensions: 94 mm (3.7 in) H 38 mm (1.5 in) W 18 mm (0.71 in) D
- Weight: 83 g (2.9 oz)
- Display: 96x64 px
- Data inputs: Keypad

Motorola V70, codenamed Hummingbird, is a luxury mobile phone developed by Motorola, announced and released in 2002. The phone featured a remarkable 'Swivel' form factor with a circular face and rotating chassis that opens up 180 degrees. This design is seen to have been unique and one pioneered by Motorola.

As opposed to the majority of mobile phones of its time, the Motorola V70 has a surface made of polished metal as opposed to plastic. The back cover too is made of real polished aluminium, just like the Motorola V60. The buttons are also made of metal.

Other than its unique form factor and luxurious look, the V70 is a dual-band GSM/GPRS phone with WAP. It has a blue colored electro-luminescent keypad. The display is reversed monochrome white on black. Motorola V70 has other basic features such as text messaging, vibration, and three games. It was first released in China and other Asian territories in March 2002. In the US it was carried by T-Mobile US and AT&T. In Canada it was carried by Rogers AT&T Wireless and released on June 22, 2002.

The V70 was remarkedly unorthodox in relation to Motorola's reputation. The company had been struggling for years against Nokia and their 'exciting' handsets, and the V70 was Motorola's most striking response. The phone received considerable attention due to its looks, although its sales were reportedly lukewarm, but it was considered a halo product for the future hit RAZR V3. Motorola developed a second phone with a rotating 'swivel' design, released in 2004 as Motorola V80 - its internal specifications are otherwise almost identical to the Motorola V600 flip phone. The swivel form factor was later also adopted by Sony Ericsson in some of their models (such as S700 and W600) as well as Nokia (7370) and Samsung (F210).

In 2008, Motorola released the Aura, a luxury phone that was inspired by the V70.
