= Brick phone =

Brick phone is a slang term and may refer to:

- A specific form factor of large and heavy brick-like portable cell phones common in the 1980s and early 90s
- A term used to refer to more recent but basic feature phones
