= Samsung SGH-A777 =

Samsung mobile phone

Samsung A777
- Samsung SGH-A777 phone in Blue
- Brand: Samsung
- Manufacturer: Samsung
- First released: November 2008
- Predecessor: Samsung SGH-A737
- Compatible networks: GSM (850/900/1800/1900 MHz); HSDPA (850/1900 MHz)
- Form factor: Slider
- Colors: Blue, Red, Orange, Green
- Dimensions: 102 mm (4.0 in) H, 48 mm (1.9 in) W, 14 mm (0.55 in) D
- Weight: 96 g (3.4 oz)
- Memory: 50 MB internal
- Storage: microSDHC (dedicated slot)
- Battery: Removable Li-Ion 880 mAh
- Rear camera: 1.3 MP
- Front camera: No
- Display: 2.3 in (58 mm) TFT LCD, 256K colors Resolution: 176 x 220 pixels (~122 ppi density)
- Connectivity: Bluetooth 2.0 (A2DP), proprietary USB
- Development status: Discontinued

The Samsung SGH-A777 is a slider feature phone manufactured and designed by Samsung. It was released in November 2008 for the AT&T carrier.

It was part of the Boeing series, as well with the other mobile phones.

== Specifications ==
The SGH-A777 houses a removable Li-Ion 880 mAh battery providing a talk time of 3 hours and 16 minutes and 12 days of stand-by. It has a SAR rating of 1.19 W per kg. On the rear, it has a 1.3-megapixel camera and in the front, it displays a TFT display sizing at 2.3 inches. It has a microSDHD card slot.

It supports Cellular Video wireless service that access streaming-video content and AT&T Mobile Music, an XM Radio Mobile for music radio, a Music ID application, a Billboard Mobile channel, music videos, and a community section as well.
