= Huawei Pal =

- Manufacturer: Huawei
- Type: Feature phone
- First released: November 2013 (MetroPCS)
- Form factor: Candybar
- Color: Black
- Dimensions: 111 mm (4.4 in) H, 47 mm (1.9 in) W, 14 mm (0.55 in) D
- Weight: 75 g (2.6 oz)
- CPU: 230 MHz single-core
- Memory: 128 MB ROM
- Storage: 0.06 GB
- Battery: 800 mAh
- Display: 1.8-inch TFT LCD
- Sound: 3.5 mm jack, earpiece
- Connectivity: Micro-USB, GPS/A-GPS
- Data inputs: Numeric keypad, soft keys, D-pad, music control keys

The Huawei Pal (U2800) is a feature phone released in November 2013 by MetroPCS, and was manufactured and branded by Huawei. It was 2 key pad shortcuts to a feature on both sides.

It was considered as lowest-scoring phone of 2013 from a "dubious honor."

== Features ==
- 1.8-inch TFT display
- 800 mAh battery
- Single speaker at the back
- microUSB on the left side
