= M2M =

M2M may refer to:

== Entertainment ==
- Mission to Mars (attraction) at Walt Disney World's Magic Kingdom, Florida USA
  - Mission to Mars (2000), a science fiction film inspired by the attraction
- M2M (band), Norwegian pop duo
- Married to Medicine, Atlanta-based Bravo reality tv show

== Technology ==
- M2M (Eclipse), an implementation of the Object Management Group's QVT standard for model transformation
- Machine to machine, direct communication between devices
- Many-to-many (data model), as an entity-relationship model
- Mobile-to-mobile convergence
- Mobile-to-mobile, a classification of phone call on some mobile phone plans

== Other uses ==
- Man-to-man defense, a defensive tactic used in a variety of sports
- mothers2mothers, an international nonprofit organization dedicated to preventing mother-to-child transmission of HIV

== See also ==
- MTM (disambiguation)
