= Samsung Freeform =

Samsung R350/R351 Freeform
- Also known as: Samsung LINK
- Brand: Samsung
- Manufacturer: Samsung Electronics
- Type: Feature phone
- First released: August 2009; 16 years ago
- Availability by region: August 2009
- Discontinued: Yes
- Successor: Samsung Freeform II
- Compatible networks: CDMA, CDMA2000 1x
- Form factor: Slate
- Dimensions: 112 mm × 61 mm × 13 mm (4.41 in × 2.40 in × 0.51 in)
- Weight: 103 g (3.6 oz)
- Operating system: Proprietary
- Storage: 55 MB
- Removable storage: microSD (dedicated slot)
- Battery: Removable Li-Ion 1000 mAh
- Rear camera: 1.3 MP
- Front camera: No
- Display: 2.2 in (56 mm) TFT LCD, 256K colors 220 x 176 pixels (~128 ppi)
- Sound: Loudspeaker, 2.5 mm audio jack
- Media: MP4, H.263, MP3, AAC+
- Connectivity: Bluetooth 2.0 (A2DP), microUSB 2.0, GPS (A-GPS)
- Data inputs: QWERTY keyboard
- SAR: Head: 1.01 W/kg, Body: 0.53 W/kg

The Samsung Freeform is a feature phone manufactured and branded by Samsung Electronics and was released in August 2009 and September 2009 for the Alltel carrier. It features a 1.3-megapixel rear-camera, a QWERTY keypad, a 2.5-mm audio jack, a stiff design, and a removable 1000 mAh battery.

== Features ==
- SMS, MMS, and Email messaging
- WAP 2.0/xHTML for browsing
- Games and Java apps, with MIDP 2.0
- Available at Black and Red colors

== Camera ==
The camera comes in multiple resolutions:

- 1,280 x 960 (highest)
- 640 x 480
- 320 x 240
- 176 x 144 (lowest)

It also comes with three quality settings, five white balance presets and color effects, night mode and 4 shot modes.
