= Mudita Kompakt =

Minimalist mobile phone

- Developer: Mudita Sp z o.o.
- Type: Feature phone
- First released: May 2025; 1 year ago
- Compatible networks: 4G LTE, 3G UMTS/HSPA, 2G GSM/EDGE
- Form factor: Slate
- Operating system: MuditaOS K

Mudita Kompakt is a mobile phone developed by Mudita that was released in 2025. The phone was designed with the intention of digital detox and reducing distractions, and makes use of a touchscreen electronic paper display, specifically E Ink. It runs on the company's self made MuditaOS K operating system based on Android.

The phone was announced on 24 January 2024 by Polish company Mudita which was cofounded by Michał Kiciński (cofounder of CD Projekt Red). This was their second mobile phone after the Mudita Pure candybar-style phone released in 2021. The Mudita Kompakt was successfully crowdfunded through Kickstarter from October 2024.

== Software ==
The Mudita Kompakt runs an operating system called MutidaOS K, tailor designed for this model. As opposed to MuditaOS (on the Mudita Pure which was built on FreeRTOS) MutidaOS K is based on Android Open Source Project version 12. As a result, it does not contain Google Play Services.

By default, the Kompakt software is preloaded with "essential" utilities and apps such as a note-taking app, an e-reader, a music player, offline maps (using OpenStreetMap data), weather and an SMS text messenger. It does not ship with a web browser or email client. APK binaries can be transferred to the phone using a computer allowing it to install and run third-party Android apps.

Mutida showcased MuditaOS K 2.0 in September 2026 which adds an app manager (for sideloaded third-party apps), an optional text-only launcher, a curated store for E-Ink optimised utilities called InkApps, and Google Calendar syncing.

== Hardware ==
The phone's E-Ink display has a size of 4.3" and resolution of 800x480 pixels. It runs on a MediaTek chipset and contains 3GB of memory, 32GB of internal storage memory (expandable using MicroSD), Bluetooth, NFC and Wi-Fi networking. There is also a 3.5mm headphone jack and an 8 megapixel rear camera.

As part of its privacy and digital detox focus, the Mudita Kompakt also has a hardware "kill switch" that instantly disables networking features, the camera and microphones.

== Reception ==
The phone was noted by reviewers for its unusual incorporation of an electronic ink display, and has been compared with the niche Russian made Yotaphone.

Matthew Miller of ZDNET recommended the Mudita Kompakt as an "affordable choice" for those "investing in a so-called “dumbphone”" although called the addition of a camera as an "unnecessary element". Scott Kramer of Forbes wrote that he can't see himself using this kind of phone but felt that it could be right for the elderly, or children whose parents want a safe mobile phone, although commented that it is "pricey". Tech site AndroidPolice.com gave praise to the custom operating system on the Mudita Kompakt, comparing it to another current E-Ink phone namely the Onyx Boox Palma 2 Pro, arguing that stock Android (on the Palma) "is not built for e-paper displays" while at the same time thinking that Mudita's software is not suitable for "mainstream use".

German magazine Chip were impressed by the Kompakt's physical offline switch and battery life, but noted that the price felt happig ("steep"). A quick overview by British newspaper The Independent commented positively on the "5 day" battery life, its body and clear display, but that the camera "needs work". On the other hand, The Telegraph was more positive about the Mudita Kompakt's camera but criticised the "frustrating" slow screen response; it considered the Kompakt to be a "dumbed-down smartphone" rather than a "dumbphone". The German television channel n-tv called it an ideal "anti-smartphone" but commented on the ghosting of the E-Ink display.

The product won an iF Design Award and Red Dot Design Award in 2025.
