= Dopamine fasting =

Temporary abstinence from addictive technologies

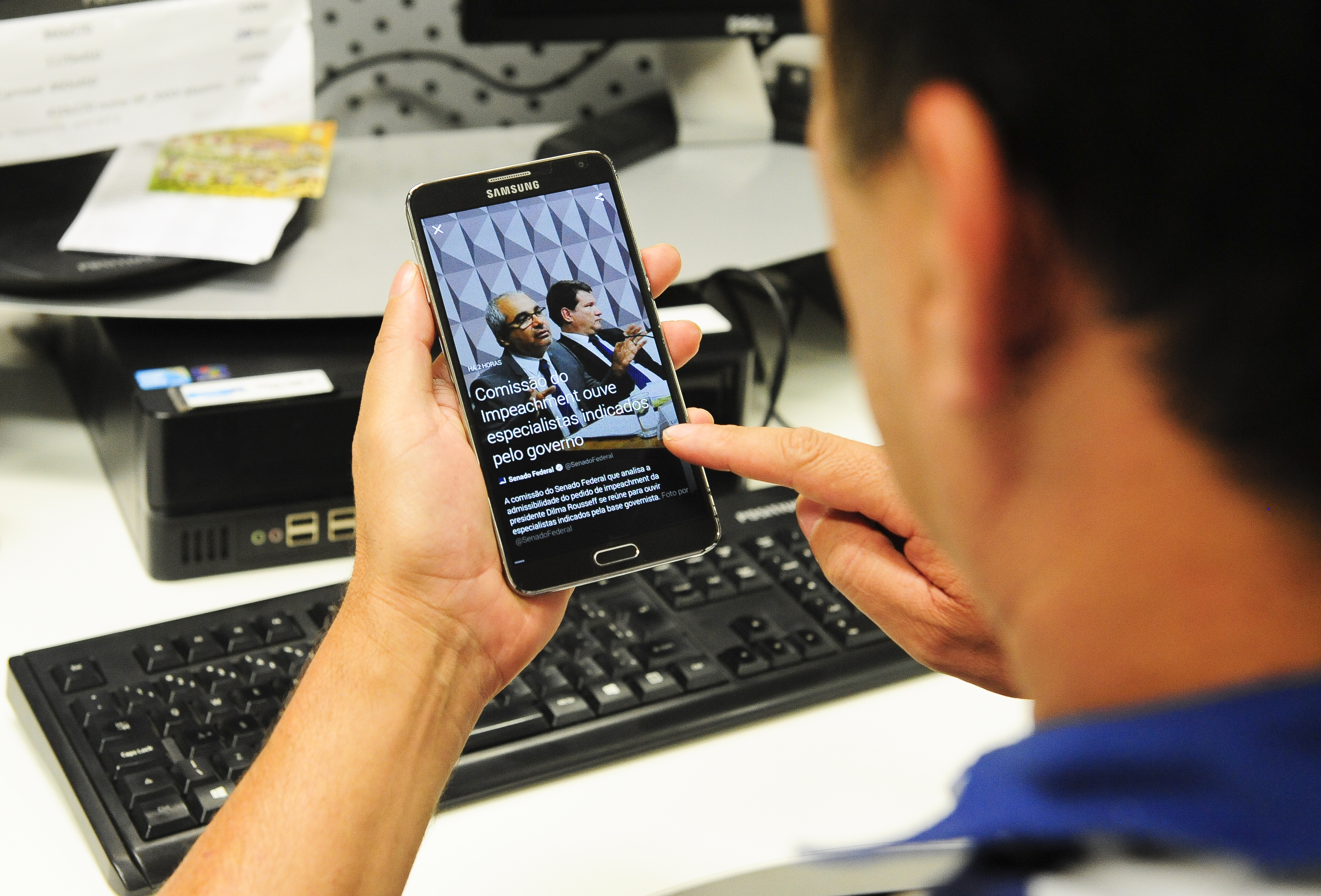
Proponents of dopamine fasting see benefits in taking periodic breaks from technologies which are seen as addictive, such as smartphones.

Dopamine fasting or dopamine detoxing is the general practice of abstaining from any impulsive and behavioral addictions in order to cope with such addictions and thus attempt to reset to a healthier lifestyle. It specifically targets behaviors such as smartphone and social media use, emotional eating, internet use, gaming, gambling, shopping, and pornography or masturbation.

The practice was first developed by California psychologist Dr. Cameron Sepah as a cognitive behavioral therapy (CBT). Dr. Peter Grinspoon describes Sepah's work as "sensible, if not necessarily new or groundbreaking", and criticizes those who have adopted "ever more extreme, ascetic, and unhealthy" versions of it. Grinspoon says that the intended goal for individuals fasting is to not completely eliminate such addictive behaviors but to learn how to maintain their impulsive behavior towards a healthy lifestyle.

Dr. Cameron Sepah has stressed that there have been misinterpretations of what the true value of this type of detox is and how it is supposed to work. Critics say that the overall concept of dopamine fasting is unscientific.

== Definitions ==
Dopamine fasting is not clearly defined, as practices vary widely in what individuals abstain from and how frequently or long they abstain. In general, it focuses on reducing anything that is unhealthy and addictive. Some proponents limit the process to avoiding online technology; others extend it to abstaining from all work, exercise, physical contact and unnecessary conversation.

According to California psychiatrist Dr. Cameron Sepah, a proponent of the practice, the purpose is not to literally reduce dopamine in the body, but rather to reduce impulsive behaviors that are rewarded with it. Ciara McCabe suggests that the practice is about avoiding cues, such as hearing the ring of a smartphone, that can trigger impulsive behaviors, such as remaining on the smartphone after the call to play a game. In one sense, dopamine fasting is a reaction to technology firms that have engineered their services to keep people hooked. It can encourage engagement in less stimulating activities such as reading, crafting, or outdoor sports.

An extreme form of dopamine fasting would be complete sensory deprivation, where all external stimuli are removed to promote a sense of calm and wellbeing.

== Impacts ==
The effects of an overload of one activity can cause the brain's natural dopamine to be imbalanced, producing negative effects on the body and one's mental health.

Proponents of dopamine fasting argue that it is a way to exert greater self-control and self-discipline over one's life, and New York Times technology journalist Nellie Bowles found that dopamine fasting made her subject's everyday life "more exciting and fun".

It has been described as a fad and a craze associated with Silicon Valley. Katie Way for Vice said, "If the idea of abstaining from anything fun in order to increase your mental clarity is appealing, congratulations: You and the notorious biohackers in Silicon Valley are on the same wave."

A clinical psychologist says the "dopamine detox trend" is becoming a popular way for individuals to "unplug and enjoy the simpler things in life".

Clifford Sussman, MD; and Paul Weigle, MD also explain for addictive gaming that "For such patients, turning off their console after an hour of gaming is akin to individuals with alcohol use disorder trying to stop after 1 drink."

A study was conducted in adults (ages 30–45) and the relationships between digital screen time, video gaming, and impulsive behavior. One key finding was that greater screen time was associated with higher impulsivity, particularly in situation of urgency. Another key finding was that these patterns may have implications for mental health in adulthood.

Gambling is also a highly addictive activity that feeds off a dopamine rush, and online sports betting has been a huge influence for addicted gamblers to resist.

== Scientific basis ==
Critics say that the overall concept of dopamine fasting is unscientific, since the chemical plays a vital role in everyday life; literally reducing it would not be good for a person, and removing a particular stimulus like social media would not reduce the levels of dopamine in the body, only the stimulation of it. Ciara McCabe, Associate Professor in Neuroscience at the University of Reading, considers the idea that the brain could be "reset" by avoiding dopamine triggers for a short time to be "nonsense".

Cameron Sepah, who has promoted the practice of dopamine fasting, agrees that the name is misleading and says that its purpose is not to literally reduce dopamine in the body, but rather to reduce the impulsive behaviors that are rewarded by it.

Besides impulsive behavior control, which is regulated by the prefrontal cortex, it has never been conclusively proven that technology use hardens the brain to dopamine’s effects. Technology use induces a dopamine response on par with any normal, enjoyable experience: roughly a 50% to 100% increase. By contrast, heroin, cocaine and amphetamine — three highly addictive drugs — can cause dopamine spikes ranging as high as 300%, 350%, and 1,365% respectively. In addition, dopamine receptors themselves — the cells in the brain activated in different ways by dopamine’s release — respond differently to technology use than they do to substance abuse, with no evidence that they become less sensitive to dopamine with repeated exposure, in the way they do with substance abuse. In the final analysis, it is wrong to assume that avoiding "dopamine spikes" may upregulate dopamine receptors, causing an "increase in motivation or pleasure". Conversely, freeing oneself from bad habits may free up time for healthier habits, like physical activity, leading to actual increases in gray matter volume on multiple brain parts related to the reward system.

== See also ==
- Anhedonia – Inability to feel pleasure
- Delayed gratification – Resistance of an immediate reward in return for a greater reward later
- Digital detox – Process of not using digital devices
- Endorphins – Hormones and neuropeptides
