= John's Phone =

Basic mobile phone

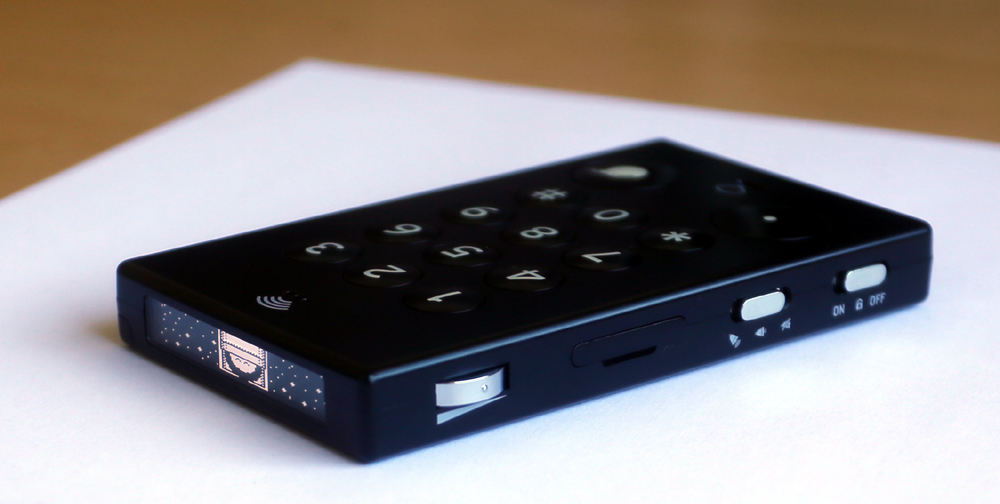
Left side of the phone, showing the volume knob and several sliding buttons

John's Phone is a minimalist quad-band GSM mobile phone released in October 2010, designed and developed by Hein Mevissen and Diederiekje Bok of Dutch advertising and design agency John Doe. It was marketed as being the world's most basic mobile phone, allowing the user only to make and receive calls, with none of the other basic features of modern phones such as text messaging or even a digital address book; phone numbers and addresses are designed to be written on a small physical paper booklet stored on the back of the device. John's Phone was marketed as being ideal for young children, the elderly, and technophobes.

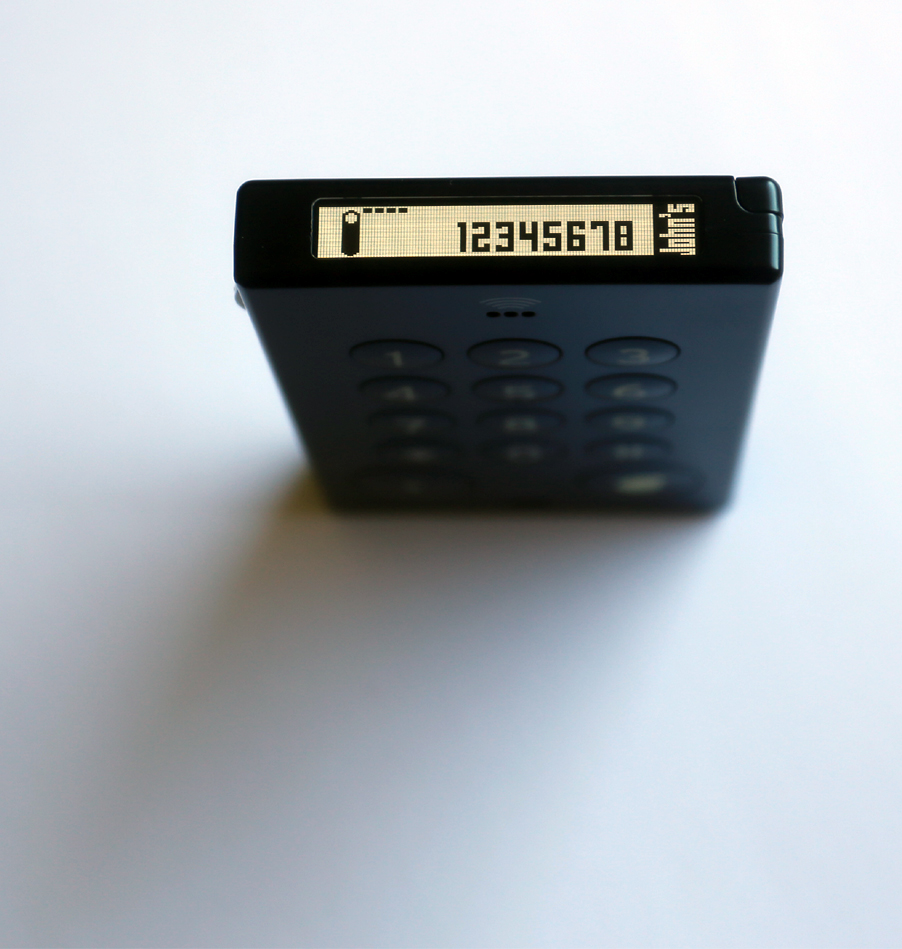
The sole 1-line display of John's Phone, located on the top of the device to display the user inputted number, incoming caller number, and battery level

== Features ==
When the 1,200 mAh battery is full, the display will show the word "JOHNS" along the right. The lower the battery, the fewer letters are displayed. The battery lasts about 3 weeks in standby mode or 6 hours of calling time. The device supports ringing and vibration. Although it has no speakerphone, it does come with an earphone/microphone headset that can be plugged into its micro-USB port. It has a speed dial component, and is able to show caller ID on its screen. The device is not locked, making it compatible with any SIM using the GSM system. The keypad consists of only the numbers 0 to 9, an asterisk, a hash, and the call and end buttons. It includes a 32-page paper address book kept on the back of the handset and a pen that resembles a stylus. The booklet contains tongue-in-cheek "text messaging" and "games" (tic-tac-toe) sections. The designers say that these features allow the phone to be used even when it is turned off.

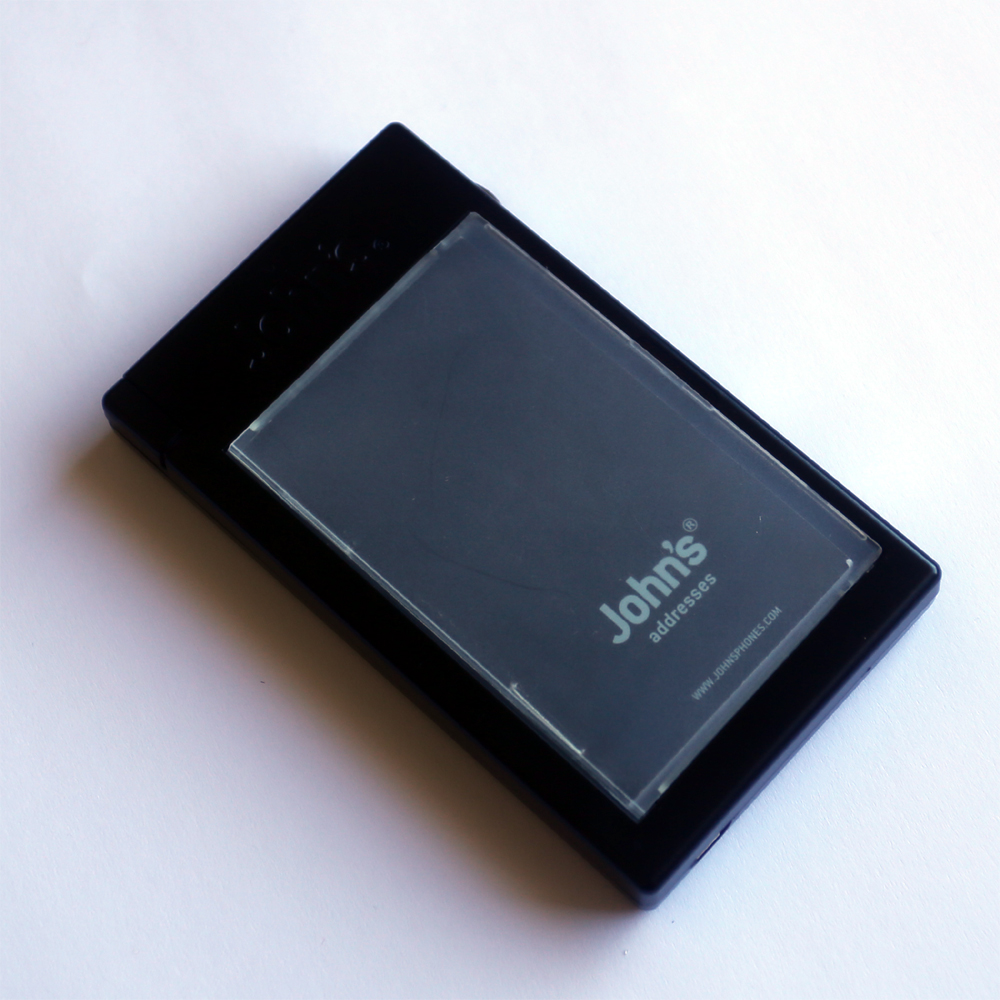
Phone book compartment on the back.

== Reception ==
Although the phone has been promoted as being "the world's simplest phone" and "the anti-smartphone" by the tech media, it has also been criticized for being overpriced for its so-called simplicity, rough plastic construction, and poor ergonomics.

In December 2010, Fast Company selected John's Phone for its "12 of the Year's Best Ideas in Interface Designs" list.

The phone was included in the initial collection of the Museum of Ideas and Innovation in Barcelona (Miba) in Barcelona, Spain, which opened in 2011.
