= Light Phone II =

2019 mobile phone

- Light Phone II (Black)
- Developer: Light
- Manufacturer: Light
- Type: Mobile phone
- Introductory price: US$350 at launch
- Operating system: LightOS
- Memory: 1 GB RAM
- Storage: 8 GB
- Display: 2.84 in E Ink Carta touchscreen
- Input: Touchscreen, physical power/volume buttons
- Connectivity: 4G LTE, Wi-Fi, Bluetooth
- Power: Non-removable battery (950 mAh)
- Dimensions: 95.85 x 55.85 x 8.75mm
- Weight: 78 grams
- Predecessor: Light Phone
- Successor: Light Phone III
- Website: Phone II – Official Site

The Light Phone II is a minimalist mobile phone developed by Light , a Brooklyn-based startup known for designing technology “to be used as little as possible.” It is the successor to the original 2017 Light Phone (1st generation), offering a few more features while maintaining a stripped-down philosophy. The Light Phone III is the successor to the Light Phone II, adding cameras, a fingerprint sensor, and an AMOLED screen. The Light Phone II deliberately omits an application store, web browser, email client, or social media apps. At launch, the phone’s only built-in tools were calling, texting, and an alarm clock. The device is intended as an alternative or companion for those seeking a digital detox from full-featured smartphones.

== History ==
The Light Phone II’s development was funded through an Indiegogo crowdfunding campaign launched in early 2018. The campaign was successful: Light reached $600,000 in contributions within the first 10 hours and went on to raise over $3.5 million from more than 10,000 backers.

This response, with $8.4 million in seed investments from firms like Foxconn and notable angel investors, signalled interest in a feature phone.

== Design and features ==
The Light Phone II has a black-and-white E Ink Carta display, measuring 2.84 inches diagonally. Its matte plastic casing and compact form factor reflect its low-profile aesthetic. The phone weighs 78g and charges via a Micro-USB port.

Its interface is built around a vertical list of "tools"—such as Phone, Messages, Alarm, and Settings—navigable by touchscreen. Later LightOS updates added features including Notes, Calculator, Music Player (MP3), and a basic navigation tool called “Directions.”

Unlike typical smartphones, the Light Phone II does not support app downloads, web browsing, or email. Its design philosophy centers around digital minimalism and reducing screen time.

== Software ==
The Light Phone II runs LightOS, a proprietary operating system developed by Light, based on Android. It uses a heavily customized interface and blocks access to the Google Play Store and third-party apps.

== Reception ==
Reception of the Light Phone II was mixed. Reviewers praised its concept and aesthetic, but many noted limitations in usability, particularly around slow performance and lack of features. TIME named the Light Phone II one of the 100 Best Inventions of 2019.

Critics praised the Light Phone II’s minimalist concept as a way to curb smartphone overuse, but reviewers noted drawbacks such as a sluggish interface and the difficulty of typing on its small screen.

== Legacy ==
Despite its narrow market appeal, the Light Phone II played a significant role in popularizing the concept of digital minimalism in personal technology. It is frequently cited alongside devices like the Punkt MP02 and Mudita Pure as a leading example of “dumb phones” aimed at reducing digital dependency. Light continued to evolve the platform with the release of the Light Phone III in 2025, adding a camera and faster hardware while retaining the same minimalist ethos.

== See also ==
- Digital detox
- Smartphone addiction
- E Ink
- LightOS
