= MT6235 =

Mobile phone processor by MediaTek

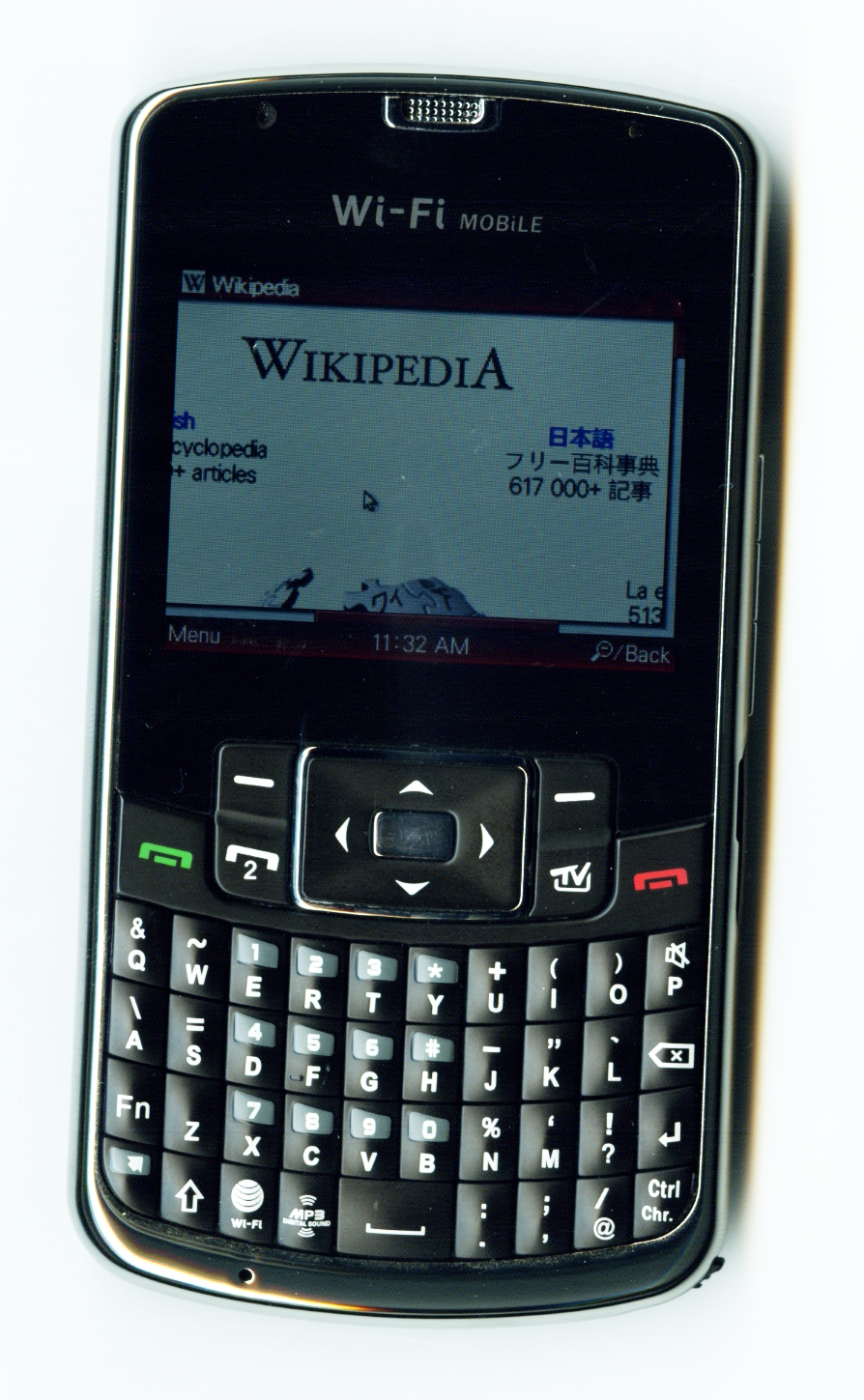
Star C6000 is a mobile phone that uses the MT6235 platform

The MT6235 is a processor used in many Chinese cellular phones (eg. ZTE). It is a member of the MT62xx series of processors by MediaTek.

MediaTek-based Chinese cell phones often come with features not common to North American phones, such as analog television viewing and recording. While these feature phones have vastly different builds and configurations, they all run Mediatek's proprietary operating system based on the Nucleus RTOS.

The MT6235 is a specialized processor design containing both an ARM926EJ-S RISC CPU running at frequencies between 26/52/104 and 208 MHz and a digital signal processor (DSP).

== Subsystems ==
- Microcontroller Unit (MCU) Subsystem: includes an ARM926EJ-S RISC processor and its accompanying memory management and interrupt handling logics;
- Digital Signal Processor (DSP) Subsystem: includes a DSP and its accompanying memory, memory controller, and interrupt controller;
- MCU/DSP Interface: the junction at which the MCU and the DSP exchange hardware and software information;
- Microcontroller Peripherals: includes all user interface modules and RF control interface modules;
- Microcontroller Coprocessors: runs computing-intensive processes in place of the Microcontroller;
- DSP Peripherals: hardware accelerators for GSM/GPRS/EDGE channel codec;
- Multi-media Subsystem: integrates several advanced accelerators to support multi-media applications;
- Voice Front End: the data path for converting analog speech to and from digital speech;
- Audio Front End: the data path for converting stereo audio from an audio source;
- Baseband Front End: the data path for converting a digital signal to and from an analog signal from the RF modules;
- Timing Generator: generates the control signals related to the TDMA frame timing; and,
- Power, Reset and Clock Subsystem: manages the power, reset, and clock distribution inside MT6235.

== Sources ==
- http://ryan.com.br/smf/index.php?topic=481.75;wap2
- http://blog.csdn.net/sergeycao/archive/2008/08/26/2832568.aspx
- MT6235 GSM GPRS Baseband Processor Data Sheet_1.02.pdf
- https://web.archive.org/web/20160215061959/http://www.mediatek.com/en/products/mobile-communications/feature-phone/mt6235/
