= Sidephone =

Minimalist mobile phone

The Sidephone SP-01 is a mobile phone developed by Side Technologies Inc. that was released in 2026. It is a candybar-style phone with a touchscreen display on the upper half and a modular hot swappable slot on the lower half that can take in various different input methods. It runs on a customized version of Android (AOSP) and was designed in mind to be an anti-distraction, pro-digital detox device with basic smart features.

== Hardware ==
Sidephone SP-01 has a relatively small 2.8-inch touchscreen LCD display with a resolution of 640x480. It has 64GB of non-expandable storage, 4GB of RAM, and a 13 megapixel rear camera although no secondary camera. It is powered by a MediaTek chipset with a cellular modem for 4G LTE connectivity.

Underneath the operating display lies the open slot for the modular mechanism, consisting of pogo pin electronic contacts paired with neodymium magnets. The removable tiles built to be used with Sidephone are namely: a classic 4x3 layout keypad, a compact multi-letter QWERTY, an iPod click wheel inspired keypad, and a game controller. The compact QWERTY tile has been compared to the older SureType of BlackBerry. This modular concept in cell phones has been envisioned before in Google's Project Ara and the Fairphone, but Sidephone's philosophy is for adapting and using a phone more intentionally (instead of upgradability or self-repair of the other two products).

== Software ==
The phone is based on the open source Android platform (AOSP), so therefore does not run or ship with Google Mobile Services. Internally also referred to as "Side OS", it is a proprietary operating system built on AOSP version 12. Out of the box the Sidephone SP-01 comes with just nine default system utilities consisting of basics like calling, texting and using the built-in camera.

The company curates bundles of "essential" basic tools and apps called App Packs. These packs may include the likes of mapping (the device has GPS), a voice recorder, instant messaging, email client, and audio streaming apps. Outside the App Packs, users may freely install APK binaries to the device (i.e. "sideloading" Android apps).

== History ==
The Sidephone was developed by a Toronto-based startup cofounded by Canadian product designer Chris Ristovski and American software developer Sebastian Snell. They revealed the initial production design of the phone in April 2025, including renders of the swappable keypad concept (at this time only consisting of a 4x3 keypad without D-pad, a nine grid layout, and a larger keyboard) and reportedly attracted about 10,000 users who were interested in the project and put on the pre-order waitlist. The project was developed transparently using Reddit where the duo documented every stage of development.

Initially the company reported shipments to start by September of that year. However the product was delayed and did not begin shipping until February 2026 for early American customers, with a global rollout starting to ship from June 2026.

== Reception ==
Andy Boxall of Android Police called the Sidephone a "fun" device that does "something different" than the norm. Henry Burrell of the Daily Express liked the "small" size of the phone allowing it to be used with one hand, "Unlike many modern flip style dumbphones", and felt that it achieves the goal set by the developers.

Mathieu Grumiaux of French magazine Clubic lauded the Sidephone, commenting that the hardware and physical modular keypads were a breath of fresh air and that the product returns l’audace ("boldness") to the mobile phone industry. He also praised the developers' proximity and openness online. On the other hand, the Polish-language edition of Chip magazine wrote that while the Sidephone's physical limitations are its biggest advantage, lack of a headphone jack is a weak point and expressed doubt whether the phone can serve as a permanent "digital detox".
