= Sony Ericsson Xperia Pureness =

2009 mobile phone model

- Brand: Sony Ericsson
- Manufacturer: Sony Ericsson
- Type: Feature phone
- Series: Xperia
- First released: November 2009; 16 years ago (Announced November 2009)
- Availability by region: 2009, November
- Compatible networks: GSM / HSPA
- Form factor: Bar
- Color: Black
- Dimensions: 102 mm (4.0 in) H 43 mm (1.7 in) W 13 mm (0.51 in) D
- Weight: 70 g (2.5 oz)
- Operating system: Sony Ericsson proprietary
- Memory: 2 GB internal
- Removable storage: No
- SIM: Mini-SIM
- Battery: Non-removable Li-Po battery Stand-by: Up to 350 h (2G) / 350 h (3G); Talk time: Up to 8 h 30 min (2G) / 3 h 30 min (3G)
- Rear camera: None
- Front camera: None
- Display: 1.8 in, Transparent monochrome, 240 × 320 px (~222 ppi), Scratch-resistant glass
- Sound: Loudspeaker; No 3.5 mm jack
- Media: MP3 player
- Connectivity: Bluetooth 2.1 (A2DP); Proprietary USB; Stereo FM radio (RDS); No WLAN
- Data inputs: Keypad; Predictive text input
- Development status: Discontinued
- Other: Concierge service; TrackID; Voice memo

The Sony Ericsson Xperia Pureness, released in November 2009, was the first handset to feature a transparent monochrome display. Priced at 1000 USD, it was marketed as luxury design phone and came with 12 months of concierge services. The phone had very limited market release – it was sold in a select handful of stores in just a few countries.

Market reception was mixed or negative. Reviews highlighted its minimalist aesthetic and the transparent screen, but criticized limited features, particularly the lack of a camera, expandable storage, and advanced connectivity. As a result, the handset was regarded more as a fashion accessory than a practical mobile phone. Other design-focused phones like Nokia 8600 Luna, LG GD900 Crystal, LG New Chocolate (BL40), Motorola Aura had significantly better features.
