= Samsung Galaxy Folder 2 =

Smartphone by Samsung

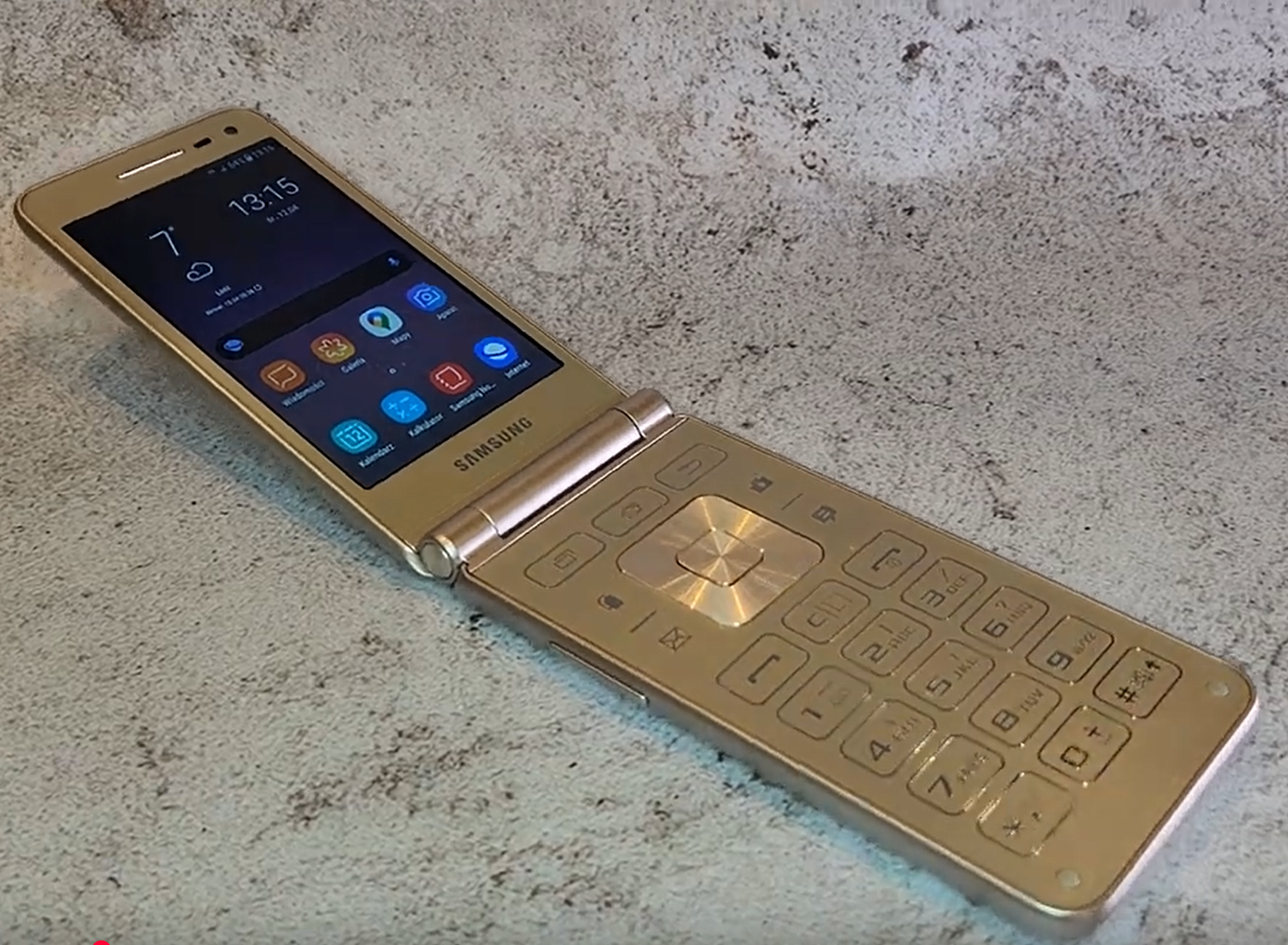
- Samsung Galaxy Folder 2 in gold color
- Also known as: SM-G1650, G1600, G160N, G160W or G165N
- Manufacturer: Samsung Electronics
- Type: Smartphone
- Series: Samsung Galaxy
- First released: September 2016
- Predecessor: Samsung Galaxy Folder
- Compatible networks: GSM, HSPA, LTE
- Form factor: Flip
- Dimensions: 122×60.2×16.1 mm (4.80×2.37×0.63 in)
- Weight: 165 g (6 oz)
- Operating system: Android 6.0.1 "Marshmallow", later upgraded to Android 7.1.1 "Nougat"
- System-on-chip: Qualcomm Snapdragon 425
- CPU: ARM Cortex-A53 1.4 GHz Quad
- GPU: Adreno 308 450 MHz
- Memory: 2 GB
- Storage: 16 GB
- Battery: removable 1950 mAh Li-ion battery
- Charging: USB Micro B
- Rear camera: 8MP f/1.9 with flash
- Front camera: 5MP f/1.9
- Display: 3.8 inch 480x800 TFT LCD
- Connectivity: Wi-Fi b/g/n, Bluetooth 4.2, GPS, microUSB 2.0
- Data inputs: T9 keypad, capacitive touchscreen
- Website: Samsung Galaxy Folder2

The Samsung Galaxy Folder 2 (SM-G1650, G1600, G160N, G160W or G165N) is a clamshell-design smartphone released in September 2016 by Samsung. This device initially launched in China and South Korea with a price of roughly $250, placing it in the lower mid-range smartphone price category. The phone's main feature at the time was its unusual form factor, combining a flip phone with traditional physical telephone keypad with smartphone functionality.

== Reception ==
The Galaxy Folder 2 was often praised for its metallic design and unique form factor, but is also noted as being impractical and possibly overpriced. The device maintains a niche user base among consumers preferring a traditional T9 alphanumeric keypad within a smartphone context. Additionally, it has gained traction on social media platforms such as TikTok, driven by an increasing interest among younger demographics to reduce social media usage and seeking alternatives to modern smartphones.

== Design ==
The Galaxy Folder 2 uses a classic clamshell design (flip phone) form factor. When open, the bottom half features a physical tactile keypad with traditional Android navigation keys, while the top half houses the touchscreen. The phone also has 4 shortcut buttons for contacts, text messages, the camera and social media applications. The chassis of the phone has a sleek, metallic finish on the inside and a reflective plastic surface on the outside. The device was initially released in black and burgundy color options. Between 2016 and 2021, the phone has received multiple design refreshes, adding the colors white, gold and coral pink and changing the design of the d-pad from rectangular to circular.

== Software ==
The device originally launched running Android 6.0 "Marshmallow" layered with Samsung's TouchWiz user interface. The software was specifically optimized to allow users to navigate the operating system and type out messages using either the physical keypad or the touchscreen interchangebly. It was later upgraded to Android 7.1.1 "Nougat".
