= Punkt MP02 =

Mobile phone

The Punkt MP02 is a candybar-style minimalist mobile phone released by Swiss electronics company Punkt in 2018. It uses a monochromatic hardware and software, designed by British designer Jasper Morrison. Compared to its predecessor, Punkt MP01 released in 2015, the MP02 has an upgraded chipset to support 4G networks as well as Wi-Fi networking. It also runs on a stripped down Android-based operating system developed by Punkt. The device was built to be a high-end designer phone but with low-end minimalist technology.
