= Light Phone III =

2025 mobile phone model by Light

- Light Phone III with monochrome AMOLED touchscreen
- Developer: Light (The Light Phone Inc.)
- Manufacturer: Foxconn (contract)
- Product family: Light Phone series
- Type: Feature phone
- Introductory price: US$599
- Operating system: LightOS (Android-based)
- CPU: Qualcomm SM 4450
- Memory: 6 GB LPDDR4X
- Storage: 128 GB (non-expandable)
- Display: 3.92 in AMOLED, 1080×1240 (~419 ppi), monochrome interface
- Sound: Stereo speakers, dual microphones
- Input: Touchscreen, scroll wheel, fingerprint sensor, physical buttons
- Camera: Rear: 50 MP (binned to 12 MP); Front: 8 MP (disabled at launch)
- Connectivity: 5G, 4G LTE, Bluetooth 5.0, GPS, NFC (hardware only)
- Dimensions: 106 × 71.5 × 12 mm
- Weight: 124 g
- Predecessor: Light Phone II
- Website: www.thelightphone.com

The Light Phone III is a minimalist mobile phone developed by Light, a Brooklyn-based startup known for its "designed to be used as little as possible" philosophy. It features a matte black design, a 3.9-inch AMOLED monochrome touchscreen, and a rear-facing 50 MP camera with LED flash. The phone includes a removable back cover secured with screws, allowing access to a user-replaceable battery.

The Light Phone III is a 5G-capable successor to the 2017 Light Phone (1st generation) and the 2019 Light Phone II, and was announced in June 2024. As with earlier models, the Light Phone III is intended as a digital detox tool or alternative to modern smartphones. It offers only essential functions such as calling, texting, music playback, and navigation—deliberately omitting apps such as social media, web browsers, or email clients.

== History ==
The development of the Light Phone III follows Light’s mission to offer phones that reduce dependency on smartphones. The original Light Phone (1st generation) was launched in 2017 as a credit-card-sized 2G GSM device limited to voice calls and preset alarms.

The Light Phone III was officially announced in June 2024, marking the company’s shift away from crowdfunding in favor of direct pre-orders. Shipping of the Light Phone III began in Q1 2025, with general availability by mid-year. Unlike previous devices, it was manufactured in partnership with Foxconn, reflecting Light’s growth and its need to scale production for modern 5G hardware.

Initial pre-order pricing in mid-2024 started as low as $399 for early backers. By late 2024, the price rose to approximately $599. The phone will eventually rise to a final price of $799 after pre-order sales close.

== Features ==
Light Phone III introduced major hardware improvements aimed at addressing user feedback, from earlier models—most notably replacing the slow, low-contrast E Ink screen with a faster monochrome AMOLED panel. According to Light’s CEO, the e-ink screen had been a top complaint among users, particularly when it came to typing or using maps.

The Light Phone III also introduced new hardware not seen in prior models, including:

- Front and rear digital cameras (50 MP main sensor)
- 5G and eSIM support
- USB-C charging
- Fingerprint recognition
- Aluminum chassis and user-serviceable battery

== Software ==
The Light Phone III runs LightOS, a proprietary OS based on a stripped-down Android without Google Mobile Services or typical smartphone features. Notably absent are any general-purpose web browsers, email clients, or app stores. This strict curation reflects Light’s “tools, not apps” approach, designed to minimize digital distraction and the addictive qualities of conventional smartphones.

The monochrome, minimalist interface uses a vertical scrollable list of optional "tools" navigated via touchscreen or physical scroll wheel. Available tools include:

- Phone Dialer
- Messages (SMS/MMS)
- Alarm/Timer
- Calculator
- Calendar
- Camera
- Directions (text/line-based navigation via GPS)
- Directory (Contacts)
- Hotspot
- Music (MP3 player)
- Notes
- Podcasts
- Album (Gallery)

As of 2025, the company maintains that the Light Phone will “never” support social networking services, traditional web browsing, or ad-driven content platforms. This position reflects Light’s commitment to a device intended to be “used as little as possible”—offering only the essential software needed to support intentional use.

The company announced in 2026 that it would release a software development kit for LightOS in the summer and allow users to create 'Tools' that could be shared with other users after being vetted. Light is also building more Tools itself including one to allow users to use Signal.

== See also ==
- Light Phone I
- Feature phone
- Smartphone addiction
