= Motorola Aura =

Luxury mobile phone by Motorola

Motorola Aura R1

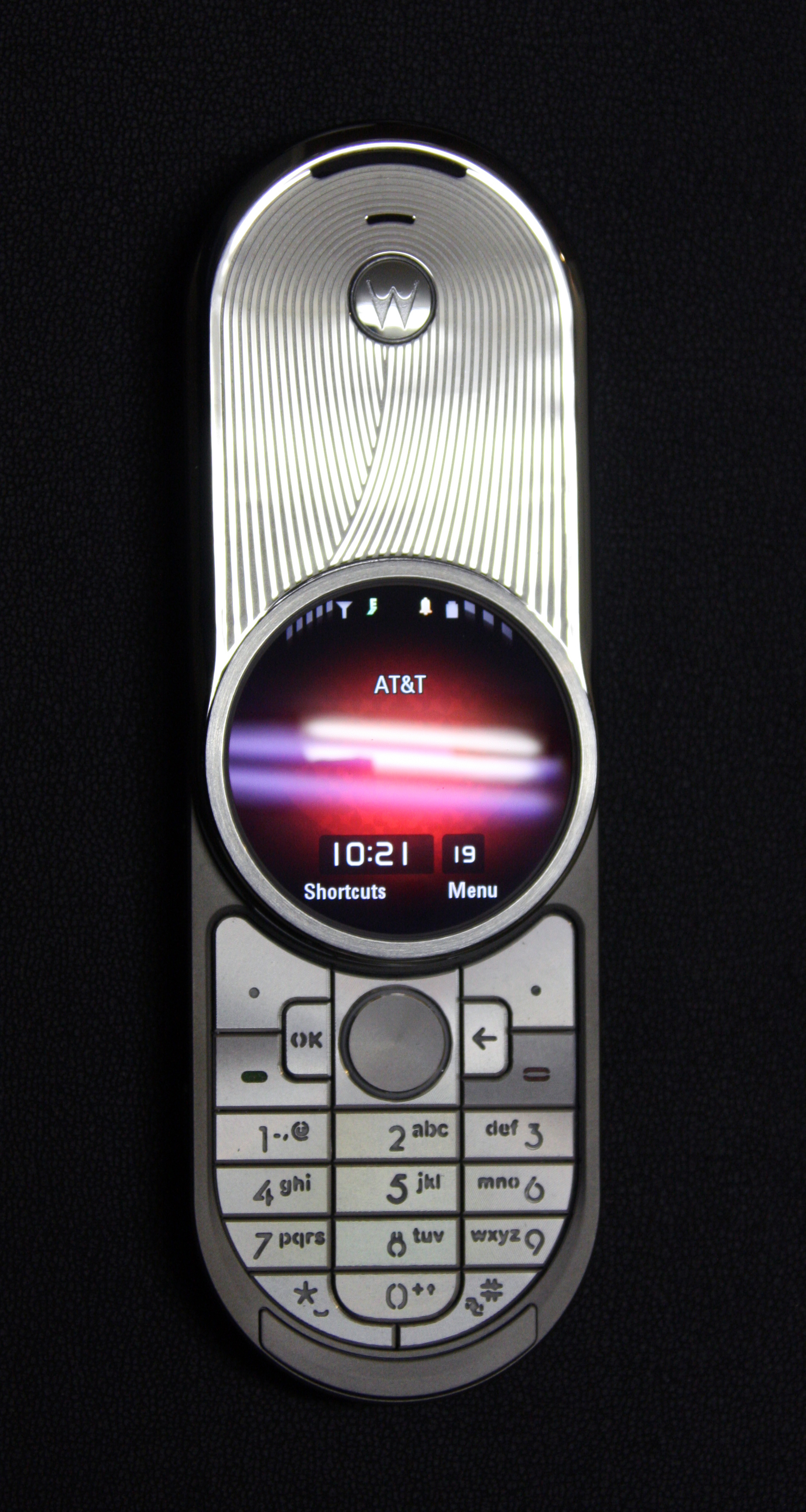
- Manufacturer: Motorola
- Availability by region: December 2008
- Related: Motorola V70
- Compatible networks: 2G only, GSM 850 / 900 / 1800 / 1900
- Form factor: Swivel
- Dimensions: 96.9×47.6×18.6 mm (3.81×1.87×0.73 in)
- Weight: 141 g (5 oz)
- Memory: 2 GB internal memory, no Memory card slot
- Battery: Li-Ion 810 mAh, Talk time capacity: Up to 7 h 20 min.
- Rear camera: 2 megapixel camera (1600×1200 pixels) with video
- Display: Circular TFT screen, 16 million colors, 480px in diameter
- Connectivity: Bluetooth 2.0, USB
- Other: Stainless steel housing, Assisted opening blade mechanism with Carbon-carbide coated gears, voice memo, chemically engraved textures.

Motorola Aura (model no. R1), also marketed as MOTOAURA, is a luxury mobile phone introduced by Motorola in October 2008 for the GSM network. The Aura R1 was launched with a price of approximately US$2,000. It features a 2 megapixel camera, 2GB of internal memory, and a user interface optimized for its circular display, which is a 1.55" screen with a resolution of 300 DPI.

== Marketing ==
Motorola’s advertising focused on the device's design, which included a circular display and 300° swivel, stainless steel body, and sapphire camera lens. It also came packaged in a wooden box upon purchase.

== Variations ==
After the initial model, in 2009, two additional editions of the Aura were announced at the Mobile World Congress: the Diamond Edition and the Gold Edition. Both editions were designed by Alexander Amosu. The Diamond Edition featured 90 diamonds set around the circular display, while the Gold Edition had a 24-carat gold--plated housing. Both editions were produced in limited quantities. In October 2009, the Aura Diamond Edition was released. This version featured an 18-carat gold plating, and 34 diamonds set around its screen and navigation buttons. Its launch price was US$5,730 (£3,500, €3,800). Both the Diamond and Celestial editions were showcased at the annual Mobile World Congress in 2010.

In July 2009, another edition was released to commemorate the 40th anniversary of the Apollo 11 Moon landing. The first unit was gifted to Neil Armstrong.

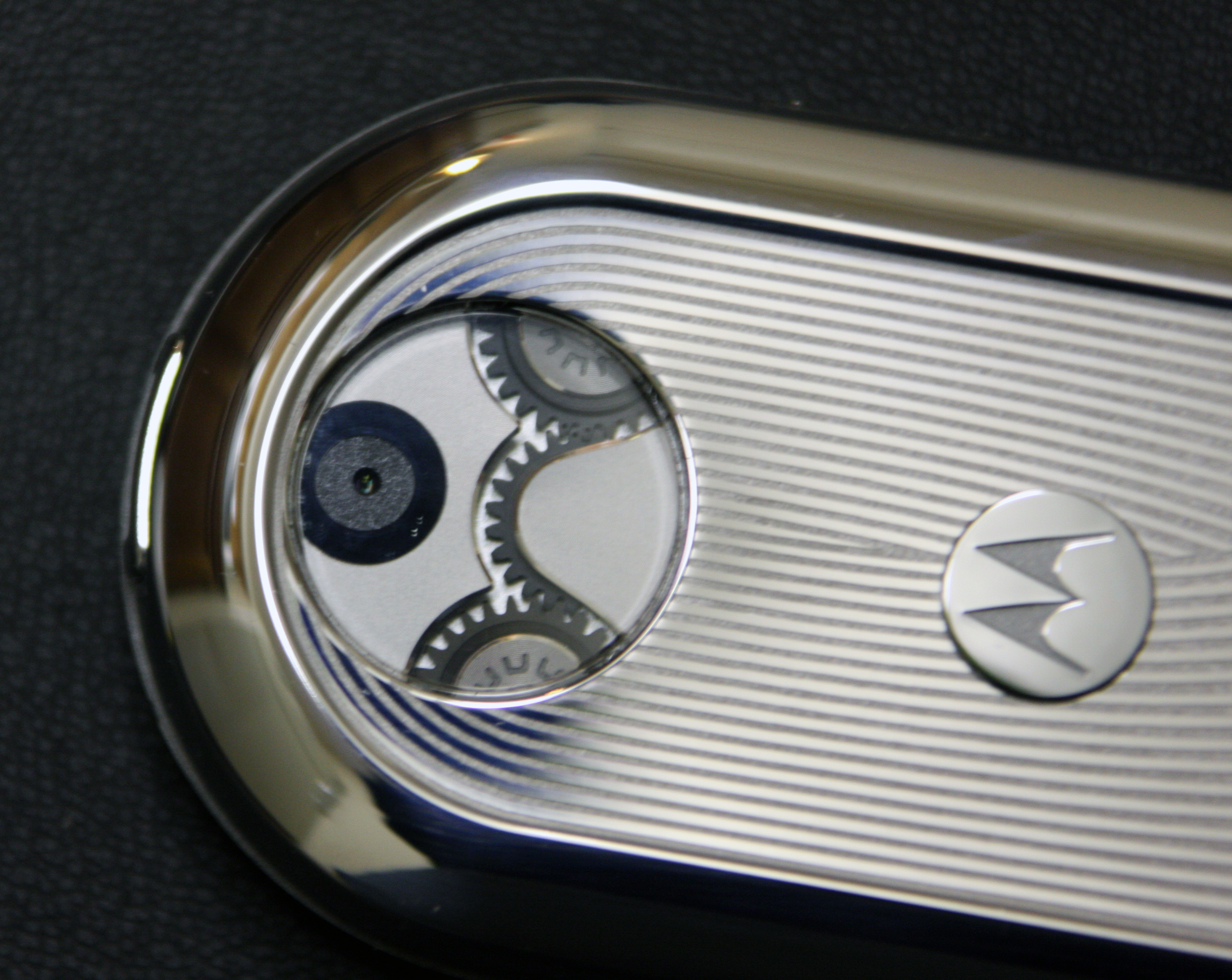
A close-up of the swivel mechanism gears is visible through the clear back window.

== See also ==
- Motorola V70
