= Stop Procrastinating =

Internet filtering software

Stop Procrastinating is an internet and website blocking computer software that restricts access to the Internet or specific websites for a set amount of time to avoid or limit online distraction. It has become a popular tool for students, writers, home workers and self-employed entrepreneurs as well for parents to help control and limited their children's internet use. It is also used extensively by men trying to break their addiction to pornography.

The software has become a notable and popular tool with students as a way to block internet distraction while studying. It has been covered extensively by national university publications and undergraduate student publications. It has been reviewed by College News, the most visited student online news and review website in the US and was recommended as being "the best internet blocker on the market." Influential college publications at the leading US universities of Georgia, Iowa, and Arizona have confirmed the software's popular appeal and how it has become an essential tool for students to study undistracted by the internet, citing downloads of more than 12,000 in just a few weeks.

Stop Procrastinating is also recognised for its influential and extensive independent research about the impact of the internet. A recent influential study undertaken with thousands of parents became international headline news as it was shown that parents face a dilemma as parents felt that they couldn't prevent their children from using the internet, despite evidence that it affects their concentration, because they needed it to study. The issue was a concern for both parents and educational authorities as the move to Internet-based learning was seen to encourage greater internet use by children. The issue was covered in-depth and as headline news by Judith Burns, an expert educational correspondent at the BBC, one of the world's most reputable news outlets.

Its extensive research into how the internet significantly lowers the productivity of employees at work was covered by national newspaper outlets across the world, including in the UK, the Daily Telegraph and in Spain by El Pais, the most read newspaper in Spanish.

== Features ==
The software allows users to set a time from 1 minute to 24 hours and then choose one of three options to block the internet for the time period they have selected. One option allows users to block the internet connection completely but reconnect to the internet by restarting the computer before the time is completed, while a second option prevents users getting back online until the time is up, even if they restart. The software offers a third option called a blacklist, where users can list websites they wish to block, thus still having access to the internet connection, except for the websites they have listed. It was set up by a group of freelance writers and programmers who claim they needed to develop a tool to help cut online distraction. The application is described as helping students, writers, self-employed workers, businesses, office workers, and teenagers who want to block the internet in order to complete their homework, and as a parental control.

Stop Procrastinating was originally called Webtrate, but changed its name to Stop Procrastinating in November 2014.

== Platforms ==
The software was designed to be used on Windows and Apple Mac computers.
