= Samsung SGH-F210 =

Mobile phone model

- Manufacturer: Samsung Electronics
- First released: November 2007; 18 years ago
- Compatible networks: GSM
- Form factor: Swivel
- Dimensions: 87.8×31×20.5 mm (3.46×1.22×0.81 in)
- Weight: 72 g
- Memory: 1GB
- Removable storage: MicroSD
- Rear camera: 2.0 megapixel
- Display: 128 x 220 Pixels 262.144 colours TFT screen
- Connectivity: Bluetooth 2.0 + EDR (A2DP/AVRCP), WAP 2.0, USB 2.0

The Samsung SGH-F210 is a cellphone manufactured by Samsung Electronics.

== Response ==
Trusted Reviews rated it 7/10, criticising the small screen size., The Register gave it 73% expressing confusion about whether it was a phone or an MP3 player, and Pocket Lint gave it 3.5/5.
