= Shutdown Day =

Former idea for holiday

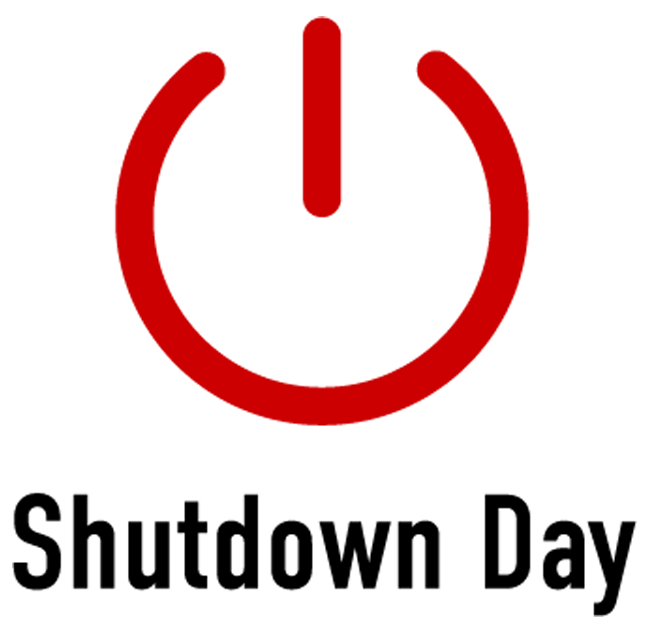
Logo

Shutdown Day was an Internet campaign active between 2007 and 2009 which promoted the idea of a holiday when people would go without a computer for the entire day. The benefits attributed to not using a computer for 24 hours range from electricity savings to getting back in touch with friends and nature.

== Establishment ==
=== Founders ===
Denis Bystrov and Nikolay Kudrevatykh were the co-founders of Shutdown Day; Bystrov originally conceived the idea of Shutdown Day, and the co-founders developed the concept in 2007, while living in Canada. Michael Taylor, an original partner in the idea of shutting down one's computer down for a day, said:

I certainly could not and would not want to live without my computer. However, I am often drawn into spending hours chatting on MSN, simply because my friends are online instead of socialising face to face. I am often too busy to cook a proper dinner, because I want to see the latest news on digg.com or the latest YouTube video. I know parents who are so addicted to the computer that they spend little time with their children, and I also know children who do not spend time with their parents because they are always using the computer. We are not preaching to anyone to turn off their computers. We are just suggesting that people might like to take part in this experiment, and see what happens. Many thanks to our friend Andrei Dryzgalovich who designed, developed and technically supported our project.

== Purpose and goals ==
Shutdown Day is a global Internet experiment whose purpose is to get people to think about how their lives have changed with the increasing use of the home computer, and whether or not any good things are being lost because of this. The concept of the Shutdown Day project is to simply shutdown one's computer for one whole day each year, and become involved in other activities: outdoors, nature, sports, fun stuff with friends and family, just to remind yourself that there is a real world beyond the computer screen.

== History ==
Shutdown Day started in early 2007, when Denis Bystrov realized that he spent too much time with his computer and wanted to spend more time with his family. Bystrov teamed up with his friends Nikolay Kudrevatykh, Michael Taylor (former trade floor occupant in stock markets in London, England) and David Bridle (part-time film maker from Cardiff, Wales), to present a challenge on the Internet, through the website shutdownday.org, challenging people to avoid their computers for 24 hours. The idea was simple:

Do you think you can stay away from your computers for at least 24 hours a day, and if yes, can you pledge to do so?

What began as an innocent question, gathered an Internet chain reaction following, which drew millions of viewers from across the world. Here is a summary of the results from the Shutdown Day 2007 campaign:

- The Shutdown Day website received more than 1.6 million visitors in the first month of the campaign.
- More than 65,000 people participated in the campaign by actually shutting down their computers for 24 hours on 24 March 2007.
- The Shutdown Day promotional clip was broadcast on YouTube and received more than 1.1 million hits.
- 450,000 visitors signed up for country locater on Shutdown Day website.
- The idea of Shutdown Day featured on more than 200,000 online forums discussions, television interviews, and popular media. Services that covered Shutdown Day included Globe and Mail, CNN, Fox News, and TV5.

Later in 2007, as Bystrov was discussing the future of Shutdown Day with another friend, Ashutosh Rajekar, also a victim of excessive technology use, he realized that both had some interesting ideas to share regarding the future direction of Shutdown Day. Eventually, Denis, Nikolay and Ashutosh decided to team up to register as a non-profit organization in the province of Quebec.

In 2008, Shutdown Day was held on May 3. The message to turn off computers and engage in a day without technology was carried by Reuters wire services two days prior to the second annual event. Rajekar's message was now indicating that computers, televisions, and technology in general was having a negative effect on society. Shortly prior to the event, Reuters carried a story encouraging users to step away from their technology for 24 hours. The estimated that the inaugural 2007 event had garnered over 50,000 participants. Many of the group had plans to visit parks, engage in cleaning up public areas, enjoy hiking, camping, and outdoor photography.

=== 2009 ===
Shutdown day 2009 was held on May 2. The campaign started on March 1 and lasted through May 2, 2009. IT Wire reported that media organizations such as Fox News, CNN, The Toronto Sun, The Washington Post were now carrying stories about Shutdown Day. CNET reported that by April 23, almost 55,000 people had agreed to turn off their computers for 24 hours by going to shutdownday.org and clicking on the "yes, I can do it" link.

== See also ==
- Sabbath
