= Feature phone =

Basic type of mobile phone

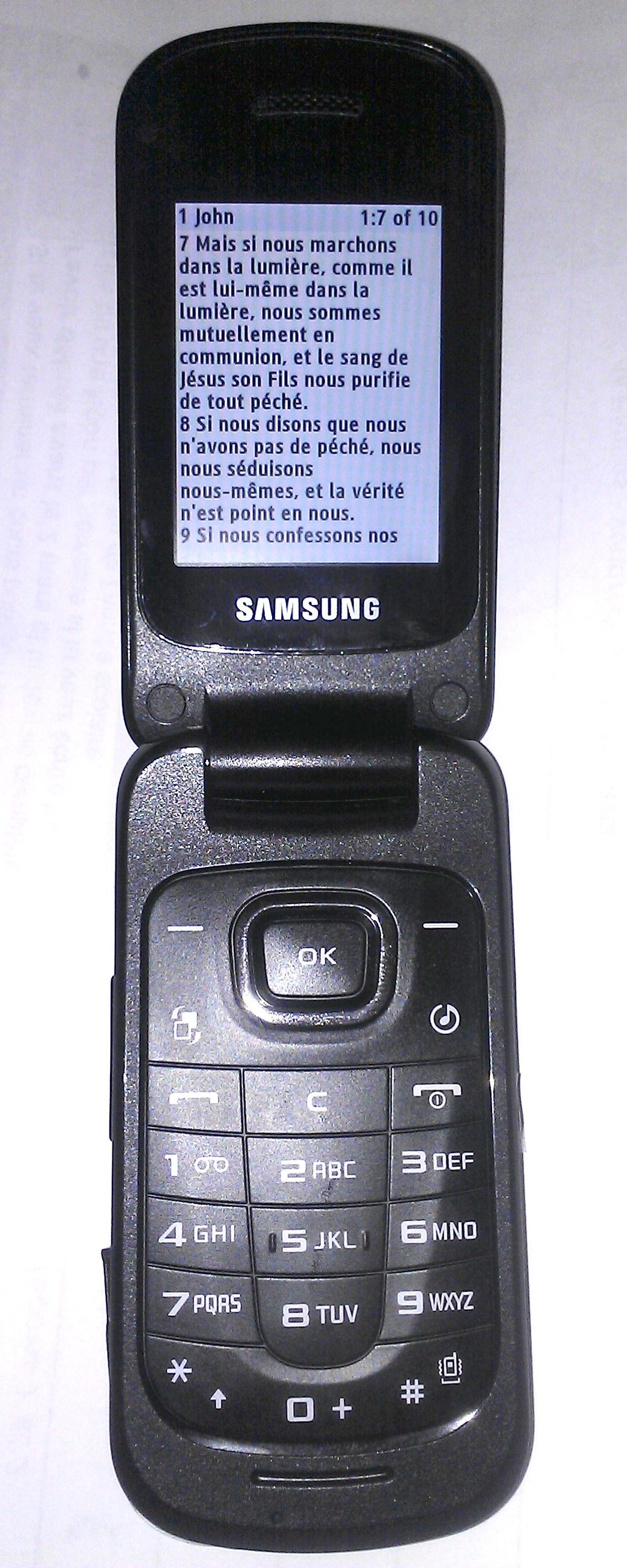
The Samsung C414 feature phone, an advanced feature phone released in 2011

A feature phone, (Note: Also spelled featurephone) brick phone, basic phone, minimalist phone, or dumbphone, is a type of mobile phone with basic functionalities, as opposed to more advanced and modern smartphones. The terms have been used for both newly made mobile phones that are not classed as smartphones and older mobile phones from eras before smartphones became ubiquitous.

The functions of feature phones are limited compared to smartphones: they tend to use an embedded operating system with a small and simple graphical user interface (unlike large and complex mobile operating systems on a smartphone) and cover general communication basics, such as calling and texting by SMS, although some may include limited smartphone-like features as well. Additionally, they may also evoke the form factor of earlier generations of mobile phones, typically from the 1990s and 2000s, with press-button based inputs and a small non-touch display.

Since the growing use of smartphones and concerns about its addiction, there has been a growing movement of users opting for feature phones as part of a digital detox. This is because feature phones have either limited or no access to apps and social media.

== Definition ==
Prior to the popularity of smartphones, the term 'feature phone' was often used on high-end mobile telephones with assorted functions for retail customers, developed at the advent of 3G networks, which allowed sufficient bandwidth for these capabilities.

Depending on extent of functionality, feature phones may have many of the capabilities of a smartphone, within certain cases. The hardware of feature phones often includes a backlit liquid-crystal display (LCD) screen, a hardware notification LED, a micro USB port, a physical keyboard, a microphone, a microSD card slot, a rear-facing camera to record video and capture pictures, and GPS services. Some feature phones include a rudimentary app store that includes basic mobile apps such as a calendar, calculator, mobile web, and mobile games.

Following the rise of smartphones, the feature phone has sometimes been referred to as a dumbphone.

The first GSM phones and many feature phones had NOR flash memory, from which processor instructions could be executed directly in an execute in place architecture and allowed for short boot times. With smartphones, NAND flash memory was adopted as it has larger storage capacities and lower costs, but causes longer boot times because instructions cannot be executed from it directly, and must be copied to RAM first before execution.

== Contemporary usage ==
FocusPhone, an example of a modern basic phone designed using existing smartphone chassis

In developed economies, feature phones are primarily specific to niche markets, or have become merely a preference; owing to certain feature combinations not available in other devices, such as their affordability, durability, and simplicity.

A well-specified feature phone can be used in industrial environments, and the outdoors, at workplaces that proscribe dedicated cameras, and as an emergency telephone. Several models are equipped with hardware functions; such as FM radio and flashlight, that prevent the device from becoming useless in the event of a major disaster, or entirely obsolete, if and when 2G network infrastructure is shut down. Other feature phones are specifically designed for the elderly, and yet others for religious purposes. In Pakistan and other South Asian countries, many mobile phone outlets use feature phones for balance transfer, referred to as Easyload.

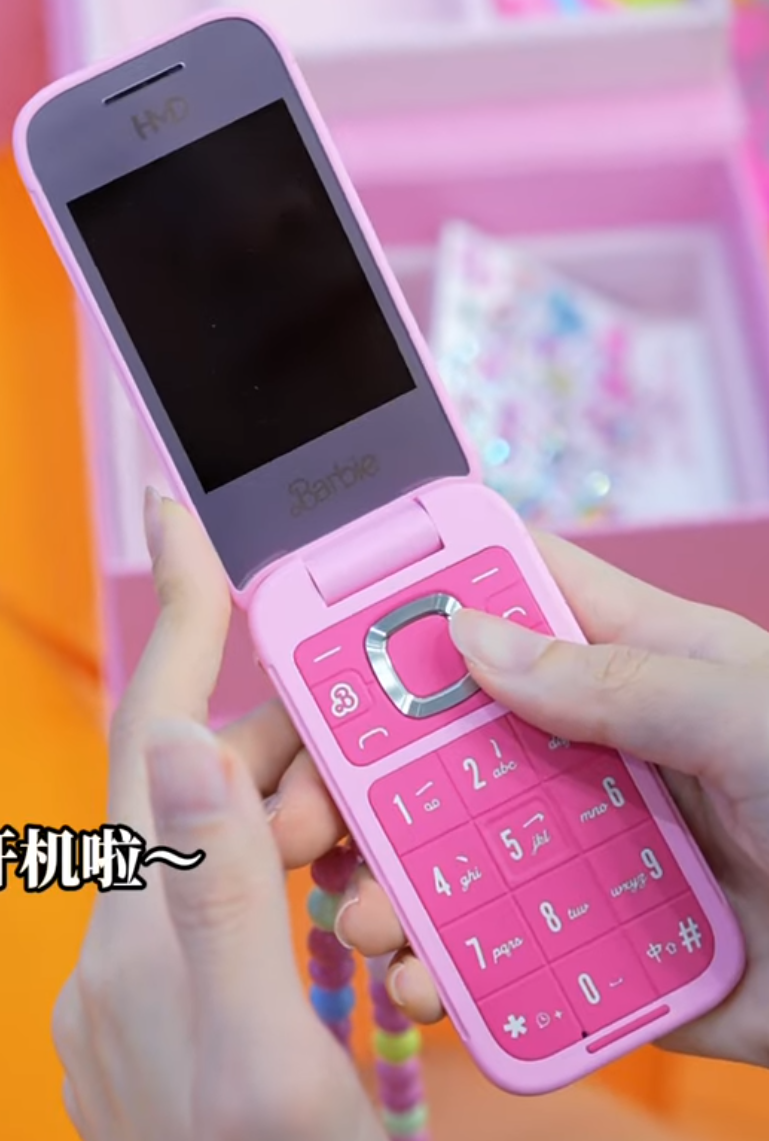
Recent feature phones in the 2020s such as this officially licensed HMD Barbie have been marketed specially against smartphone addiction.

In the late 2010s and early 2020s, multiple new companies were formed specifically to manufacture and sell such phones in North America and Europe. These companies reported accelerated growth in 2023 and early 2024, driven by those who find contemporary smartphones too addictive, including parents worried about their children developing such addictions.

== History ==
=== Industry trends ===
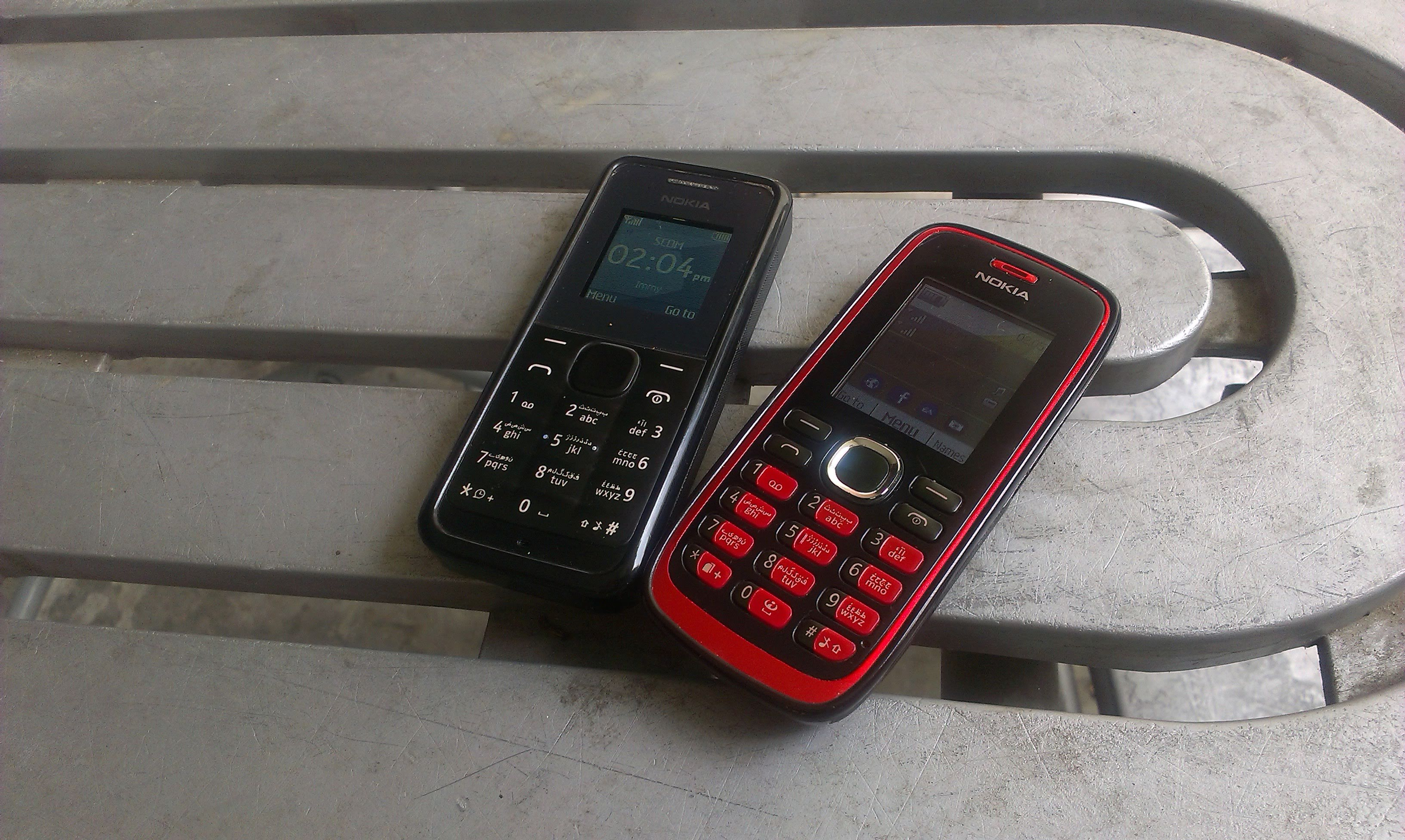
Nokia feature phones

In developed economies in the mid-2000s to the early 2010s, fashion and brand loyalty drove sales, as markets had matured and people moved to their second and third phones. In the United States, technological innovation with regard to expanded functionality was a secondary consideration, as phone designs there centred on miniaturisation. Some phones launched with a transparent screen or keyboard such as the Sony Ericsson Xperia Pureness and the LG Crystal.

Existing feature phone operating systems at the time were not designed to handle additional tasks beyond communication and basic functions, and due to the complex bureaucracy and other factors, they never developed a thriving software ecosystem.

By contrast, iPhone OS (renamed iOS in 2010) and Android were designed as a robust operating system, embracing third-party software, and having capabilities such as multitasking and graphics capabilities in order to meet future consumer demands. These platforms also eclipsed the popularity of smartphone platforms historically aimed towards enterprise markets, such as BlackBerry.

There has been an industry shift from feature phones (including low-end smartphones), which rely mainly on volume sales, to high-end flagship smartphones, which also enjoy higher margins, thus manufacturers find high-end smartphones much more lucrative than feature phones.

The shift away from feature phones has forced mobile network operators to increase subsidies of handsets, and the high selling-prices of flagship smartphones have had a negative effect on the mobile network operators, who have seen their earnings before interest, taxes, depreciation, and amortisation (EBITDA) margins drop as they sold more smartphones and fewer feature phones. To help make up for this, carriers typically use high-end devices to upsell customers onto higher-priced service plans with increased data allotments. Trends have shown that consumers are willing to pay more for smartphones that include newer features and technology, and that smartphones were considered to be more relevant in present-day popular culture than feature phones.

=== Market share ===
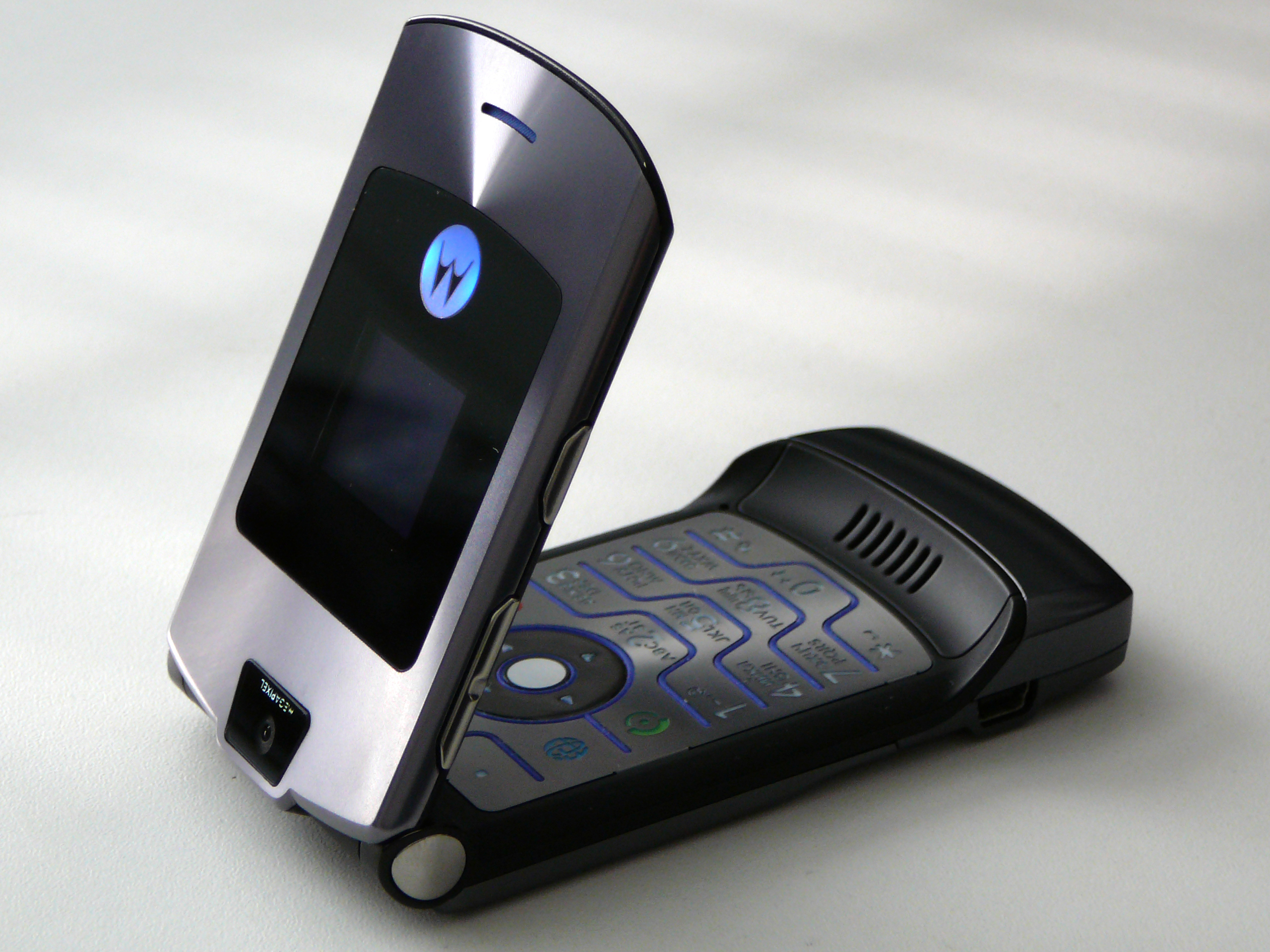
Motorola Razr V3i released in 2005

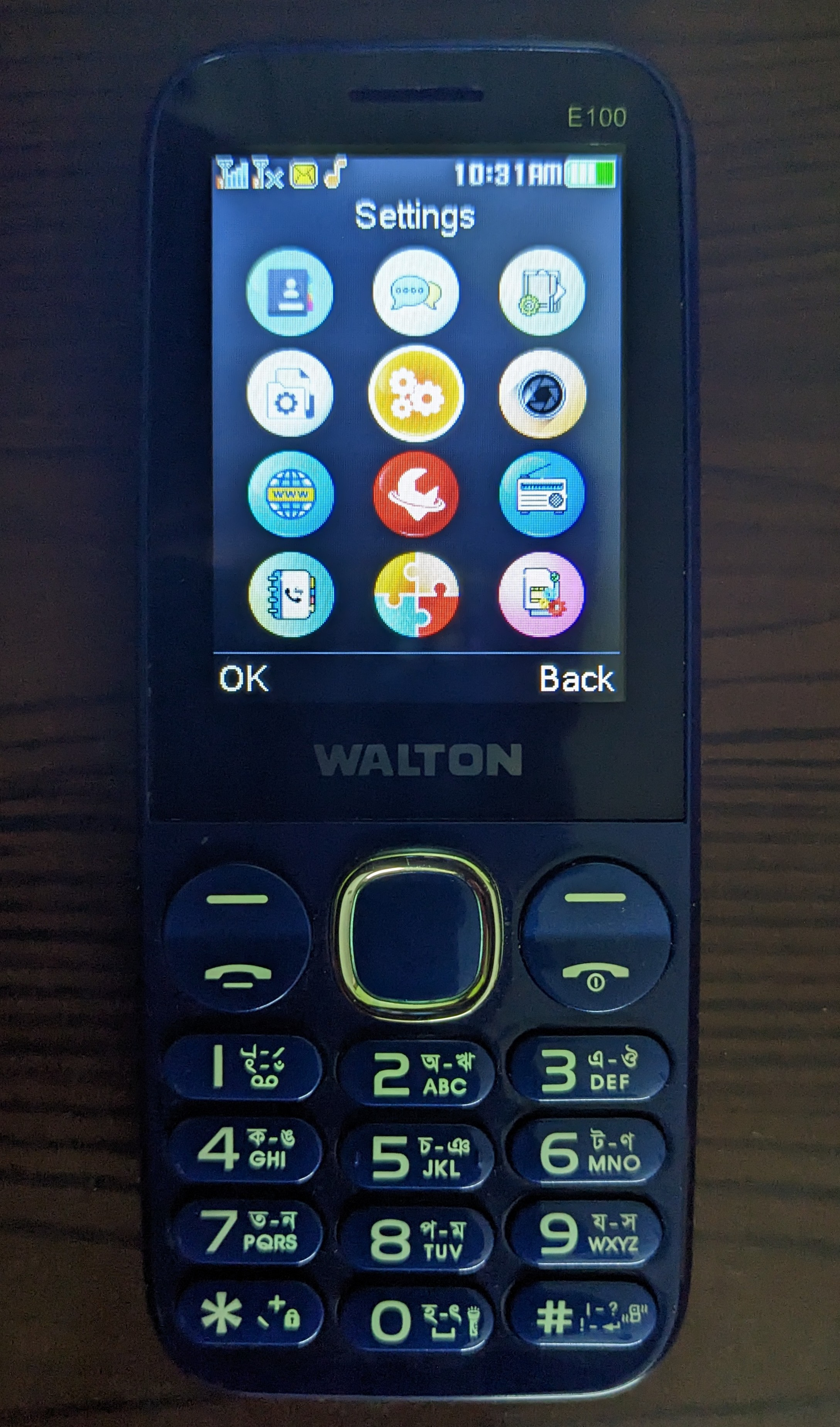
A Walton Olvio E100 feature phone

During the mid-2000s, best-selling feature phones such as the fashionable flip-phone Motorola Razr V3, multimedia Sony Ericsson W580i, and the LG Black Label Series not only occupied the mid-range pricing in a wireless provider's range, they made up the bulk of retail sales as smartphones from BlackBerry and Palm were still considered a niche category for business use. Even as late as 2009, smartphone penetration in North America was low.

In 2011, feature phones accounted for 60 percent of the mobile telephones in the United States, and 70 percent of mobile phones sold worldwide. According to Gartner in Q2 2013, 225 million smartphones were sold worldwide which represented a 46.5 percent gain over the same period in 2012, while 210 million feature phones were sold, which was a decrease of 21 percent year over year, the first time that smartphones have outsold feature phones. Smartphones accounted for 51.8 percent of mobile phone sales in the second quarter of 2013, resulting in smartphone sales surpassing feature phone sales for the first time.

A survey of 4,001 Canadians by Media Technology Monitor (MTM) in late 2012 suggested about 83 percent of the anglophone population owned a cellphone, up from 80 percent in 2011 and 74 percent in 2010. About two thirds of the mobile phone owners polled said they had a smartphone, and the other third had feature phones or non-smartphones. According to MTM, non-smartphone users are more likely to be female, older, have a lower income, live in a small community, and have less education. The survey found that smartphone owners tend to be male, younger, live in a high-income household with children in the home, and residents of a community of one million or more people. Students also ranked high among smartphone owners.

=== Japan ===
Mobile phones in Japan diverged from those used elsewhere, with carriers and devices often implementing advanced features – such as NTT DoCoMo's i-mode platform for mobile internet in 1999, mobile payments, mobile television, and near field communications – that were not yet widely used, or even adopted, outside of Japan. This divergence has been cited as an example of Galápagos syndrome; as a result, these feature phones are retroactively referred to as a 'gala-phone' (ガラケー, gara-kei), blending with 'mobile phone' (携帯, keitai). Throughout the 2010s, gala-phones continued to see usage, with users citing preferences for the devices and their durability over smartphones. However, according to a study by the NTT Docomo Mobile Society Research Institute, as of April 2025, the majority (98.0%) of mobile phone users in Japan now own smartphones, with the most common reason for the switch being described as battery aging.

Mobile games oriented towards smartphones have seen significant growth and revenue in Japan, even though there were three times fewer smartphone users in the country than in the United States as of 2017.

=== Modern minimalist ===
During the era of phones with advanced features, a new type of featurephone has popped up that purposefully strips many capabilities through both hardware and software ways. Such devices have been a relevant subcategory during the 2020s.

==== Examples ====
- FocusPhone (based on Xiaomi Redmi A5 hardware)
- Gabb Phone 4 and Gabb Phone 4 Pro (based on Nuu X6 Plus and Samsung Galaxy A15 hardware, respectively)
- Heineken Boring Phone (based on Nokia 2660 Flip hardware)
- John's Phone
- Light phones:
  - Light Phone
  - Light Phone II
  - Light Phone III
  - Light Flip
- Minimal Phone
- Mudita Kompakt
- Punkt MP02
- Sidephone
- Wisephone I and Wisephone II (based on Motorola Moto E and Samsung Galaxy A hardware, respectively)

== Platforms ==
Java ME was a popular software platform for feature phones in the 2000s, with 3 billion devices supporting it as of 2013. Other platforms which saw significant adoption at this time include Qualcomm's Binary Runtime Environment for Wireless, abbreviated as BREW, and Adobe's Flash Lite. Qualcomm has developed chips such as the Snapdragon 205, QSC6270 and the MSM7500. Qualcomm developed REX OS.

MediaTek developed chips (systems-on-chips (SOCs) or baseband(BB) chips) that powered feature phones, such as the MT6225, other chips in the MT62xx series such as the MT6252, MT6235, reference designs allowing manufacturers to quickly design circuit boards for their feature phones, and an embedded operating system named MAUI Runtime Environment (MRE) which is based on Nucleus RTOS, complete with an SDK for app development. Mythoad was another app format in MediaTek-powered feature phones. These chips are also sometimes used in smartwatches. Additionally, many phones could access the internet using Wireless Application Protocol.

KaiOS can be used as an operating system for feature phones that supports certain apps written using HTML5. Feature Phones can use iMelody or MIDI for storing ringtones Some phones had a feature to create custom ringtones with the number pad.

Android, an operating system that mainly uses for smartphones can be used as an operating system for feature phones with keypad or touchscreen, such as Samsung Galaxy Folder, Light Phone III, Mudita Kompakt, Itel IT9320 and HMD Terra M.

Spreadtrum also developed chips for feature phones such as the SC6531 family including the SC6531E, the SC6531M, and the SC6531F. After Spreadtrum rebranded to Unisoc they developed the Unisoc T107, T117 and T127. They're also developed an embedded operating system named Mocor OS, as well as an Android-based operating system named Mocordroid. The Nokia Series 30+ based feature phones now make use of these since 2020. In 2023, CloudMosa developed Cloud Phone ("Cloud Apps For Feature Phone") technology, meaning these devices using Mocor OS are capable of accessing YouTube, Shorts, TikTok, Google Sign-in Services and real-time modern web applications.

Infineon developed chips in the PMB series such as the PMB7900. Texas Instruments, Philips, Freescale, Broadcom, ST-Ericsson, STMicroelectronics, Ericsson Mobile Platforms and Agere Systems offered chips such as the OMAP, Nexperia (processor), MXC300, BCM21331, NovaThor, and Nomadik SoCs for feature phones. Nokia developed custom chips for internal use such as the DCT4 series of chips.
