= Mobile-to-mobile convergence =

Term in telecommunications

Mobile-to-mobile convergence (MMC) is a technology that allows a mobile device to automatically switch between a Wi-Fi network and a cellular network without interrupting a voice call or data session. The technology is especially useful in terms of lowering cost, providing wider coverage and provides more raw data.

In an MMC system, a dual-mode handset equipped with a software client can detect available Wi-Fi networks and route voice calls and data through them as the primary connection. If the Wi-Fi signal weakens or is lost, the system automatically switches between the WiFi connection and the cellular network without manual help. This is different from fixed-mobile convergence (FMC), which typically requires a service provider to permit the handoff between WiFi and 4G/5G mobile networks.

== History ==
The mid-2000s saw the first major push to commercialize mobile-to-mobile convergence. DiVitas Networks allowed enterprise users to seamlessly hand off calls between a corporate PBX over Wi-Fi and the public cellular network. Early users noticed an improved voice quality on Wi-Fi but also highlighted flaws such as short battery life, unreliable roaming, and complex setup.

== See also ==
- Fixed-mobile convergence
- Wi-Fi calling
- Voice over IP
- Dual-mode handset
