= Light Phone =

Minimalist mobile phone series

The Light Phone Inc.
- Type: Private
- Industry: Electronics (B2C)
- Founded: September 15, 2014; 12 years ago
- Founder: Joe Hollier; Kaiwei Tang
- Headquarters: Brooklyn, New York
- Key people: Kaiwei Tang (Chief executive officer); Joe Hollower (President); Eileen Bayers (VP of Operations and Finance); Tim Kendall (Investor & Board Member)
- Products: Light Phone; Light Phone II; Light Phone III; Light Flip
- Total assets: US$152,453.00 (2018); US$722,218.00 (2017)
- Number of employees: 12 (2024); 4 (2018)
- Website: thelightphone.com

The Light Phone is a brand of minimalist mobile phones by The Light Phone, Inc., a startup company in Brooklyn, New York. Founded by Joe Hollier and Kaiwei Tang, Light creates technology products advertised as "designed to be used as little as possible". The first Light Phone was released in 2015 as a minimalist "dumb phone" that just made calls.

The Light Phone II launched in 2019, which added texting, alarms, and a few other tools. In 2024, the Light Phone III was released. It had a black-and-white OLED screen, longer battery life, and a physical keypad and scroll wheel. The Light Phone series was conceived as a reaction against problematic smartphone use, with the discussion of apps and services such as email, social media, and web browsers being a key focus of the brand's production and marketing.

== Light Phone ==
The Light Phone (1st generation)

=== Release ===
The Light Phone was announced on May 13, 2015, via Kickstarter, and released in April 2017. During its campaign, the Light Phone raised $415,127 from 3,187 backers, over double the initial goal of $200,000.

=== Features and specifications ===
The Light Phone is only capable of making and receiving phone calls and stores up to 10 speed dial numbers. Upon launch, it came with a prepaid 2G SIM card with 500 minutes of call time, assigned to a separate phone number. The Light Phone comes with no applications aside from basic call functionality. The Light Phone features a small two-tone analog-digital display and a headphone jack to assist with phone calls. Buttons on the phone are made visible by light fixtures inside the phone case.

There used to be a smartphone application allowing for redirection of calls from the user's smartphone to the Light Phone, displaying contact names if any are found. This app is no longer accessible, and the dedicated page was removed from the Light Phone website.

== Light Phone II ==
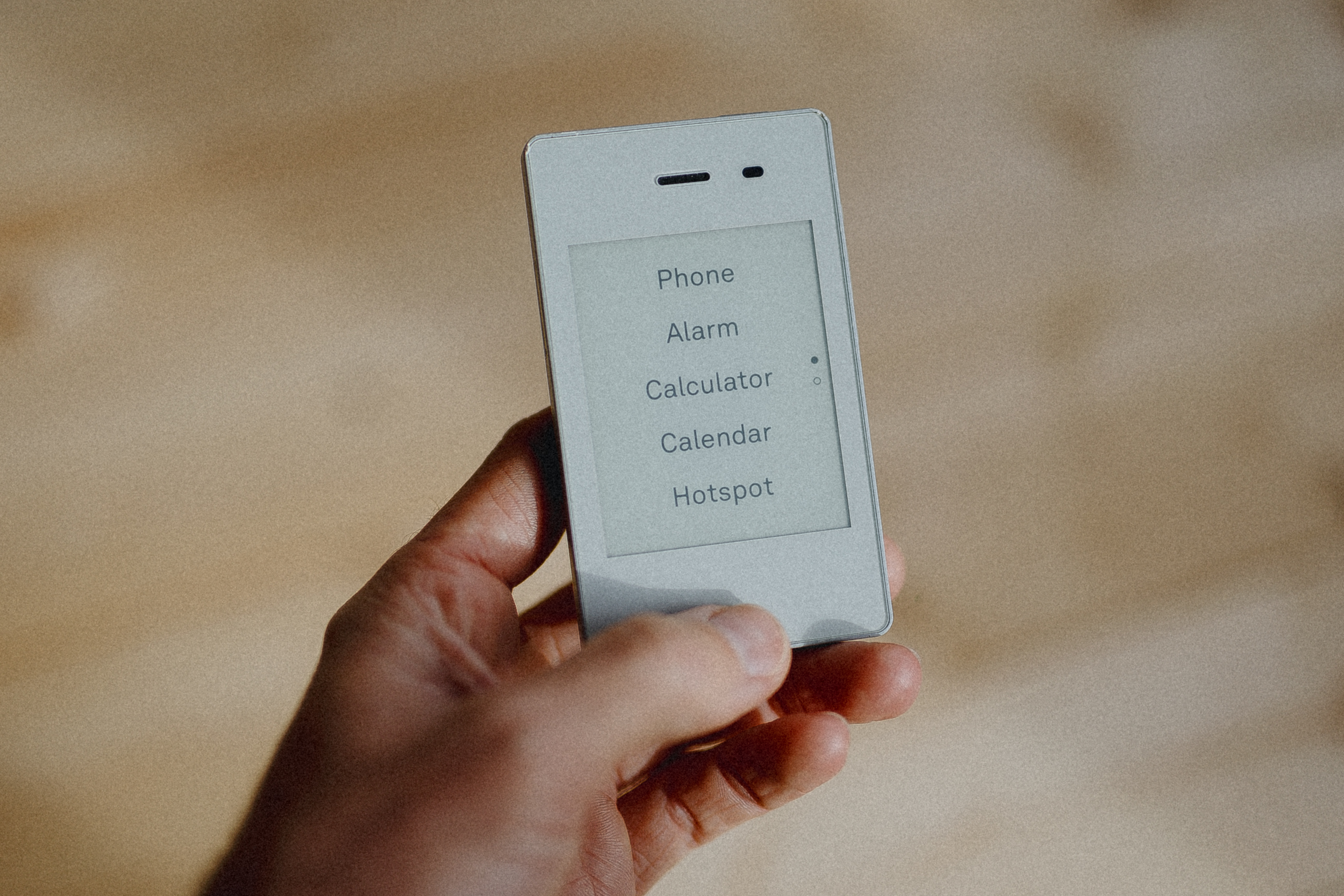
Photo of the Light Phone II (2023)

=== Release ===
The Light Phone II was announced in March 2018. It was designed to be a standalone mobile phone, unlike its predecessor. The project was crowdfunded, raising $3,513,838 by 10,732 backers, and eventually shipped in September 2019.

=== Features and specifications ===
The Light Phone II comes in two colors, light grey and black, and has a 2.84-inch two-color e-ink display. It can connect via Bluetooth, a headphone jack, cellular, or micro USB. It supports 4G, since 2G is no longer widely supported. It can send and receive texts and calls, hold significantly more contacts, set alarms, play music and podcasts, and run a Wi-Fi hotspot. The phone's software is continuously being developed by Light, which has led to new tools such as a calendar, directions, directory, and notes tool. The phone's tools are managed through an online dashboard.

=== pgLang ===
On October 30, 2023, pgLang announced via a short video on their X and Instagram accounts that they had collaborated with The Light Phone to create a limited-edition "pgLang" branded version of the phone. The run of 250 phones was released on pgLang's website November 2, 2023. In addition to the phones new branding, they are also come with a Magic 8-ball-inspired fortune-telling feature which will respond to yes-or-no questions after the phone has been shaken.

== Light Phone III ==
The Light Phone III

The Light Phone III was announced for pre-orders on June 11, 2024 with the first units eventually shipping on March 27, 2025. This is the first time they've announced a new phone without a crowdfunding model. Unlike the previous version of the phone, the Light Phone III has an AMOLED display instead of e-ink. It also has both a front and back facing camera with a dedicated shutter button. The price of the phone is double the cost of the previous model.

== Light Flip ==
The Light Flip is an old-school flip phone combined with features from the Light Phone III. It will be released to the public in April 2027. The 12-button keypad features T9 texting.

== LightOS ==
The Light Phone II & The Light Phone III run an Android-based operating system called LightOS, developed by The Light Phone, Inc. Consumers have found ways to jailbreak it to access Android. In future iterations of LightOS, more features and services are in consideration to be added, including music streaming, WhatsApp, and ridesharing.

LightOS is built on the Android Open Source Project (AOSP) foundation. Specifically, the version running on the Light Phone II was forked from Android 8.1 Oreo, as that was the base OS provided for the phone's Qualcomm MSM8909 chipset (Snapdragon 210). On top of the Android kernel and drivers, they implemented the user interface and native applications using React Native – a JavaScript web framework typically used for cross-platform app development.

LightOS was developed in collaboration with the design agency Sanctuary Computer Inc., which joined Light in early 2018 to create the phone’s software stack. According to its developers, LightOS is the first operating system to embed a React Native application as the core UI launcher. The system is intentionally streamlined and designed to be used "as little as possible", providing only basic tools and eschewing the expansive app ecosystems of standard smartphones.

LightOS aims to offer only essential phone functions in order to reduce distractions and encourage intentional use of technology. The Light Phone II and III running LightOS can perform core tasks like calls and SMS texting, along with a handful of additional features referred to as "tools" rather than apps. The operating system does not support an app store or any third-party apps as of 2025, and it omits services like web browsing, email and social media entirely. The company announced in April 2026 that it would release a software development kit for LightOS in the summer and allow users to create 'Tools' that could be shared with other users after being vetted. Light is also building more Tools itself including one to allow users to use Signal.
