= Digital detox =

Process of not using digital devices

A digital detox is a time without digital devices, such as smartphones.

A digital detox is a deliberate break from digital devices to mitigate screen overuse and promote offline activities. Emerging in response to increasing technology use, the practice addresses concerns about screen addiction's impact on health and mental well-being. Detox approaches range from setting limits on device usage to complete abstinence, sometimes supported by dedicated retreats or travel packages. Though digital detoxes have shown positive effects on focus, relationships, and overall well-being, they may also raise social pressures and fear of missing out (FOMO).

== Background ==
=== Definition ===
A digital detox is a period of time when a person voluntarily refrains from using digital devices such as smartphones, computers, and social media platforms. It encourages awareness of technology use and is aimed at mitigating digital dependency and promoting offline engagement. Subsets of a digital detox include varying levels of decreased electronic use, messaging, social media, and applications.

=== Catalysts ===
Digital detox is predominantly linked with "always-on", pocketable mobile devices, especially ubiquitous smartphones. Several authors have cited the year 2013 as the point where mobile smartphones started to dominate people's lives and led to a wider cultural and psychological shift. The phenomenon of smartphone users in public looking down at their devices has been named dystopian and has gained nicknames such as "smombie" (i.e. smartphone and zombie). The concurrent rise of "selfies" has also been cited in studies as a cause for increased psychological issues to users. On the software side, this also marked the time when social media algorithms began "dictating" emotions.

=== History ===
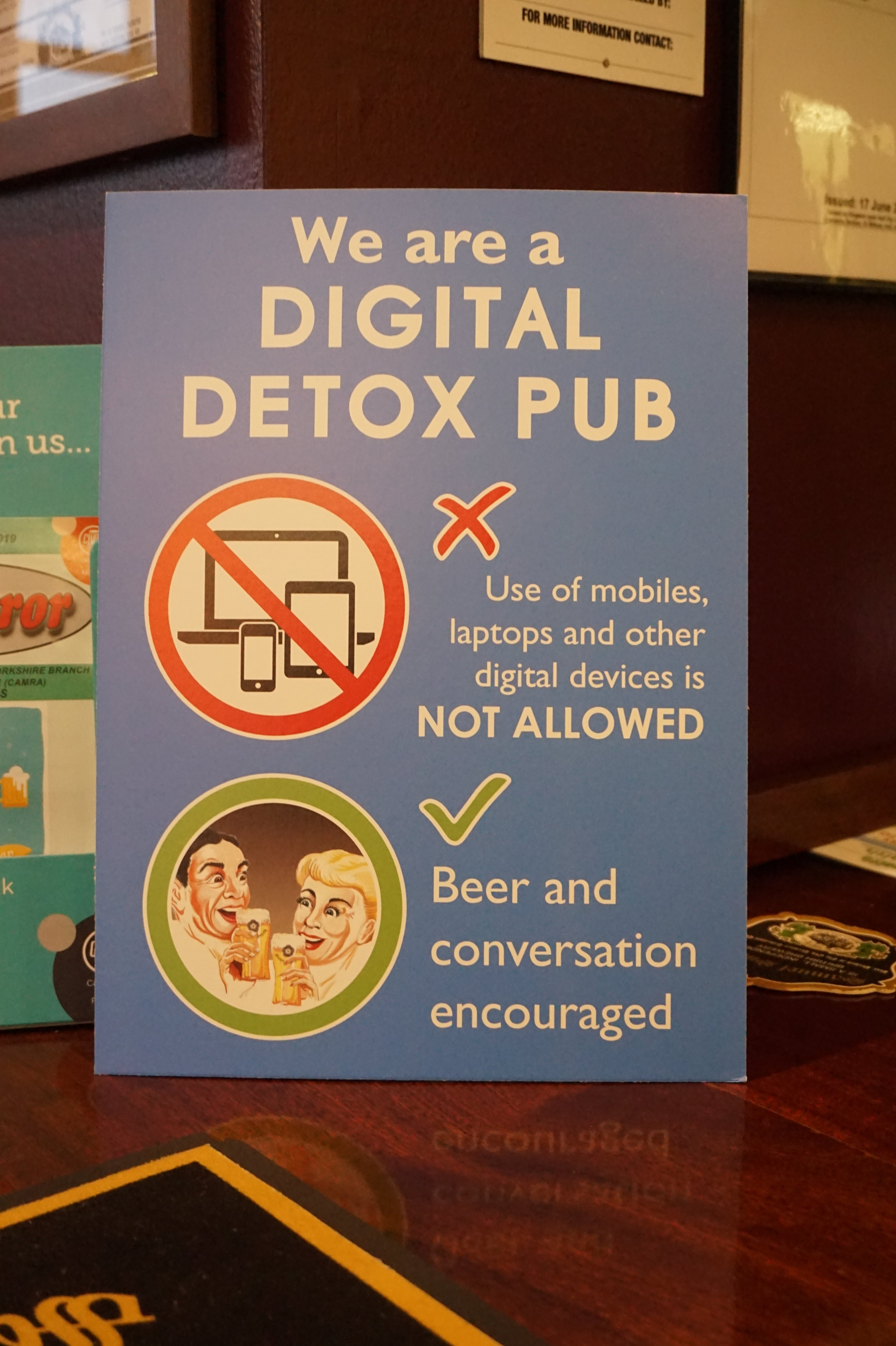
A screen-free pub, explicitly mentioning "digital detox"

Since 2015, discussion and research on the implications of a digital detox have increased. The areas of research can be broken into five main categories: communication, education, tourism, well-being and health, and work environments. The increase in technological advancements has led to a growing demand for research on digital detoxes. The use of video conferencing during COVID-19 has increased the stress-related depletion of physiological resources, leading to negative effects on health.

Celebrities and influencers have promoted the concept of a digital detox. Ed Sheeran and Kendall Jenner have undergone a social media detox and influenced others to do one as well. Comedian Ari Shaffir gained attention for refusing to use a smartphone after concerns about spending too much time on it, especially on social media.

== Motivations ==
A digital detox aims to counteract the negative impacts of excessive screen and technology use, which can lead to both physical and mental health issues.

=== Physical effects ===
Physical effects of technology addiction include illness caused by germs on a phone, eye strain, wrist strain, and neck problems. Neck problems, sometimes called "tech neck", may arise due to leaning the head forward for extended periods to look at a phone. This can lead to chronic pain and deformities such as hunchback. Neck and back pain from excessive phone use can also lead to extreme migraines.

Screen time also has an impact on the brain, especially grey matter and the cerebral cortex. Adults with a diagnosed smartphone addiction have lower gray matter volume and a thinner cerebral cortex compared to those of adults without smartphone addictions. Gray matter is responsible for movement, memory, and emotions. The cerebral cortex is responsible for memory, decision-making, and problem-solving.

Sleep habits are also impacted by smartphone use, as blue light from screens can disrupt sleep patterns through the suppression of the hormone melatonin. This hormone imbalance from diminished melatonin disrupts the REM sleep cycle which is essential for storing memories in the brain.

=== Mental health and behavioral changes ===
Technology reprograms people to feel more anxious when they are not in its presence. Additionally, having a phone close to a person's face can trigger a fight or flight response, setting an anxious tone for the day. Screen time's effect on mental health can also be demonstrated through a positive correlation between depression and screen time. Screen time, specifically in the form of social media, has been found to harm self-esteem.

Screen addiction shares some characteristics with other addictions including alcohol dependence and gambling. Reward-style games, such as some downloadable apps on smartphones, have been found to lead to obsessive behaviors. Additionally, screen addiction can affect children's ability to learn and focus.

== Process ==
The process of a digital detox can vary widely depending on an individual's goals, motivations, and lifestyle. Methods include deleting media platforms, muting notifications, and abstaining entirely from digital media. There are three different variables in a digital detox: time frame, the extent of intervention, and the amount of outside assistance. Generally, digital detoxification can be split into two categories: moderate and complete.

=== Moderate detox ===
A moderate digital detox involves limiting device and social media usage. Common executions in a moderate detox center on setting boundaries. Examples of boundaries include limiting social media usage to specific times of day or implementing screen-free periods, especially in the morning or evening. These boundaries can be supported by software such as Stop Procrastinating, which restricts access to websites or the internet on desktop computers, and AppBlock, which allows users to schedule the blocking of applications and websites on smartphones. One way of curbing the overuse of digital devices is to allocate some of the uses of a smartphone to non-digital means. Another example are devices that only allow selecting essential apps whilst doing without everything else, such "dumbphones". This can alleviate the temptation to check devices continuously throughout the day. Another key element of a moderate detox is controlling the frequency of notifications and alerts. In 2019 Google announced a "paper phone" software which can contain daily agendas, directions, and other uses so that people rely less on their smartphones.

Purpose-made mobile phones such as the Light Phone have been created and released to consumers as a result, while at the same time there had been an increasing interest in older basic phones in the late 2010s. Digital detox movements only accelerated in the 2020s and resulted in ever more purpose-made minimal and basic phones developed and released to consumers. While most of these products have tailor-made hardware, some companies (such as Gabb and Wisephone) have partnerships with large smartphone makers like Samsung to purchase their smartphone hardware, strip the smart software into their own restrictive environments and then market it to consumers.

=== Complete detox ===
A complete detox is an absolute break from digital devices for a set period. This form of detox can be conducted for various periods, the most common ranging between a week and a month. During a complete detox, individuals delete or log out of all social media and messaging apps. Many disable their devices entirely. Some individuals implement this form of detox during a vacation or a period when there are no work or social obligations that would require their online presence. The tourism industry has found a niche market for "digital detox travel packages" where tourists are disconnected from their information and communications technology by traveling to remote areas. A study from University of Nottingham Ningbo China found that the biggest motivators for embarking on a digital detox holiday include mindfulness, technostress, relaxation, and self-expression. Digital detox retreats increase accountability among individuals and prevent the temptation to check devices or engage in habitual online activities.

== Impact ==
=== Relationships ===
Digital detoxes have been found to have a positive impact on relationships from a refocus on offline social interactions. People can build stronger social bonds when they do not check their phones as frequently. Despite this positive impact, studies have found negative effects of digital detoxes on social relationships and interactions. Digital detoxes have also been shown to cause a higher social pressure on participants during social media abstinence compared to pre-intervention social pressure measurements. Furthermore, some research indicates that digital detoxes can result in the fear of missing out (FOMO) on social activities.

=== Health ===
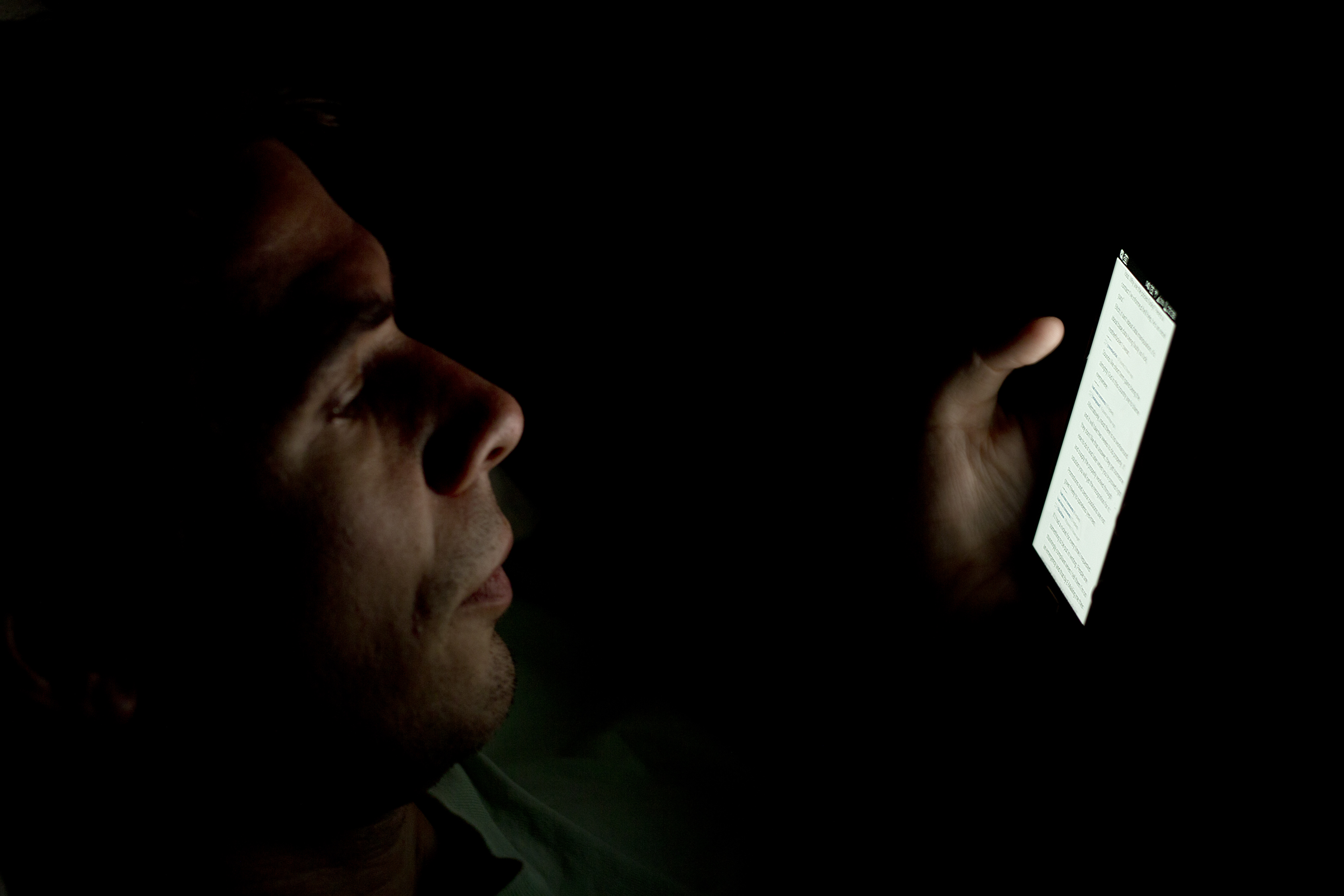
Smartphone usage can disturb sleep and cause vision problems

Digital detoxes have been found to have positive effects on physical health, such as reducing eye strain, dry eyes, and blurry vision. Additionally, a digital detox can address neck pain caused by being in a hunched position from looking at a phone. Furthermore, detoxing has been shown to improve time perception in participants.

One 2023 meta-analysis found that subjective and psychological well-being increased with reduced daily social media use, though it cautioned that the observed effect sizes were small. In contrast, a 2024 meta-analysis found that digital detoxing methods did not significantly affect mental well-being, life satisfaction, and stress levels, but noted that the impact of digital detoxing may depend on individual coping mechanisms, resilience, and the significance of digital interactions in one's life. It also observed that digital detoxing interventions did reduce depression levels. In February 2025, the results of a month-long randomized controlled trial were published in PNAS Nexus which investigated the causal effects of restricting mobile internet access on psychological functioning. The researchers found that restricting such access led to significant improvements in mental health, subjective well-being, and objective measurements of attention span. They concluded that constant connectivity may be detrimental to cognitive performance and emotional health.

In contrast, a 2025 meta-analysis noted that temporary social media abstinence did not significantly affect positive affect, negative affect, or life satisfaction. Another 2025 meta-analysis found that temporary social media abstinence improved subjective well-being, but noted that the observed effect sizes were small.

== Social media detoxification ==
A subset of digital detox is social media detox, which is a period of time when individuals voluntarily stay away from social media. In academic research, social media detoxification is commonly referred to as the "non-use of social media", and falls under the umbrella of digital detox, with a focus specifically on unplugging from social media.

A 2019 Pew Research Center study found that 69% of adults in the United States used Facebook, 73% used YouTube, and 37% used Instagram. A 2012 study found that around 60% of Facebook users have made a conscious effort to voluntarily take a break from Facebook for a time period of several weeks or more. This has been referred to as "media refusal", with non-users known as "social media rejectors" who once used social media but have now voluntarily given it up for various reasons.

== Supporting arguments and technology ==
In the 2010s, technology and social media became an integral aspect of everyday life, and thus the decision to refrain from using technology or social media has become a conscious lifestyle choice reflecting the desire for selective and reversible disconnection. Undoubtedly, in the digital age, social media plays a vital role in building social capital, maintaining connections, and managing impressions. Scholars have argued for the importance of maintaining a certain level of distraction that social media can provide for a balanced state of body and mind, and some scholars have even debated that social media is necessary and should not be completely cut out. That being said, many scholars believe that the moderation of social media is essential, primarily due to social media platforms' goal of encouraging constant use with likes, notifications, and infinite scrolling. Furthermore, to lessen the effects of these addictive features social media platforms such as Instagram have begun to explore alternative methods, such as making likes on a user's post invisible to the user, to shift the focus away from constant notifications and likes.

Some companies have even launched movements against technology addiction. For example, in October 2019, Google and Special Projects (an award-winning design and invention studio based in London) released Paper Phone, a Google product consisting of a printed piece of paper folded into eighths that contains relevant information to your day much like a daily planner. The motive behind the project was to provide the utility of a smartphone in a simplistic and less dynamic delivery. Moreover, other projects have focused on building second phones with less functionality, or putting human nature and design above technology. Some critics disagree with Google's approach to the digital detox phenomenon, however, and instead argue that harmony between technology use and well-being can be achieved. Additionally, these critics suggest that the best way to digitally detox is to be mindful of the amount of time that is being spent on a digital device.

== See also ==
- Delayed gratification
- Digital media use and mental health
- Dopamine fasting
- Internet addiction
- Problematic social media use
- Shutdown Day
- Minimalist mobile phone
