= Samsung Galaxy Folder =

Smartphone

- Manufacturer: Samsung Electronics
- Type: Smartphone
- Series: Samsung Galaxy
- First released: July 2015
- Successor: Samsung Galaxy Folder 2
- Compatible networks: GSM, HSPA, LTE
- Form factor: Flip
- Dimensions: 122×60.2×15.3 mm (4.80×2.37×0.60 in)
- Weight: 155 g (5 oz)
- Operating system: Android 5.1.1 "Lollipop"
- System-on-chip: Samsung Exynos 3475
- CPU: ARM Cortex-A7 1.2 GHz Quad
- GPU: Mali T720 MP1 600 MHz
- Memory: 1.5 GB
- Storage: 8 GB
- Battery: removable 1800 mAh Li-ion battery
- Rear camera: 8 MP
- Front camera: 2 MP
- Display: 3.8 inch WVGA TFT LCD
- Connectivity: Wi-Fi, Bluetooth 4.1, GPS, microUSB 2.0
- Data inputs: T9 keypad, capacitive touchscreen

The Samsung Galaxy Folder is an Android-based smartphone of the Samsung Galaxy series released in July 2015 exclusively to the South Korean market, after its two-year development. The phone is considered unusual for being both a smartphone and a flip phone.

Production discontinued in 2017 to succeed to the Samsung Galaxy Folder 2.

== Specifiations ==
=== Hardware ===
The Galaxy Folder was housed by a Samsung Exynos 3475 chipset with a 1.2GHz quad-core Cortex-A7 and a 600MHz Mali T720 MP1 graphics processor. It was powered by a removable 1800 mAh Li-ion battery.

It has an internal storage of 8 gigabytes and 1.5 gigabytes of RAM. It is also expandable with the microSD card up to 128GB.

=== Software ===
The Galaxy Folder runs on Android Lollipop (5.1.1).
