= Light Phone (1st generation) =

2G minimalist mobile phone

- First-generation Light Phone (2017)
- Developer: Light
- Manufacturer: Light
- Product family: Light Phone
- Type: Mobile phone
- Released: May 2017
- Introductory price: US$150 at launch
- Operating system: LightOS (custom firmware)
- CPU: NXP chipset (proprietary)
- Memory: Unknown
- Storage: ~512 MB
- Display: OLED numeric display (non-touch)
- Input: T9-style keypad, power button, USB button
- Connectivity: 2G GSM
- Power: Non-removable battery (600–800 mAh est.)
- Dimensions: 85.6 mm × 53.98 mm × 4.0 mm (credit card sized)
- Weight: ~38 grams
- Predecessor: None
- Successor: Light Phone II
- Website: Light Phone – Official Site

The Light Phone is a 2G minimalist mobile phone developed by Light. It was introduced in 2015 as an “anti-smartphone,” designed to be “used as little as possible,” with the goal of helping users disconnect from the constant notifications, social media, and apps that characterize modern smartphones.

It can make and receive phone calls, and was designed primarily to function as a companion phone, working through call forwarding from a user's primary device. Unlike later models, the original Light Phone does not support texting, internet access, or third-party applications, and has no camera or GPS capability.

Subsequent versions include the Light Phone II and the Light Phone III.

== Design and features ==
The Light Phone features an ultra-minimalist, credit-card-sized form factor. It has a small white LED display and T9-style keypad. The casing is sleek and white, with no camera, no internet connectivity, and no apps.

Designed as a companion device to a smartphone, it could forward calls via a companion app. Users could insert a SIM card and use the Light Phone independently for calls only, with 500-number contact storage and 3 days of standby battery life.

== Technical specifications ==
- Display: LED matrix (white)
- Network: 2G GSM (850/1900)
- Input: T9 numeric keypad
- Battery life: Up to 3 days standby, 3 hours talk time
- Weight: 38.5 grams
- Storage: Stores up to 500 contacts
- Charging: Micro-USB
- Dimensions: 85.6 mm × 53.98 mm × 4 mm

== Reception ==
Reception to the Light Phone was generally positive among digital minimalists and critics of modern smartphone overuse. MIT Technology Review called it a “genuinely radical” device aimed at helping people reclaim their attention. However, mainstream reviewers noted limitations due to the lack of texting, 4G support, or a usable screen.

== Legacy ==
The Light Phone was followed by two successor devices: the Light Phone II, which added a monochrome E Ink touchscreen and support for texting and additional "tools", and the Light Phone III, which further introduced a monochrome AMOLED screen, camera, and 5G connectivity.

The original Light Phone is now considered a seminal example of the minimalist tech movement, often cited in discussions of digital minimalism and smartphone overuse.

== See also ==
- Light Phone II
- Feature phone
- Smartphone addiction
