= Media Technology Monitor =

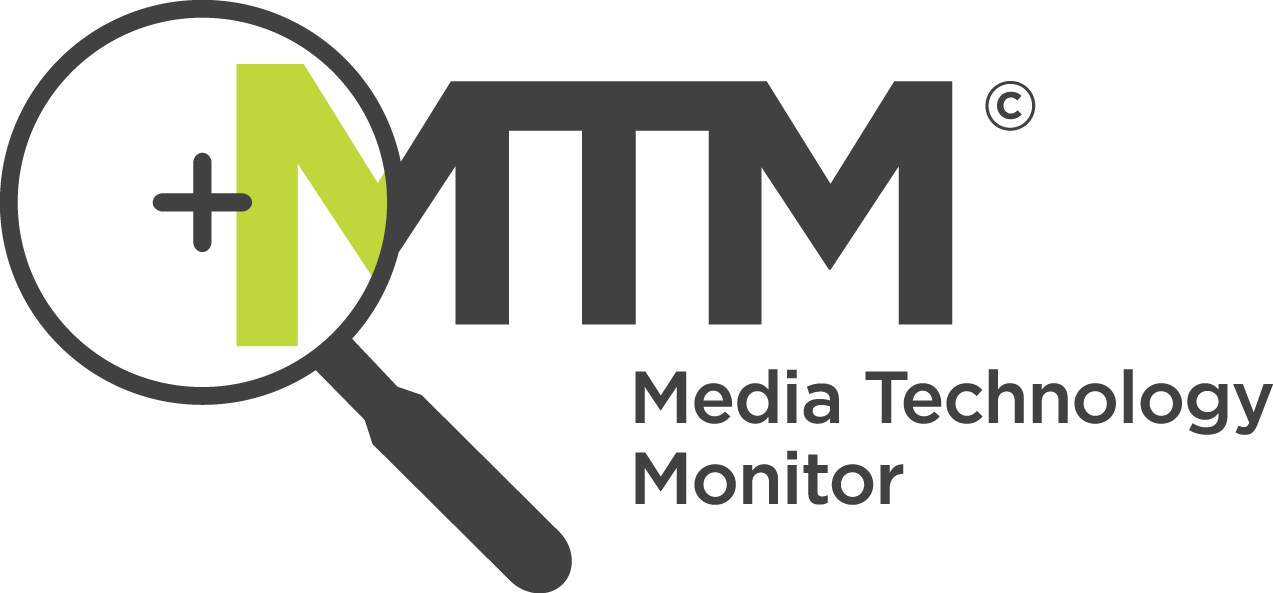
MTM logo

The Media Technology Monitor (MTM) is research product designed to monitor Canadians' use and adoption of new and existing technologies. The first MTM 18+ questionnaire, which focuses on Canadian adults, was distributed in 2005 and now consists of two annual telephone and web surveys conducted once during spring and fall each year. MTM 18+ surveys Canadians from all Provinces and Territories of Canada.

MTM was designed, implemented, and analyzed by the Canadian Broadcasting Corporation (CBC/Radio-Canada). In 2019, MTM started the MTM JR annual survey of Canadians aged 2 to 17. MTM JR focuses on how young Canadians consume and use media. In Spring 2021, MTM introduced a new research product - MTM Newcomers. It focuses on the growing demographic of those who have immigrated to Canada within the past five years.

== History ==
The Media Technology Monitor has evolved from the Canadian Broadcasting Corporation's Quality Ratings Survey (QRS) that began in 1997 to measure Canadians' use and perception of Canada's conventional and specialty television channels as well as some media technology behaviours. In 2005, the MTM was launched with a specific focus on media technology adoption and use among Canadians.

In 2010, an online MTM portal was created to provide a more interactive experience for users. The portal allows users a new way to download MTM reports and trending data, as well as conduct custom analysis of the data with a proprietary Data Analysis Tool and Forecasting Tool.

In 2012, the MTM integrated Cell Phone only (CPO) homes in its sample.

In 2015, the MTM celebrated its 10th anniversary. The portal was updated adding an Interactive Trending Tool and a Forecasting Tool. A follow-up online survey was also added, providing over 1,500 data points to users. Since 2019, MTM JR focuses on the media behaviours and activities of Canadians aged 2-17. This annual survey is based on approximately 1,700 households with 2,500 children, equally split between Anglophones and Francophones. Along with reports and infographics, MTM Junior provides two tools to access data: the Data Analysis Tool (DAT) and the Trending Tool.

In Spring 2021, MTM launched its newest research product - MTM Newcomers. MTM Newcomers is an annual survey that focuses on newcomers in Canada, with 4,000 respondents including newcomers and international students who have come to Canada in the past five years. The surveys are administered in 8 different languages including: Tagalog, Cantonese, Mandarin, Punjabi, Arabic, Spanish, French, English. Along with reports and infographics, MTM Newcomers provides one tool to access data: the Data Analysis Tool (DAT)

== Methodology ==
=== Survey design and sampling ===
The MTM 18+ is released in the fall and spring of each year and collects a total of 12,000 responses through telephone and online surveys with 6,000 Anglophones and 6,000 Francophones aged 18+. The response rate for both surveys is 30%.

- Fall Survey - 8,000 Respondents (4,000 Anglophones and 4,000 Francophones)
- Spring Survey - 4,000 Respondents (2,000 Anglophones and 2,000 Francophones)

MTM survey households are selected by Random Digit Dialing (RDD) and the respondent within each household is randomly selected based on the most recent birthday method. The MTM 18+ uses telephone surveys to ensure that the respondents are representative of all Canadians by eliminating bias due to geographic location and connection to the Internet.

The mixed-methods approach includes landline and cell phone only households (CPO), as well as an online survey component. The telephone survey sample is weighted according to gender, age, region, and language. Questions in the online survey are given an additional weight to reflect the Canadian online population according to its light, medium and heavy Internet usage.

Ad Hoc Research conducts both the English and French language interviews and is also responsible for recruiting both the English and French cell phone only sample.

=== MTM 18+ tools ===
The MTM 18+ provides four tools to access data: reports, the data analysis tool (DAT), the trending tool, and the forecasting tool.

1. Reports.
2. The data analysis tool (DAT): provides access to the national, Anglophone, French and Quebec datasets.
3. The trending tool: enables to see data based on language market and demographic variables.
4. The forecasting tool: provides a source of technology projection.

== Current topics ==
The Media Technology Monitor is revised every year to include emerging media trends and technologies. Recent MTM surveys have asked respondents about their behaviour and consumption of:

- Traditional media (TV, Radio)
- Online Video & Audio
- Internet Usage & Activities
- Devices
- Social Media

== Media coverage and published works ==
=== Books ===
- Digital Radio in Canada: From DAB to Multi-Platform Approaches, Brian O'Neill, Dublin Institute of Technology, 2007
- Broadcasting Policy in Canada, Robert Armstrong, University of Toronto, 2010
- The Political Economies of Media: The Transformation of the Global Media Industries, Dwayne Winseck & Dal Jong Jin, 2011

=== Canadian Radio-television and Telecommunications Commission ===
- Communications Monitoring Report 2016

=== Canadian Heritage ===
- The Canadian Media Production Association (CMPA) in conjugation with the Department of Canadian Heritage
