= List of devices that run MontaVista Linux =

This is an incomplete list of embedded devices that run MontaVista Linux: electronic devices with limited internal computers whose main operating system is based on MontaVista's distribution of the open-source Linux operating system.

== Digital televisions ==
- Philips Aurea and selected ambiLight models
- Sony Bravia models from 2005 and earlier
- selected models from Samsung, Panasonic, Sharp and Mitsubishi

== Digital video recorders and set-top boxes ==
- Sony DHG-HDD250
- Sony DHG-HDD500

== ebook readers ==
- Sony LIBRIé EBR-1000
- Sony PRS-505
- Sony PRS-700
- Sony PRS-300
- Sony PRS-600
- Sony PRS-900

== Voip phones ==
- D-Link DPH-125MS

== Mobile phones ==
- Motorola A760
- Motorola A768
- Motorola A768i
- Motorola A780
- Motorola A910
- Motorola E680
- Motorola E680i
- Motorola MING
- Motorola RAZR2
- Motorola ROKR E2
- Motorola ROKR E6
- Motorola RIZR Z6
- Motorola ZN5
- NEC N900iL
- NEC N901iC
- Panasonic P901i

== Musical instruments ==
- Yamaha MOTIF XS music production synthesiser, Yamaha Motif-Rack XS tone module, and Yamaha S90XS synthesizer.

== Network attached storage ==
- Seagate Central STCG2000100
- Seagate Business Storage STBN8000200
- SMC TigerSTore SMCNAS02
- SMC TigerSTore SMCNAS04

== Notebooks ==
- Dell Latitude E4200
- Dell Latitude E4300
- Dell Latitude E4310
- Dell Latitude Z600

== Routers ==
- D-Link G604T Network Adaptor
- D-Link G624T Router
- D-Link G664T
- D-Link G684T ADSL2+/WiFi
- Linksys WAG200G ADSL2+/WiFi
- ACORP Sprinter@ADSL LAN120M

== Cable modems ==
- all DOCSIS/EuroDOCSIS 3.0 cable modems based on Intel Puma5 chipset

== Traffic signal control ==
- Peek Traffic PTC-1

== Telecommunications equipment ==
- Alcatel-Lucent
- Brocade SAN switches
- Ericsson
- Fujitsu
- Iskratel SI 2000 call server
- Microsemi SyncServer
- Motorola WiMax CPE i775
- NEC
- Cisco Application Control Engine module
- Cisco Nexus switches running NX-OS
- Avaya Aura Session Border Controller (SBC)
- Cyclades ACS

== Digital televisions ==
- Aviosys IP Kamera 9070 series (TI Davinci DM355 board)

== Other ==
- Spirent Testcenter
- Grundfos industrial multi-pump controller
- KMC Fusion building automation platform (KMC Controls)
- Microchip PolarFire SoC FPGA development platform
- APC by Schneider Electric IP KVM - The AP5405 remote Internet Protocol keyboard/video/mouse controller allows 16 servers to be accessed over a TCP/IP network.
- Philips iPronto remote controller
- St. Jude Medical Merlin patient care system
- Texas Instruments announced using MontaVista Linux as the supported operating system for their system on a chip platform, Texas Instruments DaVinci. MVL4 and MVL5 were used for the first and second software development kit series until TI decided for a less commercial approach with the third edition of their software development kit.
- The terminals used for the National Lottery and EuroMillions games in the Republic of Ireland are based on MontaVista Linux and use a Java client, as do most other newer GTECH Corporation Altura terminals.
- SEGA Lindbergh hardware for arcade gaming
- Clarion NX603 multimedia head unit
- Phenom (electron microscope) (first generation - later switched to other distributions)
- British Telecom ITS.Netrix dealerboards
- Canon imageRUNNER Advance C5051i multi-function printer (MFP)
- Sony DVS, MVS & MVS-X Production Switchers
- Hewlett-Packard Designjet large-format printers (z3200 series)
- Pepper Pad + Pepper Pad 2 mobile internet device
