= Motorola 4Ltr =

Series of mobile phones from Motorola

The Motorola 4LTR line refers to series of mobile phones from Motorola which have four-letter names, hence the name "4LTR."

== Series ==
| Image | Name | Type | Introduced | Discontinued | Notes |
|---|---|---|---|---|---|
| AURA | AURA | Swivel | October 2008 | 2010? | |
| DEXT | DEXT | Slider | 2009 | | AKA Cliq in the US |
| FONE | FONE | Candybar | June 2006 | 2009? | |
| KRZR | KRZR | Flip | July 2006 | 2008? | |
| MING | MING | Slate with flip cover | December 2005 | 2011? | Hong Kong and mainland China only |
| PEBL | PEBL | Flip | 2005 | 2009? | |
| No image at the moment | QRTY | Slider | July 2010 | | South Korea only |
| RAZR | RAZR | Flip | 2004 | 2009 | |
| RAZR2 | RAZR^{2} | Flip | 2007 | 2009? | |
| RAZR3 | RAZR^{3} | Flip | 2009 | 2009? | SK Telecom exclusive (South Korea) |
| RIZR | RIZR | Slider and Kick-slider | 2006 | 2009? | |
| ROKR | ROKR | Candybar and Flip | September 2005 | 2010? | Featuring iTunes connectivity |
| SLVR | SLVR | Candybar | 2005 | 2007? | |
| ZINE | ZINE | Candybar | 2008 | 2009? | |
