= ROKR =

ROKR can refer to:

- The Motorola Rokr series of mobile phones, which included:
  - Motorola ROKR E1
  - Motorola ROKR E2
  - Motorola ROKR E6
  - Motorola ROKR E8
  - Motorola ROKR EM30
  - Motorola ROKR Z6
  - Motorola ROKR Z6m
  - Motorola ROKR S9-HD, a Bluetooth headset
- Kerama Airport, Japan - ICAO code
- ROKR, a Chinese toy brand owned by Robotime Technology
