= OpenEZX =

Open-source software

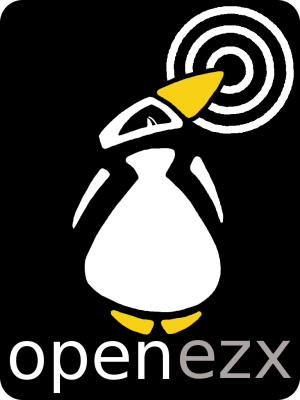
- Website: openezx.org

OpenEZX was a project active from 2004 to 2008, which gathered information about the Linux based Motorola EZX phone platform.

It tried to provide a 100% free software stack for those phones, especially a way to avoid any proprietary filesystem and/or device drivers. It also aimed to provide a current (2.6.x) kernel with all required hardware support for the EZX phones.

Supported phones included:

- Motorola mobile telephones, generally based on MontaVista Linux, include the ROKR E2, ROKR E6, A780, E680, A910, A1200 and others to come.

There is an archive of the historic OpenEZX software git repositories on.

== See also ==
- Replicant (operating system)
- Mobilinux

== See also ==
- Motorola
- List of Motorola products
- List of mobile phones running Linux
