= SCREEN3 =

SCREEN3 was a technology used and designed by Motorola to push news and information to mobile phones, particularly legacy featurephones.

== Functionality ==
SCREEN3 functioned by downloading data and displaying it on the phone while idle. After the user configured which feeds or channels are of interest, feed updates were continuously and automatically pushed to the handset via background data transfer.

While viewing the small images and accompanying headlines ("bites") which scroll by on the screen, users can choose to view a snippet of the actual story ("the snack"). Users then are taken to a condensed summary version of the story or headline. At this point, if the story is deemed sufficiently interesting, users can opt to view the full story ("the meal"), causing the web browser to be launched to retrieve the appropriate web page.

Modern smartphones are capable of similar functionality via push notifications.

== Availability ==
SCREEN3 became available in Motorola products starting with phones shipping near the end of 2005. The technology was not available on all handsets, nor was it supported by all wireless carriers. SCREEN3 required the user to maintain a data plan through their wireless carrier, and also required subscription fees to access certain data feeds.

=== Products advertised as supporting SCREEN3 ===
- Motorola KRZR K1
- Motorola KRZR K3
- Motorola MotoRokr E6
- Motorola PEBL U6
- Motorola RAZR V3
- Motorola RAZR V3i
- Motorola RAZR V3x
- Motorola RAZR V3xx
- Motorola RAZR V6
- Motorola RAZR² V9
- Motorola RIZR Z3
- Motorola SLVR L7
- Motorola V195
- Motorola V360
- Motorola V557
- Motorola SLVR L9

=== Wireless carriers advertised as supporting SCREEN3 ===
- Cingular Wireless
- Telefonica
- China Mobile
- ChungHwa Telecom
- M1 (Singapore) (Discontinued support on 2008–03)
- Optus (Australia)
- 3 (Australia)
- Telstra (Australia)
- AirTel India

=== Motorola Retail markets supporting SCREEN3 ===
- Australia
- Hong Kong
- India
- Indonesia
- United Kingdom
- Taiwan
