= Motorola Rizr Z3 =

Mobile phone model

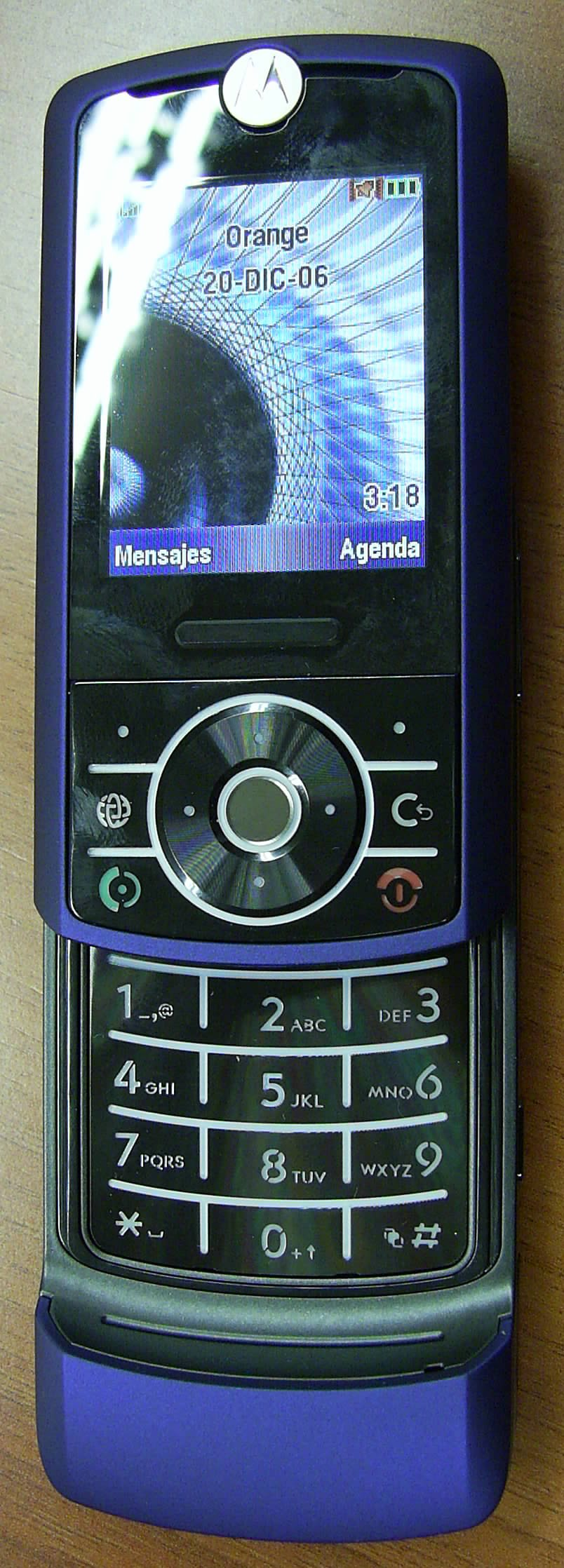
- First released: Q4 2006
- Successor: Motorola ROKR Z6
- Compatible networks: GSM 850/900/1800/1900 (quad band) with EDGE / GPRS
- Dimensions: 105×45×17 mm (4.13×1.77×0.67 in)
- Weight: 111 g (4 oz)
- Memory: 20 MB internal, microSD (TransFlash) external memory card slot
- Display: 176 x 220 1.9" 262K-color TFT LCD
- Connectivity: mini-USB, Bluetooth (Class 2)

The Motorola Rizr Z3 (stylised RIZR V3), also marketed as MotoRizr Z3, is a slider-style mobile phone made by Motorola for GSM networks, and the first product under the RIZR name. It was announced on July 24, 2006 and released in the final quarter of 2006. In the US, T-Mobile officially made the phone available on March 21, 2007. The Rizr Z3 is essentially a slider version of the Motorola Razr V3 with the same metallic looks and keypad and other design similarities.

The Z3 was succeeded by the Linux-running Rizr/Rokr Z6 and the Symbian-running Rizr 8.

== Features ==
The Rizr Z3 is a quad-band GSM phone. It runs on the proprietary P2K operating system with Motorola SCREEN3 push technology for dynamic news and content, and support for MP3, MIDI, WAV, AAC, and IMY (IMELODY) audio files in the MP3 player, as well as MPEG-4 video and JPEG still image capture. It has support for MMS and Wireless Village instant messaging and e-mail as well as AIM, ICQ, Windows Live Messenger, or Yahoo! Messenger. The phone has Bluetooth stereo A2DP support and expandable memory (microSD). The camera is 2.0 megapixels resolution and has a video recorder too. Push to Talk over Cellular (PoC) is also supported.

== Design and appearance ==
The Rizr Z3 uses a technical form factor, where the user can push on a plastic push bar located under the screen in order to open the phone. When opened, the top portion slides upwards, revealing the standard keys (including numeric, star, and pound keys). These keys are covered when the phone is closed, but the remaining keys, including the side keys, can be used normally once the keypad is unlocked; such keys can be set to automatically lock shortly after the device is closed to prevent accidental activation when in a purse or pocket.

It also has 2 mini lights, located at either side of the Motorola logo above the screen. The mini light on the left (from the user's point of view) is a green charging light, which displays when the phone is charging and the mini light on the right (again also from the POV) is a blue bluetooth light displayed in periods when connected to an audio device (e.g. bluetooth headset, earpiece etc.) or flashes rapidly for a short time when another bluetooth device requests a file transfer. One of the primary uses of the device when closed is as a landscape still or video camera. When operating in landscape mode, the user holds the phone on its side (90 degrees counter-clockwise), such that the camera key is positioned near the right index finger. The screen text and icons are also rotated, so that they appear normally when held in this fashion. This gives the impression of the phone being more like a traditional camera.

The Rizr Z3 is available in three colors, black, blue, and pink (as a T-Mobile Online Exclusive).

A chronic problem of the center select button cover falling off was reported by many users, although the button cover is not necessary for the button to work. Another problem found is that when charging the phone when it is shut down, and then the charger is taken out, it makes the charging noise louder than usual, even when the phone is in silent mode. Other than these two problems, the phone has received accolades for its good call quality and solid construction, despite reports of instability of the Motorola OS.

== See also ==
- Motorola Rokr
