= SLVR =

SLVR or Slvr may refer to:

- Viru Viru International Airport, in Santa Cruz de la Sierra, Bolivia, ICAO code SLVR
- Motorola Slvr, a mobile phone
