= Z10 =

Z10 may refer to:

- BlackBerry Z10, a smartphone
- CAIC Z-10, an attack helicopter developed by the People's Republic of China.
- German destroyer Z10 Hans Lody
- IBM System z10, a mainframe
- IQOO Z10, an Android smartphone
- Motorola Motorizr Z10, a mobile phone
