= A780 =

A780 may refer to:

- Motorola A780, a mobile phone
- Westernport Highway, a road in Australia
