= SL-10 =

SL-10 or SL10 may refer to:

== Technology ==
- Polyot (rocket), type 11A59, used from 1963-1964
- Technics SL-10, an automatic turntable produced from 1979-1985

=== Mobile devices ===
- Sony CLIÉ PEG-SL10, a personal digital assistant released by Sony in 2002
- Siemens SL10, a mobile phone created by Siemens Mobile

== Other uses ==
- London Buses route SL10
