= Motorola Krzr =

Cell phone released in 2006-2007

Motorola Krzr K1

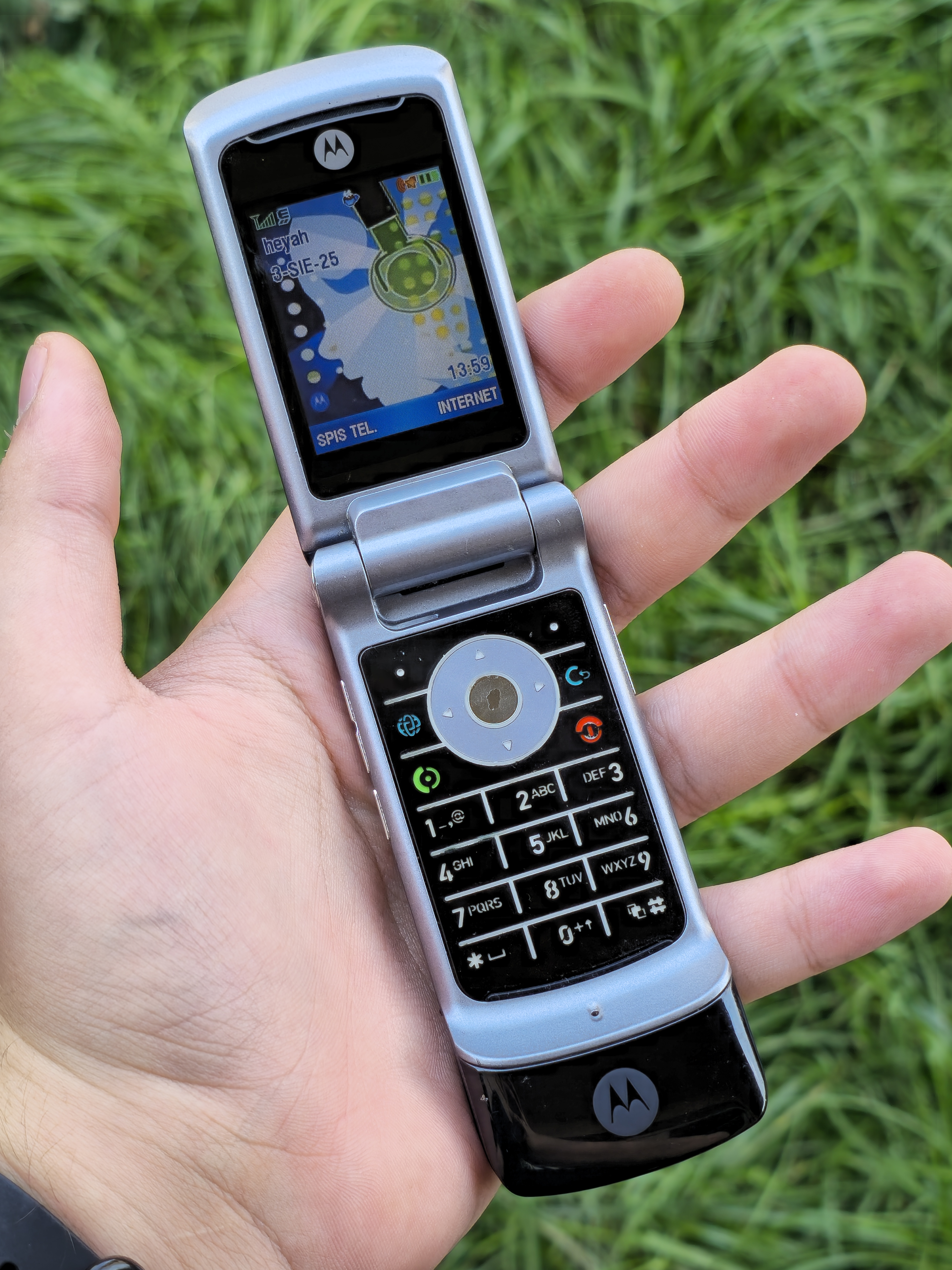
- Availability by region: 10 July 2006
- Compatible networks: GSM 850/900/1800/1900 (quad band)
- Dimensions: 4.05" x 1.65" x 0.63" (103 x 45 x 16 mm)
- Weight: 100 g / 3.6 oz
- Memory: 20 or 64 MB (see article)
- Rear camera: 2.0-megapixel
- Display: 176×220 pixel 262,000 color TFT LCD
- Connectivity: mini-USB, Bluetooth (Class 2)

Motorola Krzr K1 (styled KRZR (pronounced "crazer" /ˈkreɪzər/), also marketed as Motokrzr K1) is a clamshell mobile phone developed and marketed by Motorola. The Krzr K1 was announced on 1 July 2006 with a design that is longer but narrower than the Motorola Razr V3. During development, it was codenamed "Canary" and had earlier been named Razr K1.

The K1 used the motosync system to synchronize contacts and the calendar with the touch of a button. It also used the Push-To-View system for sharing of images in real-time. The phone included stylized features such as a glossy glass finish. It has a smaller sized display compared to Razr due to the different physical body.

A GSM/EDGE model was released by AT&T, Rogers Wireless, T-Mobile, SunCom Wireless and Cincinnati Bell Wireless, and a CDMA 1x/EV-DO model was released by Pocket Communications, Verizon Wireless, Sprint, US Cellular, Alltel, Virgin Mobile Canada and Boost Mobile as Krzr K1m. An updated successor, Krzr K3, was released in 2007 which is also 3G.

== Specifications ==
- Bands (K1): GSM 850/900/1800/1900 (quad band) with EDGE (Class 10) / GPRS
- Dimensions (H x W x D) : 103 x 42 x 16 mm
- Mass: 100 g (3.6 ounces)
- Display: 176 x 220 262K-color TFT LCD
- Camera: 2.0-megapixel (1600x1200) with 8x digital zoom. MPEG-4 video CIF 352*288 (15 frames) and JPEG still image capture.
- Storage: 20 MB internal memory, MicroSD slot allows for up to 2 GB external memory
- Audio Playback: Supports MP3, AAC, and AAC+
- Connectivity: Bluetooth 2.0, including A2DP stereo profile. Mini-USB.
- Push to Talk over Cellular (PoC) and Push to view (PTV) capable.
- Motorola SCREEN3 push technology for dynamic news and content.
- Java ME games and screen savers.
- Buttons (lightweight): TFT "L-tee" metal buttons with raised rubber padding for 5, up, down, left, right directions.
- Colors offered: cosmic blue, fire red, summit gold, silver quartz, dark gray, and black.

=== K1m ===
The K1m is the CDMA version of the K1. The main difference between the two is that the K1m has touch music controls on the flip cover, a 1.3 megapixel camera, supports a microSD memory card up to 1 GB, but does not have stereo Bluetooth headphone (A2DP) capabilities, whereas, the K1 doesn't have the touch music controls, but has a better, 2.0 megapixel camera, supports a MicroSD card up to a higher 2 GB, and is A2DP capable.

- Bands: CDMA 1x/EV-DO 800/1900
- Dimensions (H x W x D) : 103 x 44 x 17 mm
- Mass: 103 g (3.63 ounces)
- Display: 176 x 220 65K-color TFT LCD
- Camera: 1.3 megapixel (1280x1024) with 8x digital zoom. MPEG-4 video (15 frame/s) and JPEG still image capture.
- Storage: 20 MB internal memory, MicroSD slot allows for additional external memory
- Audio Playback: Supports MP3, MP4 with AAC encoding and WMA, although WMA is only available on models provided by Verizon Wireless and require the Verizon Wireless Music CD software to manage with a PC. Additionally, there are external touch sensitive music controls on the front of the phone.
- Connectivity: Bluetooth 2.0, albeit without A2DP stereo profile; MiniUSB.
- Java ME or BREW (carrier dependent) games and screen savers.
- Offered in steel, black, white and red colors.

== Successor ==
A second Krzr phone was launched in February 2007, the Motorola K3, which notably is also 3G-capable. It has a redesigned keypad, an improved display, a front camera, and increases internal memory.

=== Specifications ===
- Bands (K1): GSM 900/1800/1900 (tri-band) with EDGE (Class 12) / GPRS, UMTS/HSDPA 2100
- Dimensions (H x W x D) : 103.2 x 42.3 x 16.3 mm
- Mass: 105 g
- Display: 240 x 320 262K-color TFT LCD
- Camera: 2.0-megapixel with 8x digital zoom. MPEG-4 video (15 frames) and JPEG still image capture.
- Storage: 60 MB internal memory, MicroSD slot allows for up to 2 GB external memory
- Audio Playback: Supports MP3
- Connectivity: Bluetooth 2.0, including A2DP stereo profile. Mini-USB.
- Java ME games and screen savers.
- Buttons (lightweight): TFT "L-tee" metal buttons with raised rubber padding for 5, up, down, left, right directions.
- Opera Mini browser

== See also ==
- Motorola RAZR
- Motorola RIZR
