= Motorola Rizr Z8 =

Motorola Z8
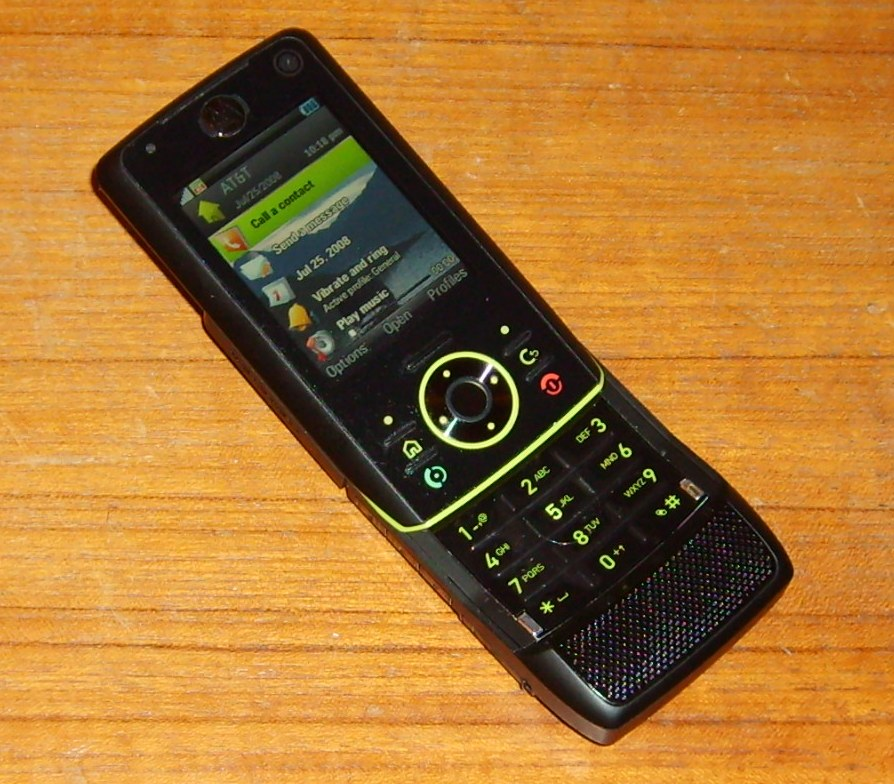
- Manufacturer: Motorola
- Availability by region: July 2007
- Successor: Motorola Rizr Z10
- Related: Motorola RIZR Z6
- Compatible networks: GSM 850/900/1800/1900 (quad-band)
- Form factor: Kick-slider (slider with extra hinge to conform to face)
- Dimensions: 109×50×15 mm (4.29×1.97×0.59 in)
- Weight: 112 g (3.95 oz)
- Operating system: Symbian OS v9.2, UIQ v3.1
- CPU: TI OMAP 2420 (ARM11)
- Memory: 90 MB internal memory
- Removable storage: microSD, microSDHC (TransFlash) cards (up to 32 GB)
- Battery: Li-ion 1030 mAh
- Rear camera: 2.0-megapixel, 8× zoom, LED flash
- Front camera: VGA for videocalling
- Display: 240×320 pixels 16 million (32bit) color TFT LCD; 240 × 320 pixels
- External display: N/A
- Connectivity: mini-USB, Bluetooth (Class 2), GPRS, EDGE, HSDPA
- Data inputs: Keypad

Motorola Rizr Z8 (stylised RIZR Z8, pronounced as "riser"), also known as Motorola Moto Z8, is a 3G smartphone developed by Motorola announced in February 2007 and released in July 2007 becoming the company's flagship smartphone in European and Asian markets. The Z8 runs Symbian OS (9.2) with the UIQ 3.1 interface, although it does not have a touchscreen as per usual for UIQ. It was also Motorola's first device running Symbian in several years.

The Z8 is notable for having a unique variant of the slider form factor that has been referred to as "kick-slider", and less frequently as "banana". It has an extra hinge that curves so as to conform to user's face. The phone was succeeded by Motorola Rizr Z10 in 2008 which continued this same form factor.

== Features ==
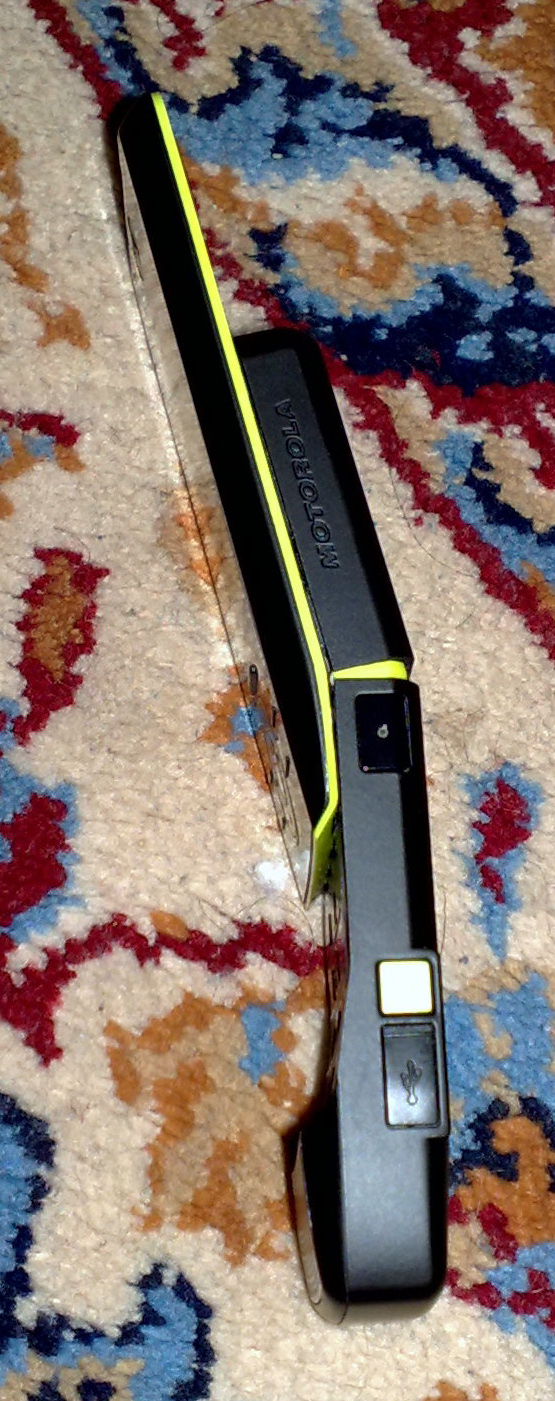
Motorola RIZR Z8 side view

The phone features a 2-megapixel camera, a 16 million color QVGA display, Bluetooth 2.0 with A2DP, a 3.6 Mbit/s HSDPA connection, an EDGE class 10 connection, and 90 megabytes of internal memory. The internal memory is expandable to 32 gigabytes using high-capacity microSDHC (TransFlash) cards.

Although the phone runs version 3.1 of UIQ, it uses a physical keypad for navigation instead of a touch display. Motorola ported the UIQ interface, to this non-touch form.

== History ==
The Motorola Z8 was the company's first handset running Symbian since the Motorola A1000 in 2004. The Z8's announcement at the 2007 3GSM congress was considered to have been surprising or unexpected. Much of the engineering of the phone had been done by former Sendo engineers (who made the Symbian Sendo X years earlier).

The Motorola Rizr Z8 was considered one of two successors to the original Motorola Rizr (Z3) - the other being the Motorola Rizr Z6. Unlike the Z8, which runs Symbian/UIQ, the Z6 runs on MotoMagx Linux.

At launch, the Z8 was described by Motorola CEO Edward Zander as a "multimedia monster".

=== Release ===
==== United Kingdom ====
In the UK, the Rizr Z8 was available exclusively on Vodafone for the first few weeks of its launch; O2 began offering the phone later; Currently Orange UK is testing the handset in preparation for the Christmas rush of new handsets, they claim if successful it will be available late November. Additionally, both Motorola direct and resellers offer a SIM-free, unlocked version of the phone for use on other networks. All versions of the Rizr Z8 released in the United Kingdom come with a free microSD card containing a copy of the motion picture The Bourne Identity.

==== United States ====
Motorola did not release the phone in the US, Canada, or Australia, but it did register the phone with the US FCC, thereby approving it for use in the USA. As a result, many American specialty phone stores carried the phone, and residents in these countries could order unlocked versions of the handset.

== Z10 ==
The Motorola Rizr Z10 was the successor to the Z8, released in June 2008 in Europe and Asia. Additionally, it had been rumored that in the United States, carrier T-Mobile would release the phone in 2008 to introduce its new 3G UMTS/HSDPA network, however, this never happened.

The Z10 restyled the phone from the lime green to a more mainstream black and silver look It has other upgraded features, although still lacks Wi-Fi and GPS that were present on some other handsets of its class at the time. The Z10 is 12 grams lighter. It features an upgraded camera module (3.2 megapixels with autofocus). The phone is powered by the newer Symbian OS 9.2 UIQ 3.2. Rizr Z10 was Motorola's last Symbian device.
