= Motorola Razr2 =

Cell phone released in 2007

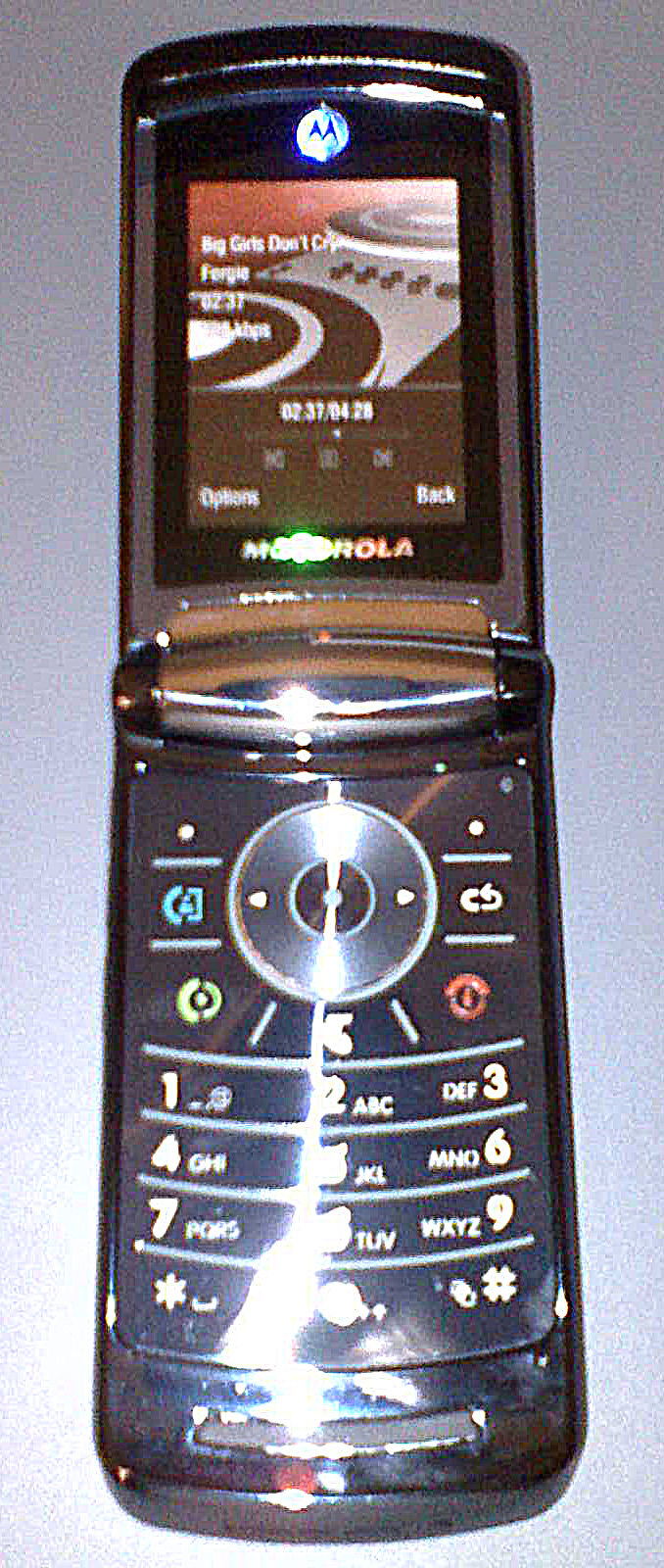
- Motorola Razr2 V9
- Manufacturer: Motorola
- Family: Motorola Razr
- First released: June 29, 2007; 18 years ago
- Predecessor: Motorola Razr (V3/V3i/V3x/V3xx); Motorola Razr Maxx (V6)
- Compatible networks: V8: GSM/GPRS/EDGE; V9/V9x: GSM/GPRS/EDGE/HSDPA; V9m: CDMA2000/EV-DO
- Dimensions: V9: 103 x 53 x 13.3 mm (4.06 x 2.09 x 0.52 in); V8/V9m: 103 x 53 x 11.9 mm (4.06 x 2.09 x 0.47 in)
- Weight: V8: 117 g (4.1 oz); V9: 125 g (4.4 oz)
- Memory: 420 MB or 2 GB internal memory
- Rear camera: 2 MP
- Display: 240×320 pixels, TFT LCD, 256,000 colours

The Motorola Razr2, stylized as Motorola RAZR^{2}, is a clamshell mobile phone designed and developed by Motorola, announced on May 16, 2007. The Razr2 is the second-generation Razr, succeeding the Motorola Razr V3 and its derivatives and also the Motorola Razr Maxx V6. The Razr2 was released in 2G EDGE (model no. V8), 3G HSDPA (V9) and 3G EV-DO (V9m) variants.

The most prominent feature in the Razr2 is the large external display with touch-sensitive buttons and haptic feedback. It allows users to use some functions of the phone without opening up the flip. Compared to the previous Razrs, Razr2 also has Motorola's CrystalTalk technology to improve call quality and help reduce background noise. While the Razr2 V9 and V9m run on Motorola's previous software platform called P2K (based on Versatile Real-Time Executive), the Razr2 V8 runs MotoMagx, based on the MontaVista Linux OS.

== Release and versions ==
The GSM version of the Razr2, the Motorola Razr2 V8, was released in July 2007 around the world. As of October 15, 2007, T-Mobile US had offered the V8 model.

The 3G version, Motorola Razr2 V9, was released on September 1, 2007, and was exclusively made available through AT&T in the US. The V9 was also released in Europe, Asia, and Latin America. AT&T's device version did not have the same external screen capabilities as the International version.

An enhanced version of the V9, named the V9x, was released in December 2008 for AT&T (US), Rogers Wireless (Canada) and Telstra (Australia). This model has additional features such as GPS and microSDHC memory card support. AT&T's V9x also gained the same external screen features the International version of the V9 came with. It also came with "AT&T Navigator" GPS software.

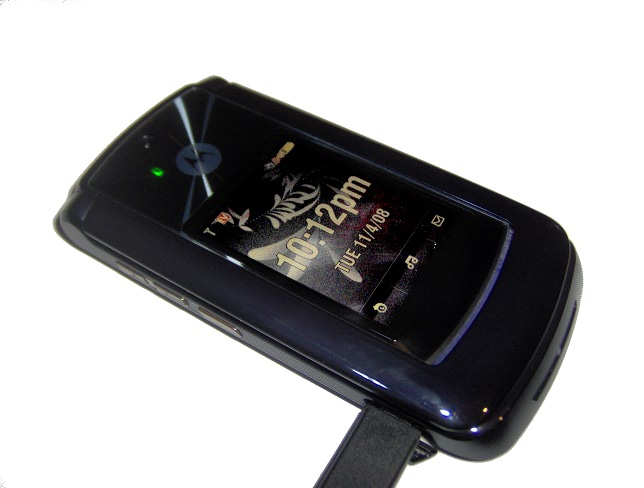
Exterior of a Motorola Razr2 V9m showing the large external display

The Motorola Razr2 V9m, which is the EV-DO version of the Razr2 series, was released through SK Telecom on June 29, 2007 in South Korea. Verizon Wireless released the V9m in the US on August 29, 2007, followed by Sprint, Alltel and other CDMA carriers.

=== Special editions ===
A Luxury Edition version of the Razr2 V8 was released in time for the 2007 holiday season featuring 18k gold-plated accents and a soft snake-skin-like back.

A Ferrari Edition of the Razr2 V9 was released in June 2008 in Asia, Europe, and Latin America. It featured a Ferrari logo on the back of the phone, a Ferrari-branded leather case, and pre-loaded Ferrari wallpapers and ringtones.

== Features ==
The Motorola Razr2 (all variants) has a 256K color TFT internal display with a size of 2.2 inches, while a 2.0 inch QVGA external display is on the outside. The external display has touch-sensitive buttons that allow users to play music through this screen without opening up the device. There is a 2 megapixel camera, although with no flash, and a video camera shooting at QCIF resolution. There is Bluetooth connectivity (version 2.0) although there is no Wi-Fi nor is there an IrDA port.

The Razr2 V8 and V9m models are 11.9 mm (0.47 in) thick, whereas the Razr2 V9 is 13.7 mm (0.54 in), due to its more advanced capabilities and larger battery capacity. However the V9's thickness is still less than the Motorola Razr V3 (13.9 mm (0.55 in)).

The V8 model of the Razr2 runs MotoMagx, an in-house mobile Linux operating system, whereas the other Razr2 models do not. The V8 has EDGE data speeds and a 500 MHz processor, whereas the V9 (and V9x) features faster 3.6 Mbit/s HSDPA speeds and has powerful (for its time) 512 MHz CPU. The V9m features 2 Mbit/s EV-DO data speeds, although its processor is half the speed of the V9. All models except V8 have microSD slots for expandable memory.

The later V9x model came with an improved user interface compared to the previous V9, video telephony and GPS technology.

== Marketing ==
The television commercial features the song "Le Disko" from the electronica band Shiny Toy Guns. Also featured are models Nikolett Barabas and Matt Mullins in a fight scene involving using the phones to slash each other's clothes (like a namesake razor).

A Razr2 commercial by Sprint for North America features several RAZR2s impaled into various objects. It then shows Eric Mangini, then head coach of the NFL's New York Jets, watching on his Razr2 highlights of a Jets game that were critical of the team's performance; he flings the phone in disgust, with the phone impaling a car.

== Reception ==
Compared to sales of the first generation Motorola Razr V3, the Motorola Razr2 V8 and V9 only achieved half as many sales during the same time period after launch. Approximately 2 million Razr2 units were sold by the end of 2007. The Razr2 was considered too similar to the first Razr to customers, which was being sold free on contract compared to $300 for the Razr2. Analysts considered that rival manufacturers built more innovative and different products. Apple's iPhone outsold the Razr2 in the third quarter of 2007.

== Related phones ==
In April 2009 at CTIA, Motorola announced the Motorola Z9 which is essentially a Razr2 in a slider form factor, although does not carry the Razr2 moniker nor the Rizr name. It is 3G with GPS and a 2.4" QVGA screen. The phone was released in the United States as an AT&T carrier exclusive, where it came pre-loaded with its AT&T Navigator application with a-GPS support. The device was also available through Movistar in Venezuela. An updated version, Motorola Z9n, brought new media and location apps, and was again released as an AT&T exclusive in the US.

== Canceled successor ==
"Ruby" was the leaked codename for a next generation Razr3, (stylized RAZR^{3}) handset, widely reported on the web. Leaked specs showed that the Razr3 was going to run Symbian OS with UIQ 3.0, would feature HSDPA, GPS, a 5-megapixel camera, and a 2-inch external touchscreen. On November 29, 2008, it was reported that Motorola canceled the Ruby. It has been suggested that Motorola's axing of Symbian and Linux platforms in favor of moving to Android was a reason for the cancellation. Motorola's first released Android products were the Cliq/Dext and the Droid/Milestone, neither of which followed the Razr style and form.

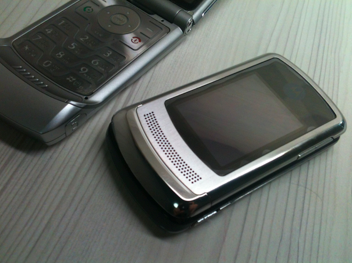
The Motorola V13

However in early 2009 official shots of a prototype model dubbed 'VE1' were leaked online by Mobile-Review.com. In April 2009, the Motorola V10 was made official in South Korea, which is an evolutionary Razr2 although does not carry the 'RAZR' name, instead uses the 'MOTO' moniker. It was one of several exclusive Korean Motorolas released around that time, others being the Rokr ZN50 and the Pebl VU20. Later in 2009, it was reported that Ruby had been resurrected for the South Korean market. It was eventually released by carrier SK Telecom on November 6, 2009 as Motorola MOTO Klassic V13. It has 303 MB on board memory, an external touchscreen, EV-DO speeds and a 5.0 megapixel camera with auto focus and LED flash.

== See also ==
- Motorola Razr
- Sony Ericsson W980
- Nokia 6650 fold
- Motorola V950 Renegade
