= Motorola V950 Renegade =

Mobile phone

Motorola Renegade v950
- Compatible networks: CDMA (Sprint PCS)
- Form factor: Clamshell (flip)
- Dimensions: 53 mm × 104 mm × 17 mm (2.09 in × 4.09 in × 0.67 in)
- Weight: 118 g (4.2 oz)
- Memory: MicroSD up to 8GB, and internal memory
- Display: 2.2" 240x320 internal, 1.6" 120x160 external
- Connectivity: Bluetooth, Micro USB

The Motorola v950 "Renegade" is a clamshell style mobile phone, using CDMA technology. It is MIL-STD-810 certified. The base phone model is a Motorola RAZR.

The Motorola Renegade was released exclusively for Sprint, but unregistered phones can be registered to other CDMA networks.
