= MotoMagx =

MOTOMAGX
- Developer: Motorola
- OS family: Linux (Unix-like)
- Working state: Discontinued
- Kernel type: Monolithic (Linux)
- Official website: MOTODEV > Technologies > MOTOMAGX

MotoMagx (stylized MOTOMAGX) is a former Linux kernel-based mobile operating system developed and launched in 2007 by Motorola to run on their mid-to-high-end mobile phones. The system was based on MontaVista's Mobilinux. Originally intended for 60% of their upcoming devices, it was soon dropped in favor of Android and Windows Mobile operating systems.

MotoMagx was only compatible with Motorola's GSM/UMTS devices. This was due to the lack of an implementation compatible with Qualcomm CDMA2000 devices. As a result, Motorola often sold multiple device variants with radically different firmware. For example, the Motorola Razr2 on T-Mobile shipped with MotoMagx, whereas the Razr2 on Verizon Wireless shipped with Motorola's P2K firmware. This created significant confusion for customers, as the user experience varied widely between two otherwise identical devices, simply based on which carrier they were on.

== Devices ==
Phones based on this OS are:

- Motorola EM30
- Motorola Debut i856
- Motorola Rokr E2
- Motorola Rokr E8
- Motorola Rokr/Rizr Z6
- Motorola U9
- Motorola Razr2 V8
- Motorola VE66
- Motorola Zine ZN5
- Motorola Tundra V76r
- Motorola Rokr EM35
- Motorola ZN200
