= D-Link G604T network adaptor =

The DSL-G604T is a first D-Link Wireless/ADSL router which firmware is based on open source the MontaVista Linux. The DSL-G604T was introduced in November 2004. This model has been discontinued.

== Specifications ==
=== Hardware ===
- CPU: Texas Instrument AR7W MIPS 4KEc based SoC with built-in ADSL and Ethernet interfaces
- DRAM Memory: 16Mb
- Flash Memory: 2Mb SquashFS file system
- Wi-Fi: TI MiniPCI card
- Ethernet: 5-port Ethernet hub (1 internal, 4 external)

=== Firmware ===
The G604T runs MontaVista and busybox Linux which allows a degree of customisation with customised firmware. These and similar units from D-Link appear to have an issue that causes certain services to fail when using the factory provided firmware, namely the Debian package update service being interrupted due to a faulty DNS through DHCP issue at the kernel level. A v2.00B06.AU_20060728 patch was made available through their downloads section that provided some level of correction, but it was not a complete fix and the issue would resurface intermittently. When the issue was originally reported, D-Link seemed to have misunderstood that the same issue has been discovered by the Linux community at large to be common across a number of their router models and they failed to provide a complete fix across the board for all ADSL router models.

Russian version of the firmware (prefix .RU, e.g. V1.00B02T02.RU.20041014) has restrictions on configuring firewall rules – user can only change sender's address (computer address in the LAN segment) and the recipient's port. The web interface with Russian firmware also differs from the English interface.

=== Default settings ===
When running the D-link DSL-G604T router for the first time (or resetting), the device is configured with a default IP address (192.168.1.1), username (admin) and password (admin). Default username and password can also be printed on the router itself, in the manual, or on the box.

== Problems ==
=== Security ===
D-Link DSL-G604T has Cross-site scripting (XSS) vulnerability in cgi-bin/webcm on the router allows remote attackers to inject arbitrary web script or HTML via the var:category parameter, as demonstrated by a request for advanced/portforw.htm on the fan page.

Directory traversal vulnerability in webcam in the D-Link DSL-G604T Wireless ADSL Router Modem allows remote attackers to read arbitrary files via an absolute path in the getpage parameter.

When /cgi-bin/firmwarecfg is executed, allows remote attackers to bypass authentication if their IP address already exists in /var/tmp/fw_ip or if their request is the first, which causes /var/tmp/fw_ip to be created and contain their IP address.

=== Noise ===
Owners reported that the router emitted a low, high-pitched sound when the ADSL line was synchronized.

== Reception ==
The DSL-G604T received positive reviews, receiving an 7.9/10 from PCActual, 3/5 from PCWorld. According to CNET, "DSL-G604T is a ADSL2/2+ modem router with some serious stability issues".

== Similar models ==
The DSL-G624T, DSL-G664T and DSL-G684T routers are very similar to the G604T.
