= Motorola Zine ZN5 =

Series of mobile phones

MotoZine ZN5
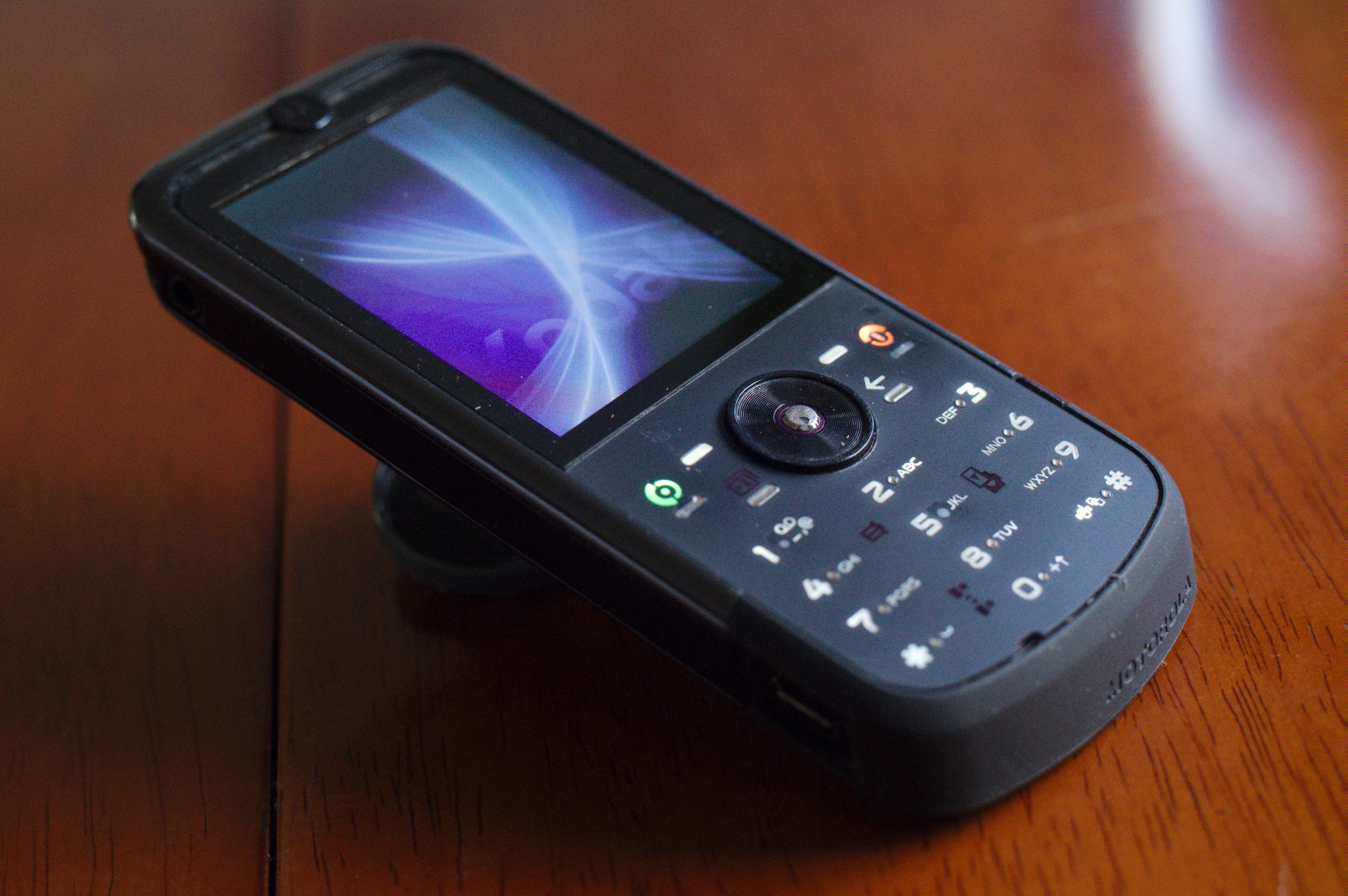
- Manufacturer: Motorola
- Compatible networks: GSM quad band (850/900/1800/1900) with GPRS, EDGE
- Form factor: Candybar
- Dimensions: 118 mm × 50.5 mm × 12-16 mm
- Weight: 114 g (4.0 oz)
- Memory: 392 MB internal memory, 120 MB ROM
- Removable storage: microSD cards (officially up to 4 GB, supports HC)
- Battery: Li-ion 950 mAh
- Rear camera: 5.0 megapixel, 4x zoom, AF, Xenon Flash
- Display: Screen manufacturer: Sharp Corporation(Japan); Type: Transflective TFT; Colors: 262K; Display Color Depth: 18bit/pixel (262144 scales); Size: 240 x 320 pixels(2.4 inches); Dot Pitch: 166.6 pixel/inch;
- External display: N/A
- Connectivity: microUSB#Mini.2C_Micro 2.0, 3.5 mm headphone jack, Bluetooth Class 2, Wi-Fi 802.11 b/g/i

Motorola Zine ZN5 (pronounced "zeen", stylized ZINE ZN5), or the MotoZine, is a candybar mobile phone from Motorola. The ZN5 was released in China in July 2008, and in November 2008 for T-Mobile US, becoming the first phone equipped with a 5.0 megapixel camera to be subsidized on a major US carrier. It was also released for sale in Central and Eastern Europe.

The Zine’s operating system was MotoMagx. It was the first Motorola phone to include a 5.0MP camera and one of the few at the time with Wi-Fi, though it did not support T-Mobile's Hotspot@Home service. It features Motorola's then-new ModeShift technology, introduced in July 2008 on the Rokr E8. It includes Kodak Imaging Technology and Kodak Perfect Touch Technology that supposedly makes photos brighter and sharper. The camera software allows saving RAW pictures in the lossless TIFF format.

It is the earliest known mobile phone to feature a variable aperture camera, adjusting between f/2.8 and f/5.6.
