= Motorola Rokr E6 =

Mobile phone model by Motorola

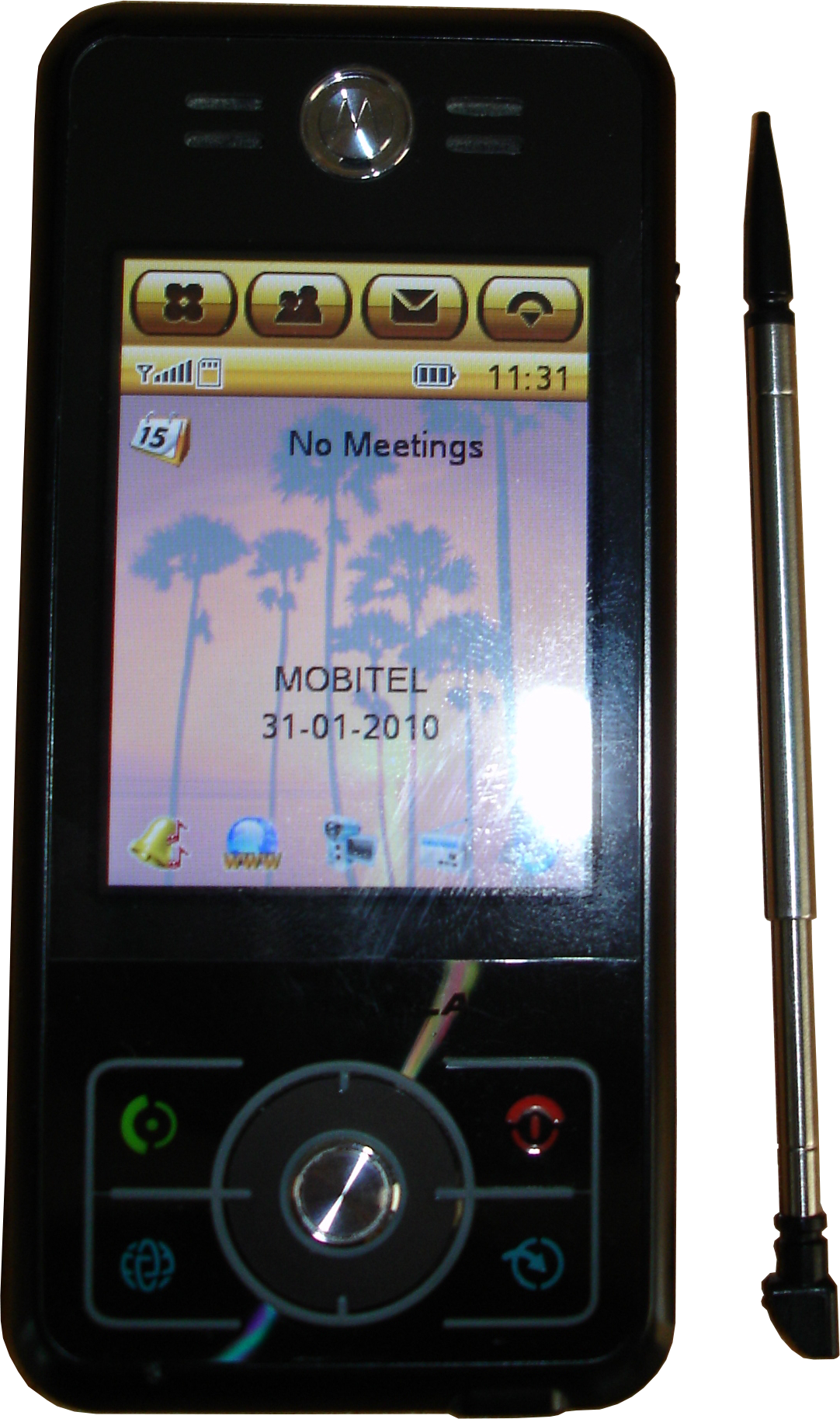
- Manufacturer: Motorola
- Availability by region: November 14, 2006 (China); December 4, 2006 (Worldwide)
- Predecessor: Motorola Rokr E2
- Successor: Motorola Z6
- Compatible networks: GSM Tri-band (900/1800/1900, hackable to Quad-band)
- Dimensions: 111×51.5×14 mm (4.37×2.03×0.55 in) (82 cc)
- Weight: 122 g (4 oz)
- Operating system: MontaVista Linux OS (not MOTOMAGX)
- CPU: Intel XScale-PXA27x rev 7 (v5l)
- Memory: 46 MB RAM (50% free after boot-up)
- Storage: 120 MB
- Removable storage: SD/MMC expandable to 4 GB (New patch)
- Battery: Li-ion 1000 mAh
- Rear camera: 2 megapixels + Macro Mode
- Display: 2.4 in diagonal touch TFT LCD, 262k colors, 240×320 pixels
- Connectivity: GPRS Class 10; BCM2045 Bluetooth 2.0 (+A2DP); 3.5 mm Stereo/Mic Jack; Enhanced Mini USB
- Data inputs: Touchscreen with stylus

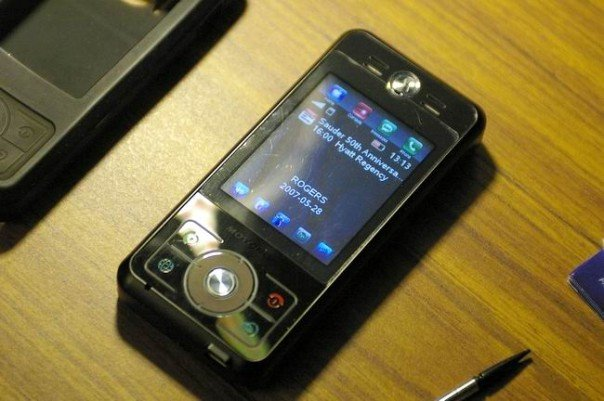
Rokr E6

Motorola Rokr E6 is a smartphone developed by Motorola first released in China on November 14, 2006, and subsequently worldwide on December 4, 2006. The Rokr E6 is a direct descendant of the E680 and the MING, sharing the same Montavista Linux operating system, Intel XScale PXA270 series processors, and the RealPlayer media player.

The E6 features a built-in FM radio (but no radio recording). It also inherited the 2-megapixel camera with manual macro-switching and business card recognition from MING, enhanced with QR Code recognition functions. Additionally, the phone features a 3.5 mm headphone jack, allowing use of a standard-sized headphone plug.

It comes installed with Picsel Viewer with the ability to read Microsoft Office and PDF file formats.

The Rokr E6 was the third product under the ROKR name, following Rokr E1 and Rokr E2, although it was fundamentally different than those two.

== Details ==
The phone is part of Motorola's line of phones running Linux, this one using a modified 2.4.20 kernel. This has upset some, as they broke the GPL in not releasing the kernel source code. The software is an updated version of MING (Motorola A1200), with a different file system. Most of the apps that work on the MING work on the E6, but some may not due to the file system. Normally the phone only runs on tri-band GSM networks, though some have found an exploit to get it to run on Quad Band networks and over Edge. The radio channel frequency can also be modified beyond 88 MHz to 65 MHz, and the preset number of channels can also be modified.

== Technical specifications ==
Battery Life	Up to 7 hours talk time - about 235 hours standby
Web Camera	Yes, via USB
Voice Recording	Yes (.amr)
Video Recording	Yes, up to CIF 352×288 (.3gp)
Maximum number of Sockets	10
Browsers	Opera Mini with support for HTTP, HTTPS, Socket, Secure Socket, UDP
Image Support	.PNG, .GIF, .BMP, .JPEG, .EMS, .WMP
Encoding schemes	USASCII, UTF-8 (Unicode), UTF-16 with explicit Byte Order Mark (Part of IOP), UCS-2
Messaging	SMS, MMS
E-mail	POP3, IMAP4, SMTP
Java	Yes, CLDC v1.1 and MIDP v2.0 compliant
FCC ID	Yes
