= Motorola Z6 =

Mobile phone model by Motorola

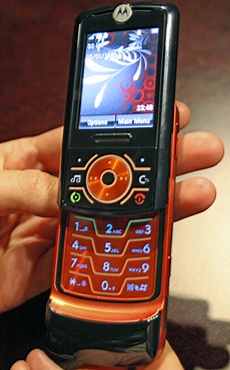
- Manufacturer: Motorola
- Predecessor: Motorola Rizr Z3; Motorola Rokr E6
- Successor: Motorola Rokr E8
- Related: Motorola Rizr Z8
- Compatible networks: GSM quad-band with EDGE
- Dimensions: 105.5×45.5×16 mm (4.15×1.79×0.63 in)
- Weight: 115g / 4.06 oz
- Operating system: MOTOMAGX
- CPU: Freescale MXC275-30; 32-bit 528 MHz ARM11
- Memory: 64 MB available to user, 96 MB ROM, 64 MB SDRAM
- Removable storage: microSD (TransFlash) card up to 2 GB
- Battery: BC50 3.7V at 750mah
- Rear camera: 2.0 MPix with LED flash
- Display: 2.1 in diagonal TFT LCD, 320×240 px, 262,000 colors
- Connectivity: mini-USB; Bluetooth (Class 2) + A2DP

The Motorola Z6, variously marketed under the ROKR or RIZR monikers, is a 2G slider-style mobile phone or smartphone from Motorola introduced in January 2007 and released on July 7, 2007 as a successor to the original Motorola Rizr (Z3). While cosmetically identical, the ROKR Z6 is internally different and Motorola's new version of the embedded Linux-based operating system, MOTOMAGX. The ROKR Z6m is a CDMA variant that runs on Verizon Wireless's own software.

== Features ==
It also supports stereo Bluetooth technology (A2DP) and features a 2-megapixel digital camera. The Z6 also supports synchronisation with Windows Media Player 11, allowing playlists and audio to be transferred to the phone's internal memory, which can in turn be transferred onto a compatible microSD memory card. 2 inch QVGA display, 2.5mm stereo jack, Stereo Bluetooth, microSD slot and multimedia player for music and videos.

== Z6w ==
The Motorola Z6w, also known as MOTO Z6w, was introduced at 2008's Mobile World Congress. It is a slightly modified version of the Motorola ROKR Z6 (GSM), but features an improved user interface and Wi-Fi. The phone was available to carriers in the first half of 2008.

== ROKR Z6m ==
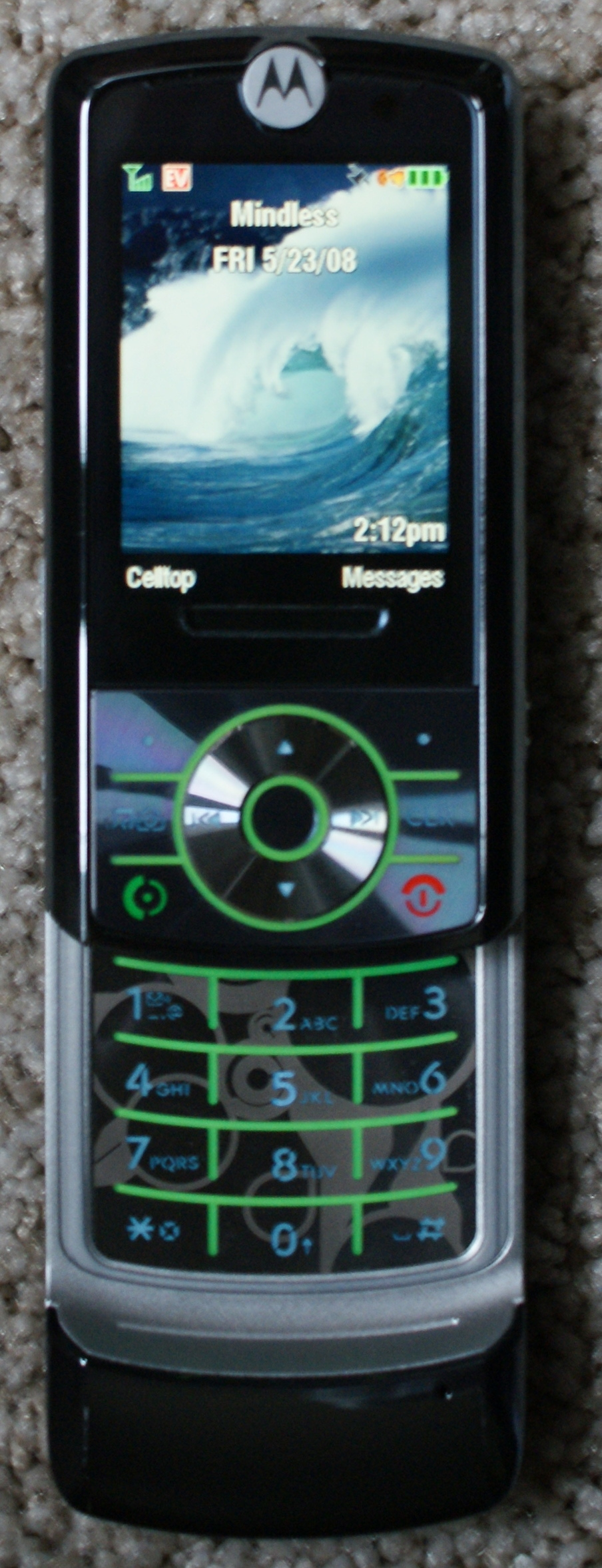
Motorola Z6m

The Z6m is the CDMA version of the Rokr Z6. The Rokr Z6m features 1xEV-DO data and comes with an integrated music player, 3.5 mm headset jack, stereo Bluetooth, a 512 MB MicroSD card in its respective slot, a key lock switch, and a 2-megapixel digital camera. The phone supports up to 2 GB of removable storage.

Unlike the Z6, the Z6m does not run MotoMagx but instead runs on a Binary Runtime Environment for Wireless (BREW) platform.

U.S. Cellular was the first carrier to release the Rokr Z6m on October 14, 2007, alongside their Napster-to-Go service's launch.

== RIZR Z6tv ==
September 2007 saw the release of the Rizr Z6tv, a Verizon Wireless exclusive phone for the US and was one of the first Verizon devices to come with its MediaFLO-based V CAST Mobile TV application pre-loaded, which allowed users to play popular American TV shows.

=== Technical information ===
When connected to a computer via USB and the connection type is set to "Modem/COM", the phone acts like a USB serial peripheral, allowing Motorola Phone AT Commands to be sent. In this mode, sending "AT+MODE=8" will put the phone into a different state, in which it no longer accepts AT commands but its P2K05 functionality is accessible.

== RIZR/MOTO Z6c ==
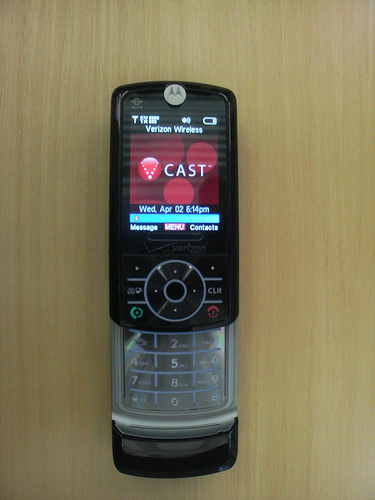
Motorola Moto Z6c

The Rizr Z6c, also known as the Moto Z6c, was introduced in December 2007 offered by Verizon Wireless. Designed to be a "world phone", it operates on both CDMA2000/EV-DO and GSM networks. It was along with the BlackBerry 8830 World Edition the only two phones offered by Verizon Wireless that will work outside of North America. Unlike the BlackBerry, the Z6c features no GSM data protocols, rendering it usable only as a cell phone with SMS capability whilst on the GSM network.

=== Z6cx ===
Motorola also manufactured a similar version to the Z6c for Verizon Wireless, known as the Z6cx, which omits the camera and is targeted at environments where camera phones are not allowed.
