= Siemens SL10 =

Mobile phone model by Siemens

The Siemens SL10 is a mobile phone with a four-color screen (red, green, blue, and white). It was the second mobile phone with a multicolor screen after the Siemens S10 as well as the first sliding (where the display slides up) mobile phone.
