= Motorola Rokr E1 =

Cell phone by Motorola and Apple

Motorola ROKR E1 MOTOROKR

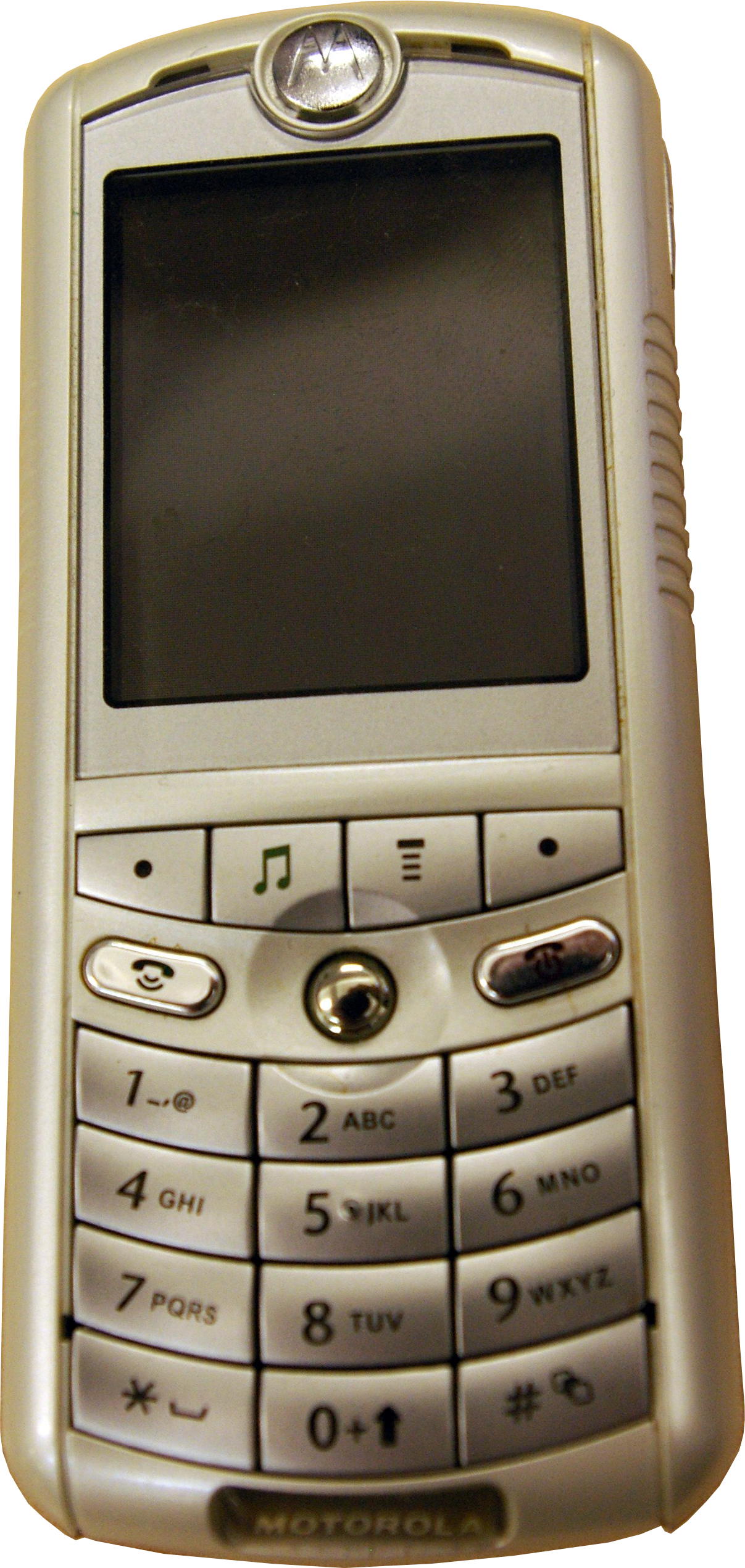
- Developer: Motorola
- Series: Rokr
- First released: Q3 2005
- Discontinued: c.2006
- Successor: Motorola Rokr E2
- Related: Motorola E398
- Compatible networks: GSM/GPRS
- Form factor: Bar
- Dimensions: 108×46×20.5 mm (4.25×1.81×0.81 in)
- Weight: 107 g (4 oz)
- Memory: microSD
- Rear camera: VGA
- Display: 176×220 pixels, 262,000 colors
- Connectivity: GPRS Class 10; Bluetooth
- Made in: China

The Motorola ROKR E1 (also marketed as the MotoRokr E1) is a candy-bar style cell phone by Motorola, announced on September 7, 2005. The phone was conceived in a collaboration between Motorola and Apple; the ROKR E1 was integrated and compatible with iTunes, for which it gained the nickname iTunes Phone. The phone features stereo speakers and an iTunes client music player built by Apple with an interface similar to that of the iPod.

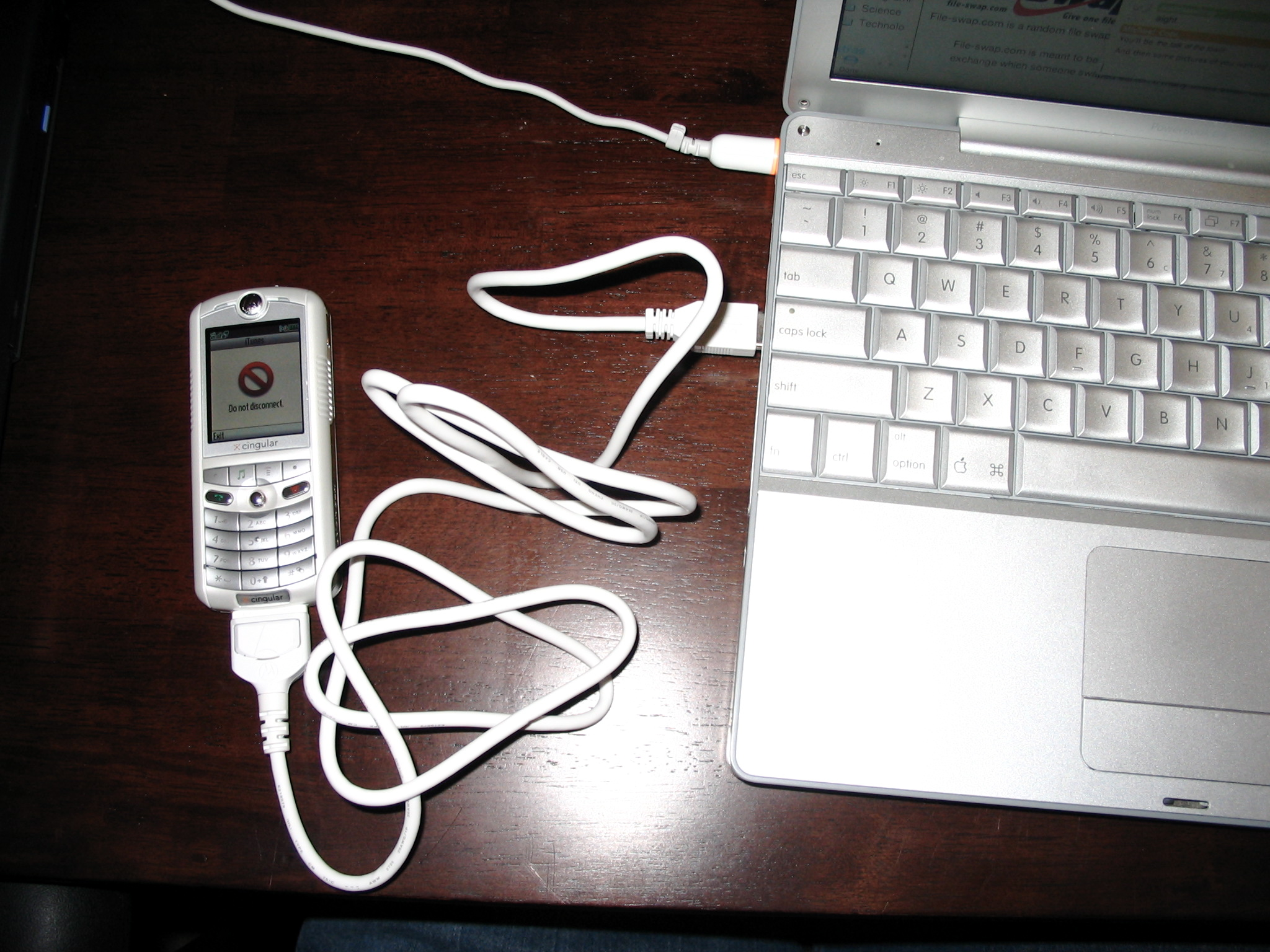
The Rokr connected to a PowerBook for syncing with iTunes

The Rokr E1 had been widely expected and rumored prior to its official launch, but it received a cold reception and is considered to have been a failure. This has been attributed to its cosmetic design, outdated hardware, and a 100-song limit. Despite this, Motorola made and released a successor without Apple's involvement, Motorola Rokr E2, while Apple eventually released its own iTunes-compatible cell phone, iPhone.

== History ==
The Motorola Rokr E1 is a re-badged Motorola E398 candybar style phone (it was originally called the E790) with Apple-licensed technology to play back iTunes Music Store purchased music. The E398 itself was released in August 2004. A partnership between the two companies had been long expected, with technology sites reporting on collaborations as far back as December 2004.

The ROKR was unveiled on September 7, 2005 at an Apple event in San Francisco. It was carried by operator Cingular in the US who sold it for $250 with a two year contract.

The Rokr's most high-profile rival was the Sony Ericsson W800, the first cell phone using the famous Walkman brand. The W800 had been released shortly before the announcement of the Rokr.

Less than two months after launch, Cingular reduced the price of the phone to $150 amid reports that it was not selling well.

== Reception ==
While the phone equipped an upgradeable 512 MB microSD memory card (Max. 1 GB), its firmware allowed only up to 100 songs to be loaded at any time. The limit hurt the ROKR's appeal. Many users also discovered that transferring music to the phone was slow compared to dedicated players, due to lack of support for Hi-Speed USB, and the E1 lacked wireless transfer. The Rokr was also criticized for being too much like the preceding E398. As a result, the Rokr E1 sold below expectations despite a high-profile marketing campaign. Some gave it the negative nickname 'the CROCKR'.

Because of the iPod Nano unveiling on the same day, relations between Motorola and Apple were strained and Motorola CEO Ed Zander later accused Apple of purposely undercutting the Rokr. Apple itself had been wary that the success of the Rokr would cannibalize sales of their own iPod.

== Legacy ==
Although the Rokr name would continue for several years in the form of Rokr E2, Rokr E8 and others, the brand continued having a bad reputation because of the E1, which was a disadvantage for Motorola against rival music-oriented phones like Sony Ericsson's 'W' (Walkman) series.

In addition to the Rokr E1, iTunes would also be integrated with certain models of Motorola's Razr V3i and Slvr L7.
