= Motorola Ming =

Line of smartphones

The Motorola Ming (Chinese: 明) is a series of smartphones from Motorola, sold in Hong Kong and mainland China only.

It is one of the series in the 4LTR line.

== A1200i ==
Motorola Ming (A1200i)
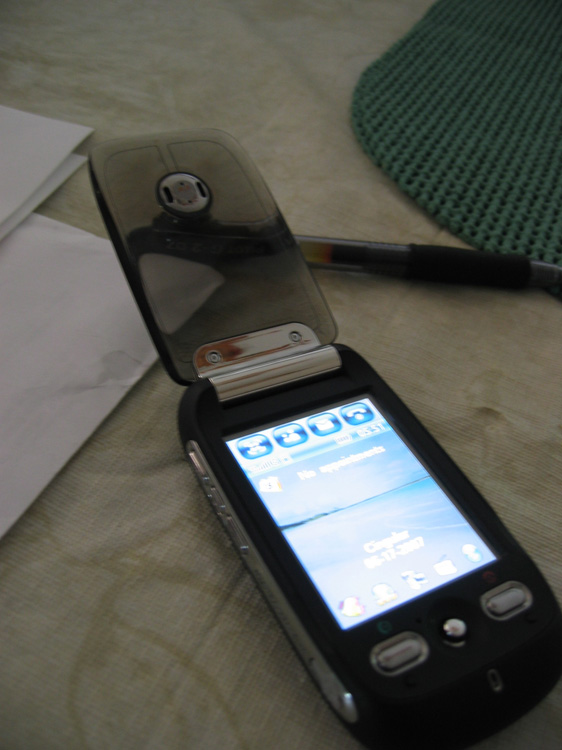
- Manufacturer: Motorola
- Type: Smartphone
- Series: MotoMing
- Availability by region: Hong Kong December 2005; 20 years ago
- Predecessor: Motorola A780
- Compatible networks: GSM Quad band with GPRS class 10, EDGE
- Form factor: Flip
- Dimensions: 95.7 mm (3.77 in) H 51.7 mm (2.04 in) W 21.5 mm (0.85 in) D
- Weight: 122 g (4.3 oz)
- Operating system: Linux-based, kernel 2.4.20
- Memory: 8 MB
- Removable storage: microSD up to 2 GB
- Battery: 850mAh, Internal Rechargeable Li-ion
- Rear camera: 2 MP, video recording, macro mode for fine shooting
- Display: 2.4 in (61 mm), 240x320 pixel, 262k colour TFT LCD touchscreen
- Connectivity: mini-USB, Bluetooth
- Data inputs: touchscreen

The A1200 came in December 2005. Although initially the A1200i was slightly towards the expensive side, with the advent of the ROKR E6 and other phones, the cost of the A1200i has been considerably reduced.

=== Technical specifications ===
- Application CPU: XScale PXA270 processor 315 MHz
- Baseband CPU: Freescale ARM CPU with a Motorola 56000 DSP handling radio traffic
- Talk time: 2–4 hrs
- Standby time: 14–48 hrs
- Browser: native Opera, WAP 2.0, WML, xHTML, HTML, JavaScript, simple Ajax
- Messaging: MMS, SMS
- E-mail: POP3, IMAP4, SMTP with SSL-encryption
- Applications: Java ME, M3G (JSR 184), MIDP 2.0; native applications supported with use of special packaging software
- Synchronization: SyncML, OTA
- Security: Voice Print, OMA DRM 1.0
- Music: MIDI (40), MP3, WAV, AMR, WMA, aacplus

Upgrading latest firmware, it supports the EDGE network. The latest version of Ming already supports EDGE.

=== Other features ===
- Integrated stereo FM tuner (use of wired headset required)
- Document viewer (PDF, Word, Excel, PowerPoint)
- High performance personal information manager
- Hands-free speaker phone with 40 channel polyphonic speaker
- Speaker independent voice dial
- Cursive handwriting recognition
- Bluetooth wireless technology with support for these profiles: HSP, HFP, GOEP, A2DP, AVRCP, BIP, BPP, and DUN

== A1200e ==
- Operating system: Motorola EZX Linux
- Browser: native Opera 8.00 for EZX
- User guide

== A1600 ==
Motorola Ming (A1600)
- Manufacturer: Motorola
- Type: Smartphone
- Series: MotoMing
- Availability by region: Hong Kong June 2008; 18 years ago
- Compatible networks: GSM Quad band with GPRS class 10, EDGE
- Form factor: Flip
- Dimensions: 98.5 mm (3.88 in) H 52.3 mm (2.06 in) W 18.38 mm (0.724 in) D
- Weight: 122 g (4.3 oz)
- Operating system: Linux-based, kernel 2.4.20
- Memory: 40 MB
- Removable storage: microSD up to 4 GB
- Rear camera: 3.2 MP with autofocus, scan ability, panorama, GIF animation for MMS
- Display: 2.4 in (61 mm), 240x320 pixel, 262k colour TFT LCD touchscreen
- Connectivity: mini-USB, Bluetooth
- Data inputs: touchscreen

The A1600 first appeared in June 2008.

=== Overview ===
MotoMing A1600, offers access to email, messaging and browsing in a user-friendly and stylish design. The full touchscreen simulates a traditional keypad, to give users a familiar experience, while a simplified user interface offers one-handed access to the most often used applications. Bluetooth 2.0 allows for simple pairing with enabled accessories, and enhances A1600's download speed and improving battery life.

=== Technical specifications ===
- Application CPU: Intel XScale PXA270 processor
- Talk time: 2–4 hrs
- Standby time: 14–48 hrs
- Browser: native Opera, WAP 2.0, WML, xHTML, HTML, JavaScript, simple Ajax
- Messaging: MMS, SMS
- E-mail: POP3, IMAP4, SMTP with SSL-encryption
- Applications: Java ME, M3G (JSR-184), MIDP 2.0
- Synchronization: SyncML, OTA
- Security: voice print, OMA DRM 1.0
- Music: MIDI (40), MP3, WAV, AMR, WMA, aacplus

=== Other features ===
- aGPS support for turn-by-turn navigation
- 3.2 MP with autofocus, scan ability, panorama, GIF animation for MMS
- Camera scanner with talking dictionary and business card reader
- Fuzzy Pinyin handwriting recognition
- Integrated stereo FM tuner (use of wired headset required)
- Document viewer (PDF, Word, Excel, PowerPoint)
- High performance personal information manager
- Hands-free speaker phone with 40 channel polyphonic speaker
- Speaker independent voice dial
- Cursive handwriting recognition
- Bluetooth wireless technology with support for these profiles: HSP, HFP, GOEP, A2DP, AVRCP, BIP, BPP, and DUN

== A1800 ==
Motorola Ming (A1800)
- Manufacturer: Motorola
- Type: Smartphone
- Series: MotoMing
- Availability by region: Hong Kong May 2009; 17 years ago
- Form factor: Flip
- Weight: 132 g (4.7 oz)
- Operating system: Linux
- Removable storage: microSD up to 4 GB
- Rear camera: 3.15 MP, autofocus
- Display: 2.4 in (61 mm), 240x320 pixel, 256k colour TFT LCD touchscreen
- Connectivity: micro-USB, Bluetooth

The 1800 came in May 2009, and featured a 3.15 MP camera.

== A1680 ==
Motorola Ming (A1680)
- Manufacturer: Motorola
- Type: Smartphone
- Series: MotoMing
- Availability by region: Hong Kong August 2010; 15 years ago
- Form factor: Flip
- Weight: 120 g (4.2 oz)
- Operating system: Android 1.6 Donut
- Removable storage: microSD up to 32 GB
- Rear camera: 5 MP, autofocus
- Display: 3.1 in (79 mm), 480x800 pixel, 16m colour touchscreen
- Connectivity: micro-USB, Bluetooth

The A1680 arrived in Q3 2010. It was given major improvements, including a better camera, a larger screen with better pixels, higher memory card limit and came installed with the Android 1.6 Donut operating system (OS).
