= Motorola ROKR =

Brand name of Motorola phones

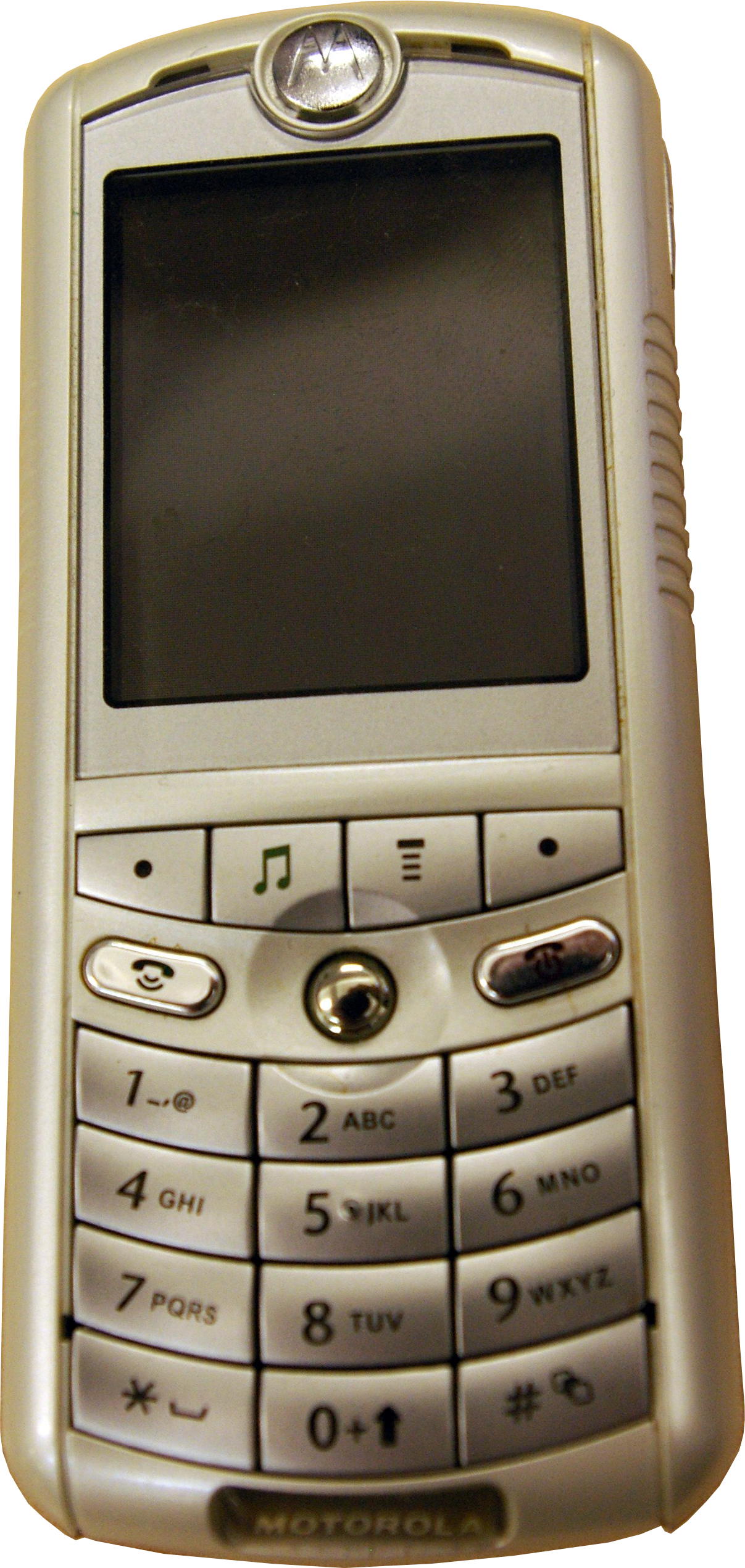

Motorola ROKR (/ˈrɒkər/) is a former series of music-oriented mobile phones from Motorola. A number of different models were released using the 'Rokr' name:

- Motorola Rokr E1, a candybar phone released in 2005 in collaboration with Apple
- Motorola Rokr E2, a candybar phone released in 2006
- Motorola Rokr E6, a touchscreen candybar phone released in 2006
- Motorola Z6, a slider phone released in 2007 under either the Rokr or Rizr names
- Motorola Rokr E8, a candybar phone released in 2008
- Motorola Rokr EM30, a lower-grade version of the Rokr E8 released in 2008
- Motorola Rokr W5, a flip phone released in 2007/2008 near-identical to the Motorola W510
- Motorola EM35, a slider phone released in 2008 also under the Rokr name
- Motorola EM25/EM325, a slider phone released in 2008 also under the Rokr name
- Motorola W6, a sports-oriented flip phone released in 2009 also under the Rokr name
- Motorola EM28/EM330, a flip phone released in 2009 also under the Rokr name
- Motorola Rokr ZN50, a touchscreen slider phone released in 2009 for the South Korean market
