= Motorola Rokr E8 =

Cell phone released in 2008

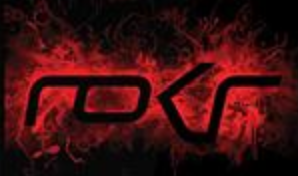

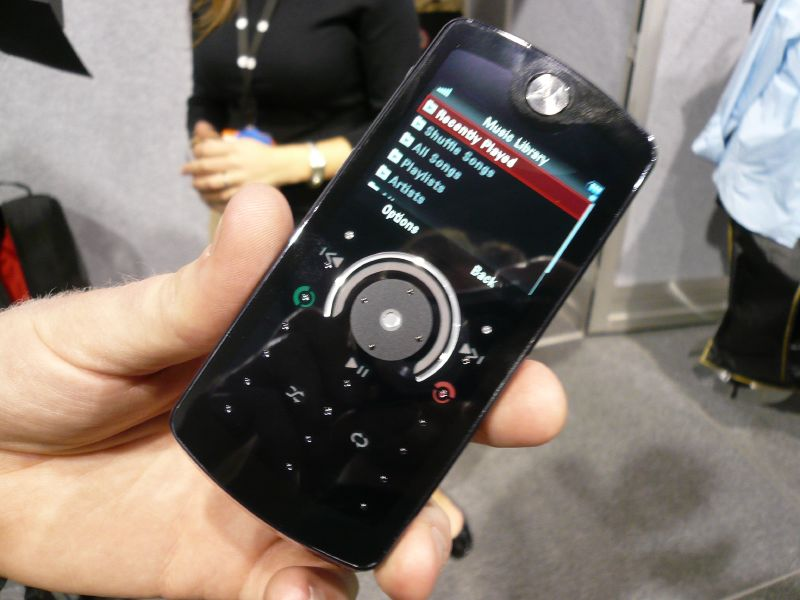
- Manufacturer: Motorola
- Availability by region: July 2008
- Predecessor: Motorola Z6
- Related: Motorola Zine ZN5; Motorola Rokr EM30
- Compatible networks: GSM/GPRS/EDGE
- Dimensions: 115×53×10.6 mm (4.53×2.09×0.42 in)
- Weight: 100 g (4 oz)
- CPU: 500MHz CPU with Freescale SCM-A11 baseband processor
- Storage: 2 GB internal memory
- Removable storage: MicroSD
- Battery: Li-ion 970 mAh
- Rear camera: 2 megapixel, 8× zoom
- Display: Type: TFT; Colors: 250K; Size: 320 × 240 pixels (2 inches)
- Connectivity: mini-USB, 3.5 mm headphone jack, Bluetooth Class 2

The Motorola Rokr E8 (stylized ROKR E8), also marketed as MotoRokr E8, is a candy-bar style GSM mobile cell phone designed and developed by Motorola, released in July 2008 and part of the ROKR designated phones focused on music playing. It runs on MotoMagx Linux.

Its most unique feature is its backlit and dynamic touch-sensitive keypad. The virtual buttons on the keypad change depending on the current function of the device. This feature was referred to as ModeShift. The touch feedback system also has haptic technology. The ModeShift technology used on the Rokr E8 was also used on the similar Rokr EM30 as well as the Motorola Zine ZN5 and the Motorola Stature i9 iDEN phone.

The Rokr E8 also features a four-way music controller and menu navigator wheel that Motorola called the Omega Wheel and FastScroll, as well as a 3.5 mm headphone jack.

The Motorola Rokr E8 was announced at the 2008 Consumer Electronics Show, where it won CNET's Best of CES award. However, the omission of 3G connectivity (it only works on EDGE speeds at best) was considered unexpected and a source for criticism. The Motorola Rokr E8 also features Bluetooth, a full HTML web browser, a 2.0-megapixel camera, and a microSD card slot that can expand the existing 2 GB of internal embedded memory.

== Release and carriers ==
In the US, T-Mobile and Cellular One carried the Motorola Rokr E8 whereas in Canada Rogers Wireless did so, released on August 12, 2008.

== Related phones ==
The Motorola Rokr EM30 is a cut-down version of the Rokr E8 released later in 2008. It runs on LiMo, a Linux-based operating system for mobile devices.

== In popular culture ==
Before it was made official, the Motorola Rokr E8 appeared in the music video for "Clumsy" by Fergie.

== See also ==
- Motorola Rizr Z10
- Motorola Zine ZN5
