= Motorola A780 =

Motorola device

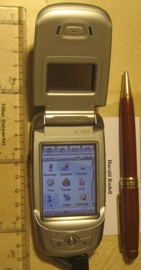
- Motorola A780 opened
- Manufacturer: Motorola
- Availability by region: Q4 2004
- Successor: Motorola A1200
- Compatible networks: GSM Quad-band (850/900/1800/1900)
- Dimensions: 106×53×24 mm (4.17×2.09×0.94 in), 106 cc
- Weight: 141 g (5 oz)
- Operating system: MontaVista Linux OS (not MOTOMAGX)
- CPU: 312 MHz processor
- Memory: 48MB RAM
- Removable storage: SD/MMC expandable to 2 GB
- Battery: Li-ion 780 mAh
- Rear camera: 1.3 megapixels 1280 x 1024 pixels, with full-screen viewfinder
- Display: 2.5-inch 240 x 320 pixels, TFT with 65k colors
- Connectivity: GPRS Class 10, Enhanced Mini USB, BCM2035 Bluetooth 1.1 (+A2DP)
- Data inputs: Touch-Screen with Stylus

The Motorola A780 is the second cellular PDA running a Linux-based operating system.

It was introduced in 2003 and sold in Europe and Asia. Some models include GPS and navigation software.

== Design ==
The Motorola A780 is a Linux-based smartphone. When the lid is closed, the phone appears like a traditional phone, with a keypad matrix and small display, actually a window to the larger display below the lid. When the lid is flipped open, a QVGA touch screen is revealed that can be used with fingers or a supplied stylus.

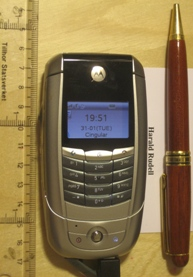
A780 with closed flip

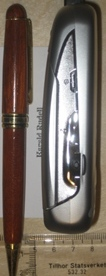
Side view

== Features ==
The phone is supplied with a number of applications including a POP and IMAP email client, Opera web browser, calendar and a viewer for PDF and Microsoft Office files. The calendar and address book can be synchronized with a Microsoft Exchange or SyncML server. The phone has a 1.3 megapixel camera recording still and video images. RealPlayer is included to play sound audio files and streamed audio and video. The phone has 48 megabytes of internal flash memory for storing user data and a slot for a microSD card. Both Bluetooth and USB are provided for communication with another computer. Character entry is via an on-screen QWERTY keyboard and hand writing recognition. Models including a GPS receiver are supplied with ALK Technologies' CoPilot Live navigation software with street level maps of Europe.

== Technical details ==
The phone has three processors:

- Baseband Processor (BP) is an ARM7TDMI that is used for basic GSM phone functions. The necessary digital signal processing is performed by an Onyx (566xx) DSP core. The BP runs the Nucleus operating system (produced by Mentor Graphics) from its own 32 MBit Flash memory.
- Application Processor (AP) is an Intel PXA270 with an ARMv5TE ARM core. This runs Linux, the user interface Qtopia and the application programs.
- Models with GPS use a Motorola MG4100 single chip GPS receiver integrated circuit.

The Linux operating system used, EZX Linux, is a modified version of MontaVista Consumer Electronics Linux 3.0

== Linux enthusiasts ==
This phone is popular with Linux enthusiasts. It is able to establish a TCP/IP connection between the phone and another computer over USB or Bluetooth. One can then telnet to the phone and be presented with a bash prompt. From the prompt one can, for example, mount an NFS drive(s) on the phone. The underlying operating system, Motorola EZX is Linux based, its kernel is open source. With the source code hosted on opensource.motorola.com, it is possible to recompile and replace the kernel for this operating system. However Motorola did not publish a software development kit for native applications. Instead, they are expecting third party programs to be written in Java ME. The OpenEZX website is dedicated to providing free opensource software for this phone and others using the same OS.

== See also ==
- Motorola
- List of Motorola products
- List of mobile phones running Linux
- OpenEZX
