= Motorola Slvr =

Cell phone by Motorola

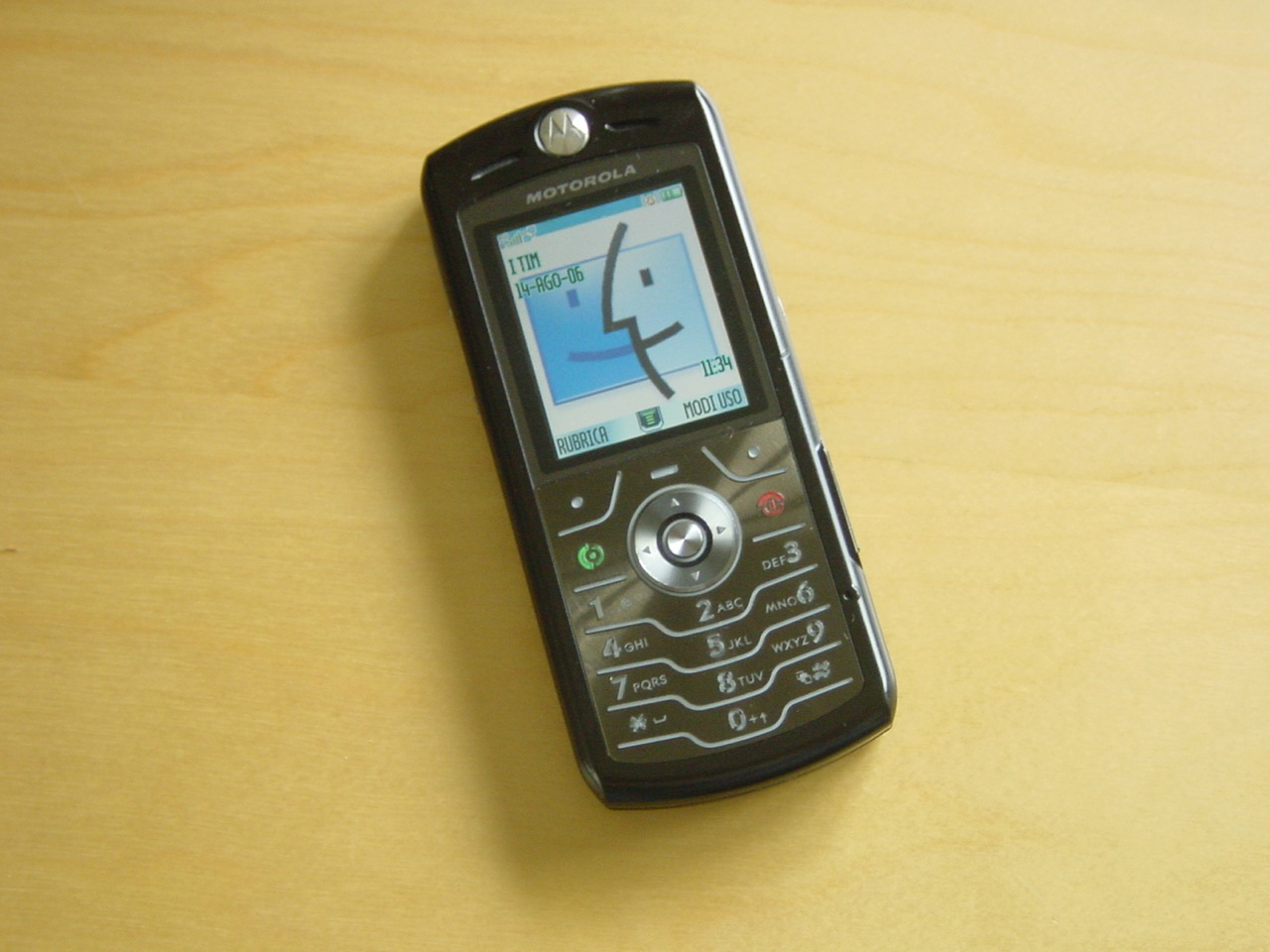
- Motorola Slvr L7
- First released: Q1 2005
- Related: Motorola Razr V3; Motorola Rokr E1
- Compatible networks: GSM 850/900/1800/1900 (quad band), GPRS; CDMA 850/1900, 1xEVDO
- Form factor: Candybar
- Dimensions: 1.9 x 4.5 x .45 in. / 113 x 49 x 11.5 mm
- Weight: 3.38 oz (96 g)
- Memory: 11 MB Internal and External microSD cards expandable up to 1 GB.
- Rear camera: VGA resolution (640x480) still photos or QCIF resolution (176x144) video
- Display: 176×220 pixel (1.9") 262,144 color TFT LCD
- Connectivity: mini-USB, Bluetooth

The Motorola Slvr L7 (styled SLVR L7), also marketed as MOTOSLVR, is a candybar style mobile phone made by Motorola for GSM networks. It was announced at the 3GSM fair on February 14, 2005 originally under the name SLVR V8. Inspired by the Motorola Razr V3, the Slvr shares the same flat keypad and was designed to be thin and compact: it was just 11.5 mm (0.45 in) thick which was considered very thin at the time.

Two main updated versions were also made: the Slvr L7e announced in October 2006 adds EDGE data, upgrades the camera to 1.3-megapixels, and upgrades Bluetooth capabilities. This was followed by a successor Slvr L9 (known as Slvr L72 in Asia) announced in February 2007 with a redesigned plastic keypad, upgrading the camera to 2.0-megapixels and adding an FM radio.

In addition, Motorola also released two cheaper handsets without the SLVR designation: the Motorola L6 has a downgraded 65k color display with lower resolution, lacks the microSD slot present on the Slvr L7, and has a different, curved keypad. A variant of this model, Motorola L6i, has an additional FM radio. Motorola L2 is a model that removes the music player and entirely lacks a camera, while also having a raised keypad. This model was marketed specifically to corporate and government markets which generally prohibit their employees from using phone cameras. Both these models were announced on March 11, 2005 under the names SLVRcam V280 and SLVRlite V270 respectively.

== Features ==
The L7 was originally announced as Motorola SLVR V8 in February 2005, before being renamed to SLVR L7. It is known for its dedicated web browser and web video downloader which critics have said is the main feature of the Slvr.

It is one of a few non-Apple branded phones released featuring iTunes support, allowing the user to play up to 100 downloaded songs that are stored on the phone's removable microSD card. This feature only appears on units sold in the US: international Slvr L7 phones use Motorola's own music playing software and are not compatible with iTunes.

The Slvr L7 also features Bluetooth connectivity, a digital camera with 4x digital zoom and has a speakerphone.

Carried in the United States by Cingular Wireless, Metro PCS, and Cricket Communications, and carried in Canada by Rogers Wireless, it superseded the earlier Motorola Rokr E1, which was withdrawn from the market due to lackluster sales.

== Variants ==
The Motorola Slvr L7e is a refreshed version finished in blue color that features a 1.3 megapixel camera, EDGE and some internal hardware changes as well as updated software, similar to Motorola Rizr Z3. This model was not sold in the US.

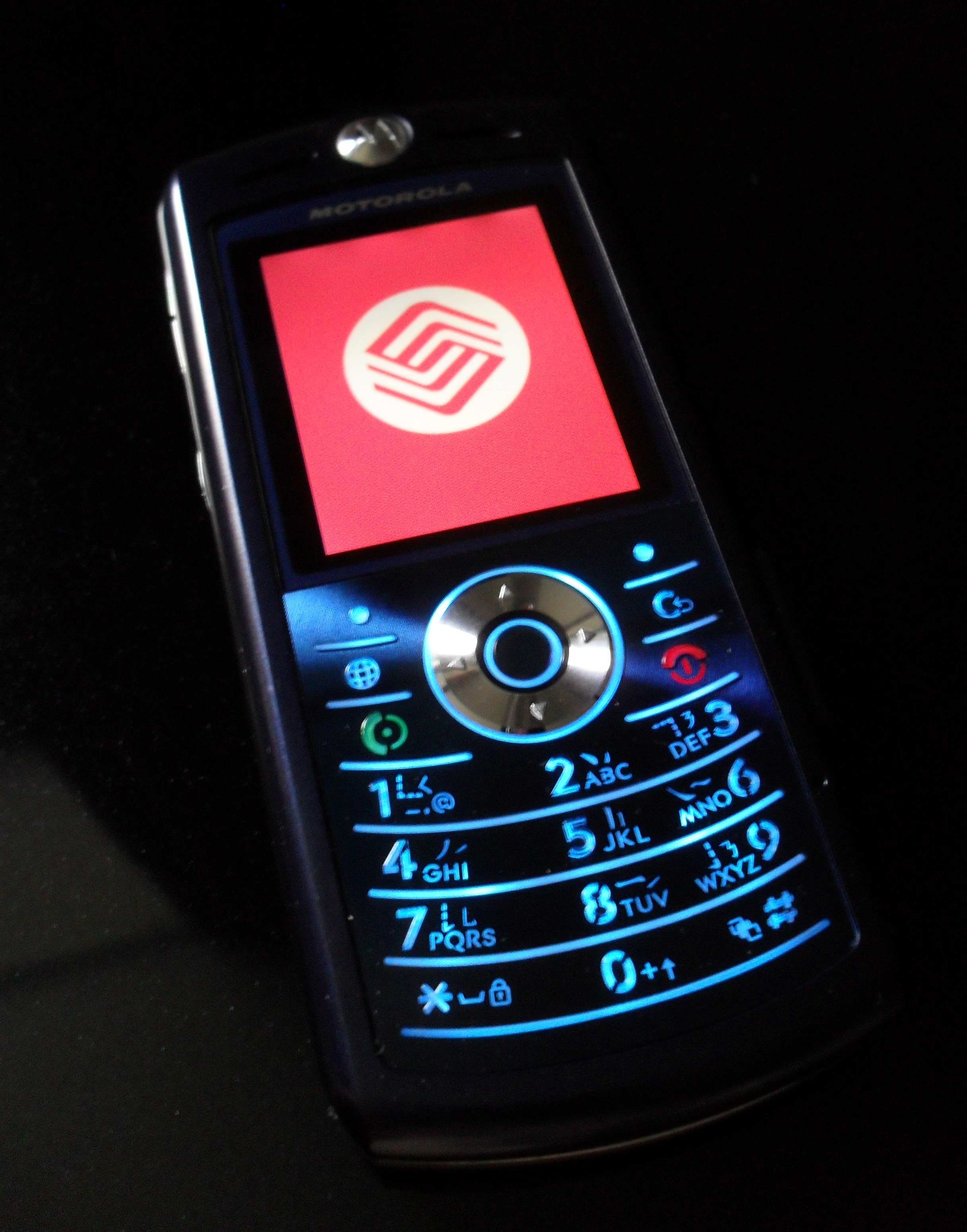
Motorola L71 (Chinese Motorola L7e) on the China Mobile network

Motorola Slvr L71 is the name of the L7e model sold in China by China Mobile.

Slvr L7i is another variant. An i-mode version of the Slvr L7 was also released in 2006.

Partnering with Motorola, various British networks released a special Product Red Slvr and Bluetooth H3 headset to help support Global Fund programs which aim to positively impact the lives of women and children affected by HIV/AIDS in Africa.

=== L7c (CDMA) ===
Similar to the original Slvr, this CDMA version offers a Sprint or Motorola music player which can hold as many songs as the size of the memory card in the phone. It also features EV-DO high speed data. The phone was offered in the US by Sprint (in red only), Claro, U.S. Cellular, MetroPCS, Cricket Communications, and a silver version for Verizon Wireless. The Verizon version, as with other phones from this carrier, prevent the sending of audio files via Bluetooth, although ringtones can be transferred using the BitPim software. The Slvr L7c was also offered in Venezuela by Movilnet.

While Sprint's Music Store/Player ("powered by Groove Mobile") will list all songs on the SD card, it fails to play any that reside above the first 1 GB of space on the card, producing "Error M506". It also fails to play random tracks if some tracks have a long pathname (directory name length plus file name length), where "long" is approximately over 32 characters.

== Criticisms ==
When the battery is low, the Slvr emits a frequent loud beep, which is inconvenient in many settings. The beeping can be disabled by putting the phone in the silent or vibrate modes, or switching the phone off. The beeping stops when the battery is recharging.

== Use by NSA ==
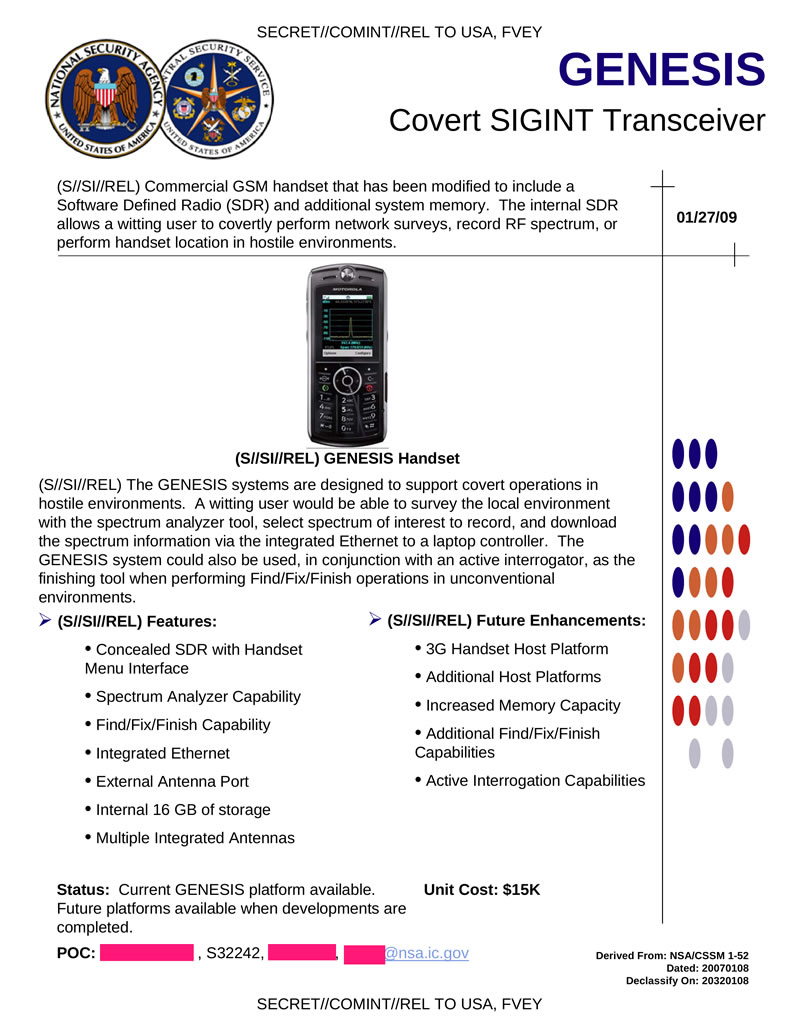
NSA

The SLVR is featured in the NSA ANT catalog as a variant costing $15,000 and containing a software-defined radio for covert surveillance.

== Gallery ==
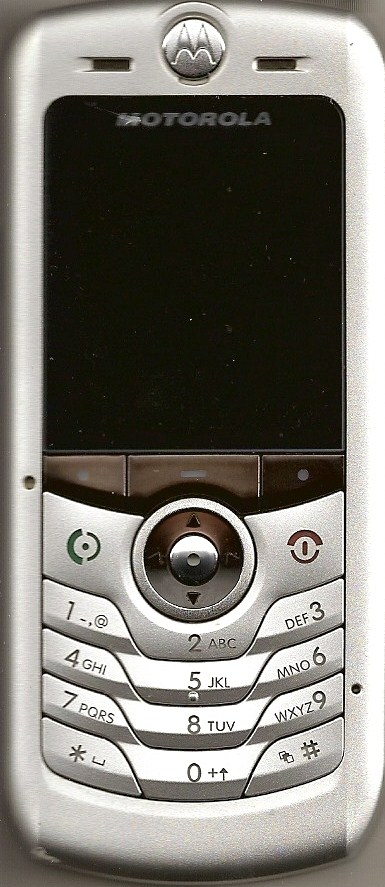
Motorola L2

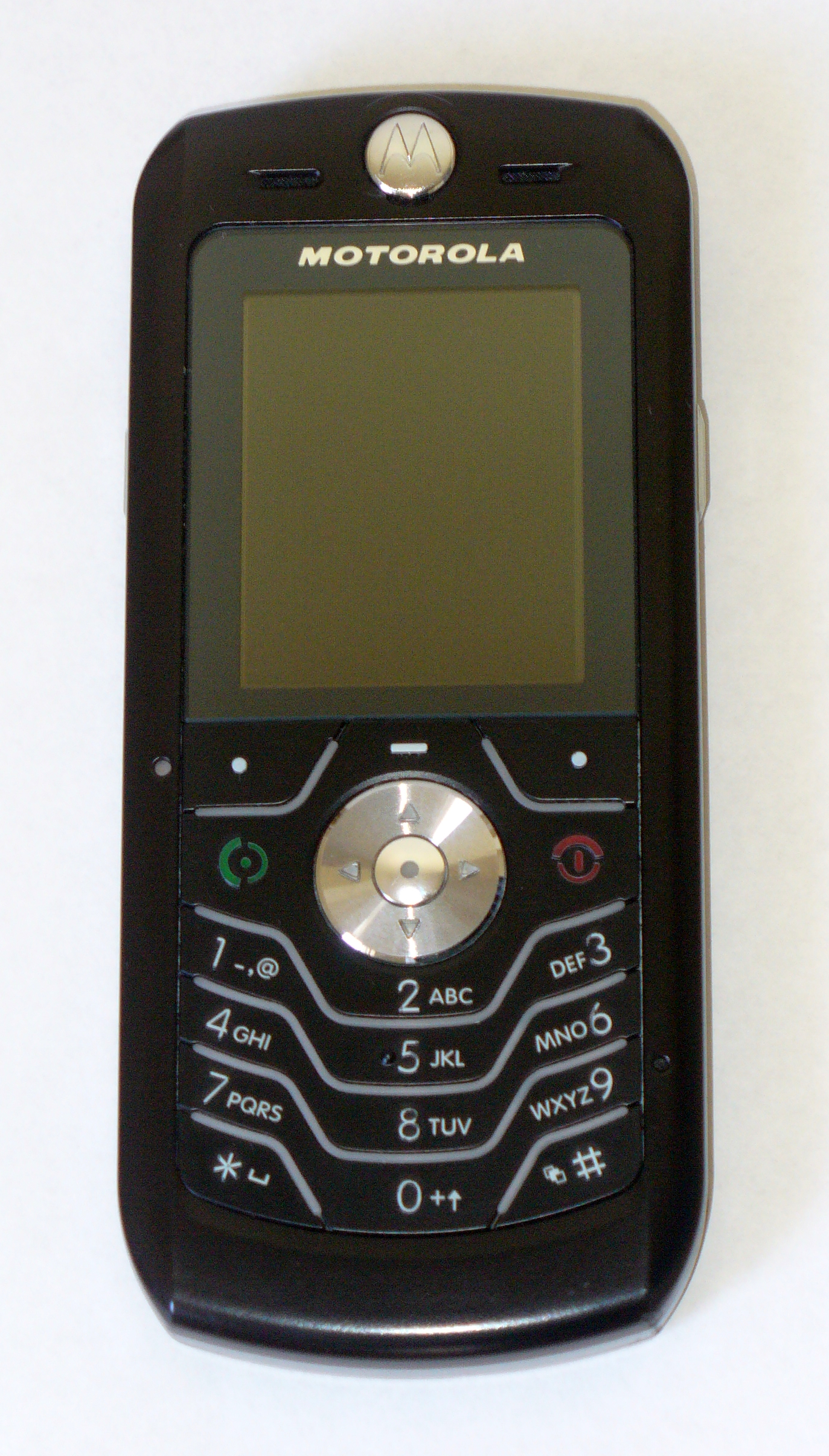
Motorola L6 in black

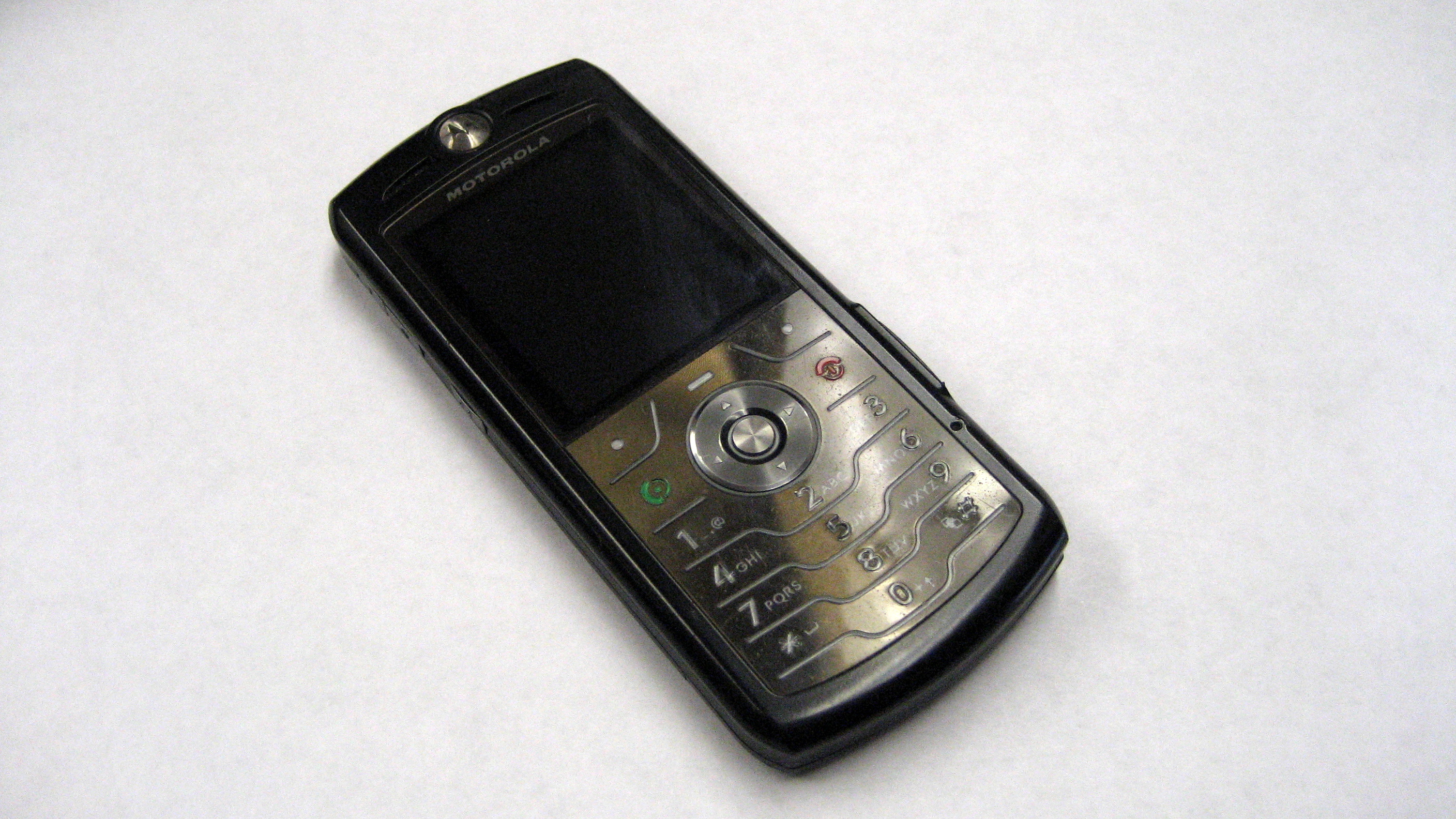
Motorola SLVR L7

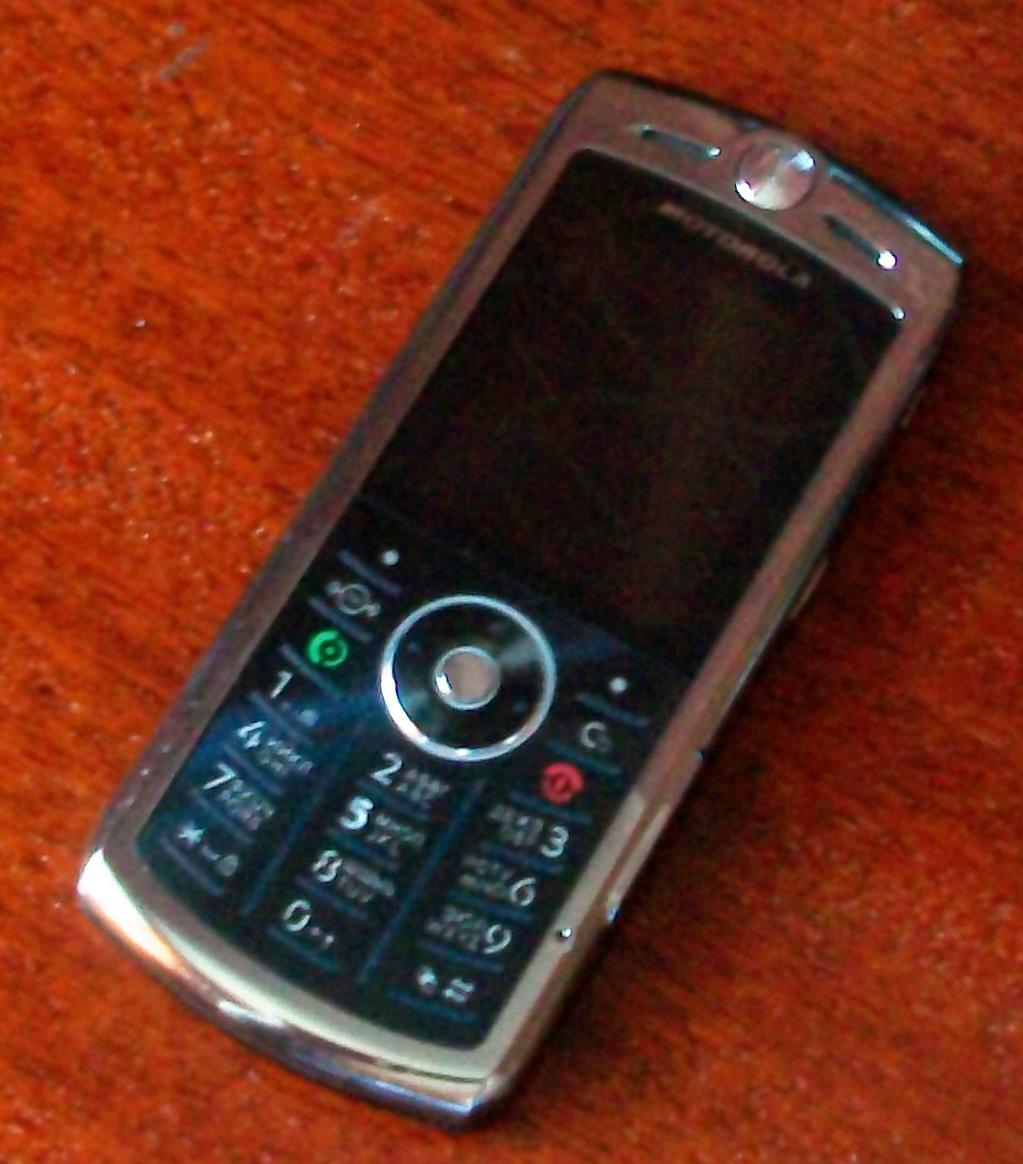
Motorola SLVR L9

== See also ==
- Samsung Ultra Edition
