= Slider (mobile phones) =

Type of form factor in phones and other devices

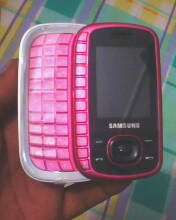
Samsung GT-B3310, an example of a 'side slider' mobile phone

Slider is a general term of a form factor in mobile phones composed of usually two, but sometimes more, sections that slide past each other on rails. Most slider phones have a display segment which houses the device's screen, while another segment contains the keypad or keyboard and slides out for use. The goal of a sliding form factor is to allow the operator to take advantage of full physical keyboards or keypads, without sacrificing portability, by retracting them into the phone when they are not in use.

Sliders supplanted the flip form, since they allowed manufacturers to pack more keypad buttons and features (especially the side slider or QWERTY slider) into the same form factor, while touchscreen interfaces were still in their infancy. By the late-2000s, "slider" designs reached the peak of their popularity and declined afterward, being completely replaced by slate form factors with well-developed touch interfaces. Sliders briefly reappeared with designs like Xiaomi Mi MIX 3.

Sliders have also been used in non-phone devices, for example on the Mylo.

== Types ==
=== Keypad sliders ===
Graphic of a typical keypad sliding mobile phone

The Siemens SL10 was likely the first "conventional" slider cell phone (i.e. a variation of the candybar where the display part slides up to reveal a keypad), released in 1999. The Nokia 7650 and Siemens SL55 were some other early slider phones, but the form factor remained uncommon until 2004 when it became trendy. The Samsung D500 was one of the first popular sliding mobile phones. Some phones have an automatic slider built in that deploys the keypad. Many phones pop out their keypad segments as soon as the user begins to slide the phone apart.

=== QWERTY sliders ===
The side slider or QWERTY slider uses vertical access of the keyboard on the bottom segment. The side slider form factor is primarily used to facilitate faster access to the keyboard with both thumbs. These became trendy during the late 2000s, offering a landscape user interface as well as full keyboard, ideal for texting. This sort of handheld keyboard was pioneered on the (non-slider) T-Mobile Sidekick/Danger Hiptop and appeared in slider form on the HTC TyTN, but by 2008 and 2009 had become commonplace on many smartphones and feature phones, examples being Nokia N97, T-Mobile G1, Sony Ericsson Xperia X1, Motorola Droid, Nokia E75, LG GW520, LG Prada II and Samsung CorbyPRO/Genio Slide. Some models, such as the already-mentioned N97 as well as the Nokia E7 released in 2011 and the F(x)tec Pro 1 released in 2019, not only bring out the keyboard from the side but also tilt the display so that they resemble a laptop.

Portrait sliders with QWERTY keyboards were also around, as seen for instance on the Palm Pre, BlackBerry Torch 9800 and Samsung SGH-i620, but these were otherwise rare as opposed to the 'side' ones. In 2015, BlackBerry Limited released the BlackBerry Priv, the first mainstream slider phone in several years.

=== Unconventional types of sliders ===
Unique models are the 2-way slider where sliding up or down provides distinct functions, pioneered by and most notably on the Nokia N95. Another variation of the keypad sliding design is the kick-slider, a slider with an extra hinge to conform to face like on the Motorola Rizr Z8.

The earliest examples of sliding phones were those that slide down to reveal the keypad, seen in the "banana"-like Nokia 8110 released in 1996. This design also appeared on Alcatel's OT Club and OT View not long afterwards.

Some unusual sliders have also been made, such as the Nokia 7280 modeled like lipstick, Samsung SGH-F520 from 2007 which slides three ways with a QWERTY keyboard, and the Samsung's Anycall SCH-B550; which is a gaming phone.

Today, manufacturers are trying to develop bezel-less smartphones; the greatest difficulty being the presence of front-facing cameras and face recognition sensors. While most brands expand display real-estate, some depart from that approach, returning to a lesser form of the slider form factor; like the Xiaomi Mi Mix 3, Huawei Honor Magic 2 and Lenovo Z5 Pro.

== See also ==
- Form factor (mobile phones)
