= Motorola Rokr E2 =

Cell phone released in 2006

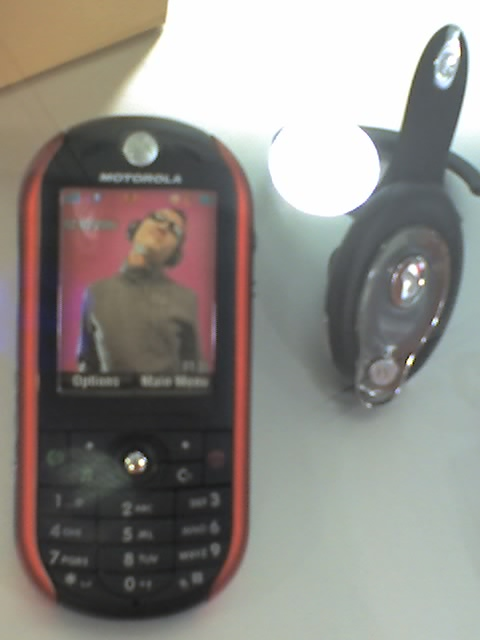
- First released: June 2006
- Predecessor: Motorola Rokr E1
- Successor: Motorola Rokr E6
- Compatible networks: GSM 900/1800/1900 with GPRS Class 10 (2U/4D)
- Dimensions: 106×49.5×18 mm (4.17×1.95×0.71 in)
- Weight: 115 g (4 oz)
- Operating system: Linux
- CPU: Intel XScale PXA270
- Storage: 11 MB
- Removable storage: SD expansion card slot for up to 2 GB (or 4 GB, if flashed with modded firmware)
- Rear camera: 1.3-megapixel, video at 15 fps for 2 hours maximum
- Display: 30 × 40 mm TFT LCD, 240×320 pixels, 262K colours
- Connectivity: Bluetooth 2.0 + EDR (supports A2DP); USB 2.0 by mini-USB

The Motorola Rokr E2 (stylized Motorola ROKR E2), also marketed as MotoRokr E2, is a cell phone developed by Motorola, introduced at the Consumer Electronic Show of January 2006. The first public release occurred on June 22, 2006, in China. It is a new design and effectively succeeded the Motorola Rokr E1, not featuring iTunes compatibility, instead the Rokr E2 runs a Linux feature phone operating system.

It has several enhancements over the much criticised Rokr E1, such as the addition of music controls (on the left hand side of the device), high speed USB 2.0 for faster syncing, and no forced limit to the number of song tracks. In addition, it has a built in 3.5 mm headphone jack (without requiring an adapter), adds the A2DP Bluetooth profile for use with wireless headphones, and improved display and camera. The Motorola Rokr E2 also added a stereo FM radio.

== Features and software ==
The Rokr E2 can play back file formats: MP3, AMR, MID, MIDI, SMF, MMF, XMF, IMY, WAV, RA, WMA, AAC, AWB, MPGA, M4A, 3GA, RM, RMVB, 3GP, MP4 by RealPlayer.

Using a new feature called iRadio, FM radio programs can be downloaded onto the phone through Internet.

The Motorola Rokr E2 runs EZX, a Linux operating system that previously shipped with the Motorola A780 PDA, and a user interface called Chameleon UI. As it is a Linux phone, the open source community developed numerous modifications to the phone's software, such as quad band, EDGE, and support for a 4 GB SD card. Some have overclocked the processor.

The phone software also comes with Opera 8.50 web browser and e-mail support.

== Availability ==
Motorola Rokr E2 was released in China and other territories in Asia and in South America, but unlike the Rokr E1 was not released in North America.

== See also ==
- Motorola Rokr E6
- Motorola Rokr E8
