= Motorola Rizr =

Series of cell phone models

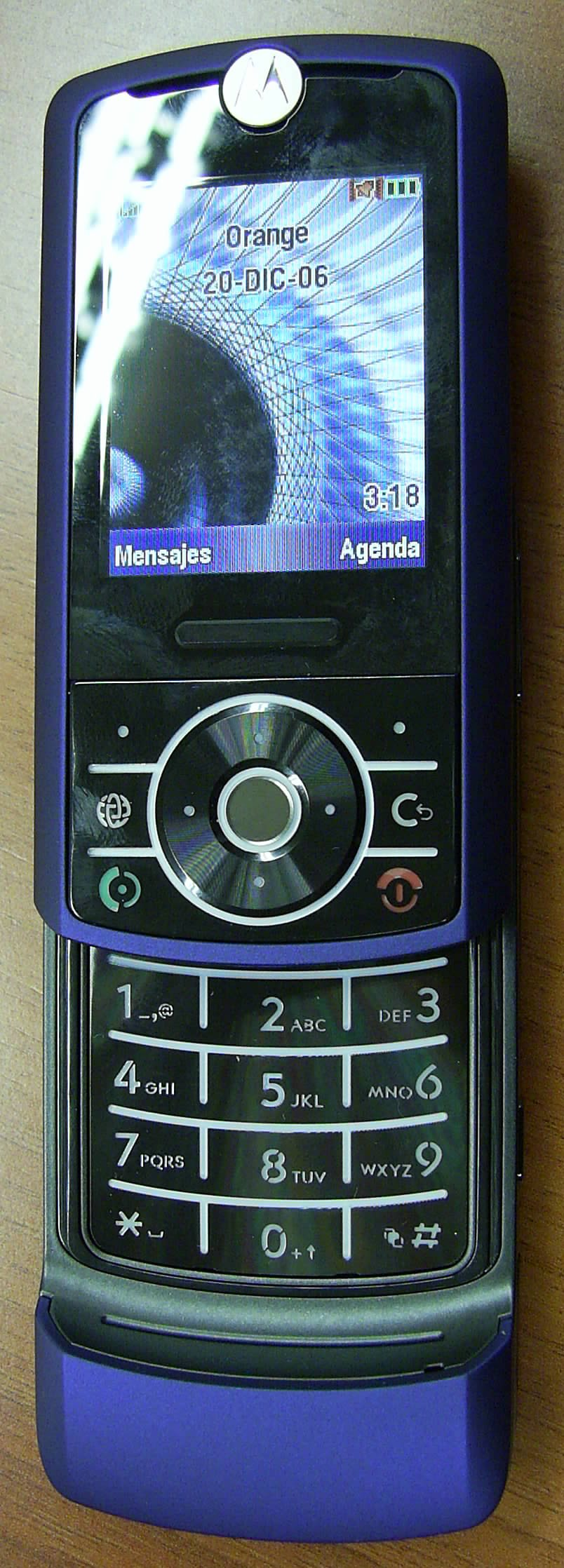

Motorola Rizr (/ˈraɪzər/, styled RIZR), also marketed as MOTORIZR, is a former series of slide mobile phones from Motorola. Models include:

- Motorola Rizr Z3, original Rizr released in 2006
- Motorola Rizr Z6 (also known as Rokr Z6), 2007 model running MotoMagx or BREW
- Motorola Rizr Z8, 2007 model running Symbian UIQ
- Motorola Rizr Z10, 2008 model running Symbian UIQ
