= Comparison of Google Nexus tablets =

The following is a comparative list of tablet computers belonging to the Google Nexus line of devices, using the Android operating system.

Model	Nexus 7				Nexus 10	Nexus 9	
Model	2012 version		2013 version		Nexus 10	Nexus 9	
Model	Wi-Fi	Wi-Fi, cellular	Wi-Fi	Wi-Fi, cellular	Nexus 10	Wi-Fi	Wi-Fi, cellular
Manufacturer	Asus				Samsung Electronics	HTC	
Status	Out of support						
Released	July 2012	November 2012	July 2013	September 2013	November 2012	November 2014	December 2014
Discontinued	October 8, 2012 (8 GB version); July 24, 2013	July 24, 2013	April 25, 2015	April 25, 2015	October 17, 2014	NA	
Image							
Android version	4.1 Jelly Bean		4.3 Jelly Bean		4.2 Jelly Bean	5.0 Lollipop	
Upgradeable to	5.1 Lollipop		6.0 Marshmallow		5.1 Lollipop	7.1.2 Nougat	
Last update date	March 2015		August 2016		March 2015	January 2017	
Cellular frequencies	NA	GSM 850/900/1800/1900 MHz; UMTS 850/900/1700/1900/2100 MHz	NA	GSM 850/900/1800/1900 MHz; UMTS 850/900/1900/1700/2100 MHz; LTE 700/750/850/1700/1800/1900/2100 MHz (US version); 800/850/1700/1800/1900/2100/2600 MHz (International version)	NA	NA	Quad-band GSM, CDMA, Penta-band HSPA, 4G LTE
Data speeds	NA	HSPA+	NA	HSPA+	NA	NA	4G LTE
Size	198.5 mm (7.81 in) H 120 mm (4.7 in) W 10.5 mm (0.41 in) D		200 mm (7.9 in) H 114 mm (4.5 in) W 8.65 mm (0.341 in) D		263.9 mm (10.39 in) H 177.6 mm (6.99 in) W 8.9 mm (0.35 in) D	228.25 mm (8.986 in) H 153.68 mm (6.050 in) W 7.95 mm (0.313 in) D	
Weight	340 g (12 oz)	347 g (12.2 oz)	290 g (10 oz)	299 g (10.5 oz)	603 g (21.3 oz)	425 g (15.0 oz)	436 g (15.4 oz)
Chipset	Nvidia Tegra 3 T30L		Qualcomm Snapdragon S4 Pro (APQ8064)		Samsung Exynos 5250	TBA	
Processor	1.2 GHz ARM Cortex-A9MP4 (quad-core)		1.5 GHz quad-core Krait		1.7 GHz ARM Cortex-A15MP2 (dual-core)	NVIDIA Tegra K1 "Denver"	
Graphics	Nvidia ULP GeForce @ 416 MHz		Adreno 320 @ 400 MHz		Mali-T604	Kepler GPU	
Memory	1 GB		2 GB			2 GB	
Storage	8, 16 or 32 GB	16 or 32 GB	16 or 32 GB	32 GB	16 or 32 GB	16 or 32 GB	32 GB
Expandable memory	NA						
Power	4,325 mAh; Rechargeable lithium-ion polymer battery		3,950 mAh; Rechargeable lithium-ion polymer battery		9,000 mAh; Rechargeable lithium polymer battery	6,700 mAh; Rechargeable lithium-ion polymer battery	
Display	7 in (180 mm) LED-backlit IPS LCD capacitive touchscreen 1280 x 800 pixels (216 ppi); 16:10 aspect ratio		7.02 in (178 mm) LED-backlit IPS LCD capacitive touchscreen 1920 x 1200 pixels (323 ppi); 16:10 aspect ratio		10.1 in (260 mm) Super PLS capacitive touchscreen 2560 x 1600 pixels (300 ppi); 16:10 aspect ratio	8.9 in (230 mm) LED-backlit IPS LCD capacitive touchscreen 2048 x 1536 pixels (287 ppi); 4:3 aspect ratio	
Rear camera	NA		5 MP; 1080p video recording		5 MP (2,592×1,936) with LED flash 1080p video recording @ 30 FPS	8 MP; LED flash	
Front camera	1.2 MP, 720p video recording @ 30 FPS				1.9 MP, 720p video recording @ 30 FPS	1.6 MP	
Media formats	Audio MP3, WAV, eAAC+, WMA; Video H.263, H.264, MP4					NA	
Connectivity	3.5 mm headphone jack Bluetooth 3.0; Wi-Fi (802.11 b/g/n @ 2.4 GHz); NFC; Micro USB 2.0; Docking pins		3.5 mm headphone jack Bluetooth 4.0; Wi-Fi dual-band (802.11 a/b/g/n @ 2.4 GHz & 5 GHz); NFC; Micro USB 2.0; Qi wireless charging SlimPort		3.5 mm headphone jack Bluetooth 3.0; Wi-Fi (802.11 b/g/n @ 5,0 GHz; MIMO + HT40); Dual-side NFC; Micro-HDMI; Micro USB 2.0; Docking pins	3.5 mm headphone jack Bluetooth 4.1; Wi-Fi dual-band (802.11 a/b/g/n/ac @ 2.4 GHz & 5 GHz; 2x2 (MIMO)); NFC; Micro USB 2.0	
References							

== See also ==
- Comparison of Google Nexus smartphones
- List of Google Play edition devices
