= Nexus 7 (2013) =

2013 Android mini tablet computer

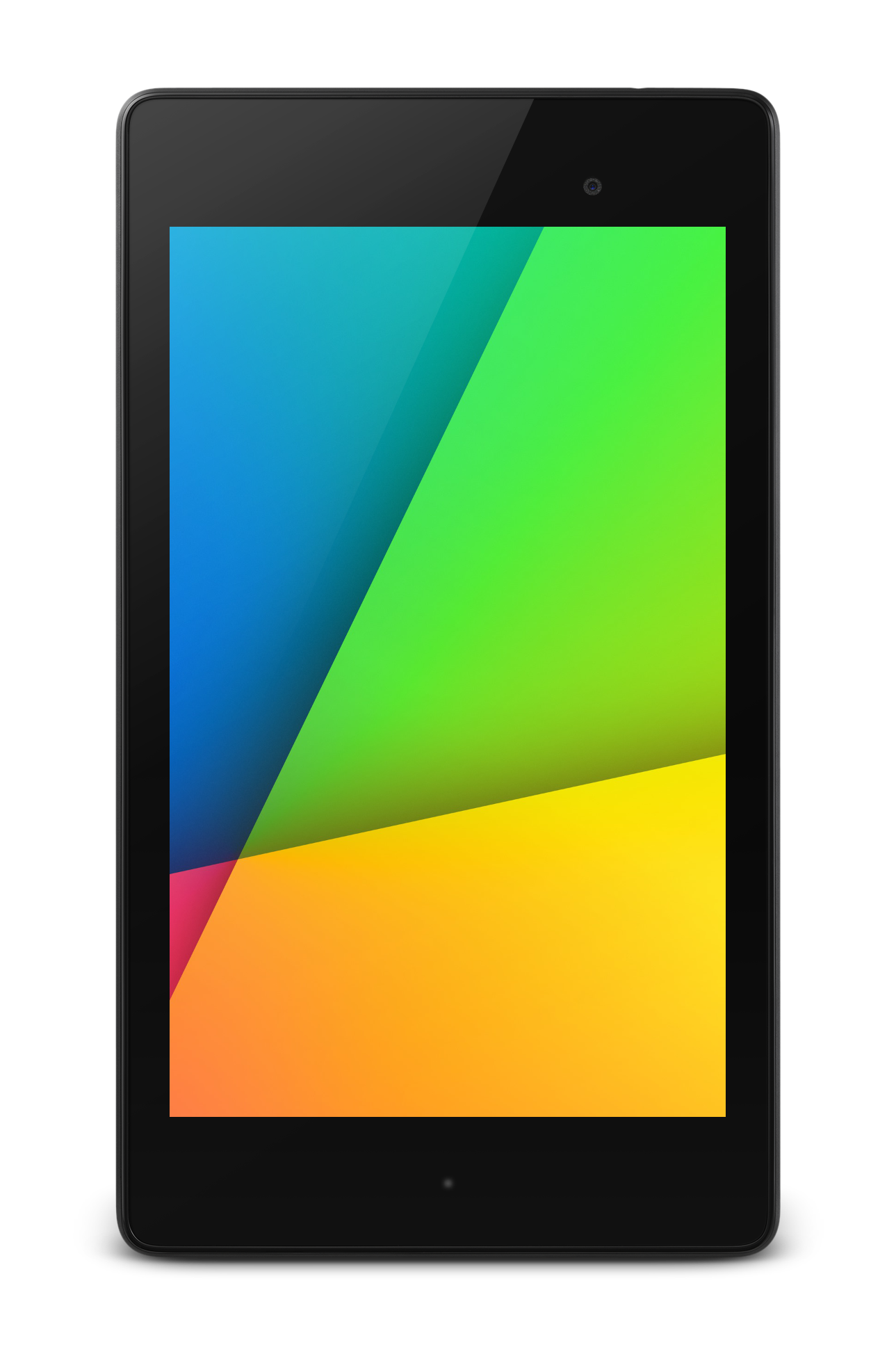
- Nexus 7 (2013) displaying the Android 4.3 wallpaper
- Codename: Razor
- Also known as: Nexus 7 (2013), Nexus 7 (2nd Gen), Nexus 7 FHD
- Developer: Google, Asus
- Manufacturer: Asus
- Product family: Google Nexus
- Type: Tablet computer
- Released: July 26, 2013 (United States); August 13, 2013 (Canada); August 28, 2013 (United Kingdom); November 20, 2013 (India)
- Introductory price: 16 GB: US$229; 32 GB: US$269; 32 GB (LTE model): US$349
- Discontinued: April 25, 2015
- Units sold: 3.5 million to 4 million (Late 2013)
- Operating system: Original: Android 4.3 "Jelly Bean"; Current: Android 6.0.1 "Marshmallow"; Unofficial: Android 11 via LineageOS 18.1
- System on a chip: Qualcomm Snapdragon S4 Pro (Snapdragon 600) APQ8064–1AA
- CPU: 1.51 GHz quad-core Krait 300
- Memory: 2 GB DDR3L RAM
- Storage: 16 or 32 GB
- Display: 7.02 in (178 mm) 16:10 aspect ratio, 323 px/in (127 px/cm) pixel density 1920 × 1200 178° view angle backlit IPS LCD, scratch resistant Corning Fit glass 10 point capacitive touchscreen
- Graphics: 400 MHz quad-core Adreno 320
- Sound: Stereo speakers, 5.1 surround sound by Fraunhofer, MP3, WAV, eAAC+, WMA,
- Input: GPS/GLONASS, dual microphone, gyroscope, accelerometer, light sensor, magnetometer, Hall-effect sensor, proximity sensor (with cellular model)
- Camera: 1.2 MP front-facing 720p video recording, 5.0 MP rear-facing f/2.4 AF, 1080p video recording
- Connectivity: 3.5 mm headphone jack, Bluetooth 4.0, Wi-Fi dual-band (802.11 a/b/g/n @ 2.4 GHz & 5 GHz), Miracast, NFC, micro USB 2.0, Slimport, 4G LTE (with cellular model)
- Power: Internal rechargeable non-removable lithium-ion polymer 3,950 mAh 16 Wh battery, Qi Wireless Charging
- Online services: Google Play
- Dimensions: 200 mm × 114 mm × 8.65 mm (7.87 in × 4.49 in × 0.34 in)
- Weight: Wi-Fi only: 290 g (10 oz); Cellular model: 299 g (10.5 oz)
- Predecessor: Nexus 7 (2012)
- Successor: Nexus 9
- Website: Nexus 7 2013

The second-generation Nexus 7 (also commonly referred to as the Nexus 7 (2013)), is a mini tablet computer co-developed by Google and Asus that runs the Android operating system. It is the third of four tablets in the Google Nexus tablet series (Nexus 7 (2012), Nexus 10, Nexus 7 (2013), and the Nexus 9), the Nexus family including both phones and tablets running essentially stock Android which were originally marketed for developer testing but later marketed by Google to consumers as well, all of which were built by various original equipment manufacturer partners. Following the success of the original Nexus 7, this second generation of the device was released on July 26, 2013, four days earlier than the originally scheduled date due to early releases from various retailers. The tablet was the first device to ship with Android 4.3.

The second iteration of the 7.0 in (180 mm) tablet, code named "Razor", has various upgrades from the previous generation, including a 1.5 GHz quad-core Snapdragon S4 Pro processor, 2 GB of RAM, a 1920 × 1200 pixel display (323 pixels per inch; 127 px/cm), dual cameras (1.2 MP front, 5 MP rear), stereo speakers, built-in inductive Qi wireless charging, and a SlimPort (via micro USB connector) capable of full high-definition video output to an external display.

== Features ==
=== Software ===
Nexus 7 was the first device to be shipped with Android 4.3 "Jelly Bean". All Nexus devices, including the Nexus 7, run a version of Android free of manufacturer or wireless carrier modifications (e.g., custom graphical user interfaces or 'skins' such as TouchWiz and HTC Sense) commonly included on other Android devices. Nexus products also feature an unlockable bootloader, which enabled "rooting" of the device, thereby allowing user access to privileged control over the Android environment, which in turn enables further development or modification of the operating system or replacement of the device's firmware. An update to Android 4.4 was released in November 2013, followed by another update to Android 4.4.2 one month later and eventually an update to Android 4.4.3 in June 2014 and 4.4.4 in July. The Wi-Fi-only variant of the Nexus 7 was one of the two devices for which the Android L developer preview was officially available, the other being the Nexus 5. Android 5.0 "Lollipop" was released in November 2014 for the Wi-Fi only version. In July 2015, Android 5.1.1 was rolled out to the Nexus 7, containing a fix for the Stagefright bug.

In November 2015, Nexus 7 started receiving Android 6.0 "Marshmallow" update across the world. Following which Nexus 7 became one of the first devices to get an Android 6.0.1 Marshmallow update in December 2015. The Nexus 7 (2013) will not receive an official Android 7.0 "Nougat" update, meaning that Android 6.0.1 Marshmallow is the last officially supported Android version for the device.

In December 2020, LineageOS announced official builds of LineageOS 17.1 (a distribution of Android 10 "Q") for the Nexus 7. These require repartitioning the internal eMMC due to the outdated and small partition sizes that the device comes with, and the increasing sizes of modern Android versions. It is currently the only central supported operating system for the device, as Android 6.0.1 (the last version of Android that Google supplied the system with) has not received security patches since September 2018.

=== Hardware and design ===
The Nexus 7 (ASUS-1A005A) is both thinner and lighter than its predecessor. It is manufactured by Asus, and comes with a Qualcomm Snapdragon S4 Pro APQ8064–1AA SoC, (1.5 GHz quad-core Krait 300 and an Adreno 320 GPU, clocked at 400 MHz). The new Nexus 7's SoC is believed to be a variation of Qualcomm's Snapdragon 600 processor (branded as "S4 Pro") underclocked to 1.5 GHz. It has 2 GB of RAM (doubling that of the previous generation) and is available with either 16 GB or 32 GB of internal flash memory storage. Like all other current-generation Google Nexus devices, there is no option for additional storage via micro SD expansion card. The Nexus 7 2013 natively supports OTG cable micro USB to USB flash drives, and USB SD card readers via the Nexus Media Importer for read/write (including NTFS formats). The battery is reported to last up to 9 hours of HD video playback and 10 hours of web browsing or e-reading. The battery's capacity has been lowered from 4,325 mAh in the 2012 Nexus 7 to 3,950 mAh in the 2013 version. Despite this reduction, battery life typically exceeds that of the original due to hardware and software optimizations.

The Nexus 7 screen has a resolution of 1920 × 1200, up from the previous generation's 1280 × 800. Additionally, the panel's contrast ratio and color gamut are reportedly superior to the previous model.

The Nexus 7 was initially available only in black, but in December 2013, a white option was added.

=== Model variants ===
Model	ME571K/K008	ME571KL NA/K009	ME571KL EU/K009
Storage	16/32 GB	32 GB	32 GB
Carriers	None	AT&T, T-Mobile, Verizon	Many
4G	None	LTE: 1/2/3/4/5/13/17 700/750/850/1700/1800/1900/2100 MHz	LTE: 1/2/3/4/5/7/20 800/850/1700/1800/1900/2100/2600 MHz
3G	None	HSPA+: 1/2/4/5/8 850/900/1700/1900/2100	HSPA+: 1/2/4/5/8 850/900/1700/1900/2100
2G	None	GSM: 850/900/1800/1900 MHz	GSM: 850/900/1800/1900 MHz

== Reception ==
The reviews of the second-generation Nexus 7 have been highly favorable, with many reviewers claiming it is the best 7-inch tablet on the market. Reviewers praised the device for its size, design, display, price, inclusion of a rear-facing camera, contemporary user interface and the growing number of tablet-optimized Android applications. It has been praised for being a notable improvement over its predecessor.

Despite the Nexus 7's age, in June 2018, it was still the fourth-most-popular tablet worldwide. Andrew Cunningham, writing in Ars Technica in 2023, called the 2013 Nexus 7 "Google's only great tablet" for its balance of affordability and capability, its design, its long software support period, and for providing a screen large enough to be meaningfully different to a phone without being too large; he said that the tablet may be the nearest any manufacturer has come to producing "the platonic ideal of a small tablet", with all of Google's subsequent tablets falling short of the standard set by the Nexus 7, in part by being less distinct from other manufacturers'.

== See also ==
- Comparison of tablet computers
