= Nexus 10 =

2012 Android tablet by Google and Samsung

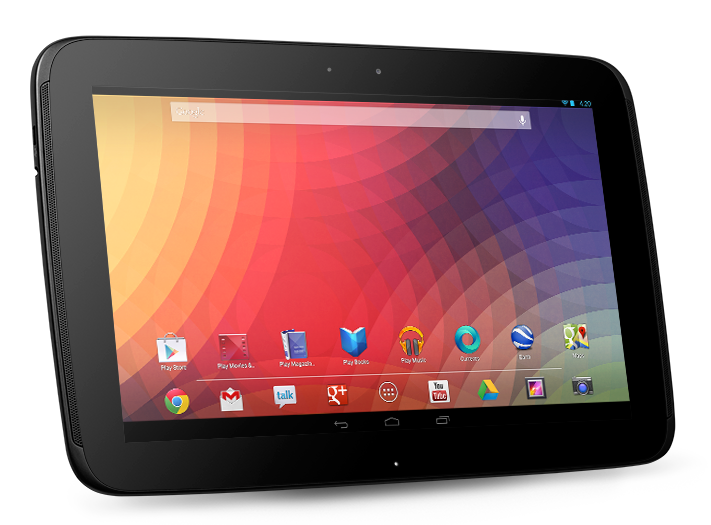
- Nexus 10
- Also known as: manta GT-P8110
- Developer: Google, Samsung Electronics
- Manufacturer: Samsung Electronics
- Product family: Google Nexus
- Type: Tablet computer
- Released: November 13, 2012: Australia; Canada; France; Germany; Spain; United Kingdom; United States; February 5, 2013: Japan
- Introductory price: 16 GB: US$399; 32 GB: US$499
- Operating system: Original: Android 4.2 "Jelly Bean"; Current: Android 5.1.1 "Lollipop"
- System on a chip: Samsung Exynos 5250
- CPU: 1.7 GHz Dual-core Cortex-A15
- Memory: 2 GB 12.8 GB/s LPDDR3 RAM
- Storage: 16 GB or 32 GB
- Display: 10.1 in (260 mm) 16:10 aspect ratio, 300 ppi pixel density 2560×1600 WQXGA, 16M colors, Scratch resistant Corning Gorilla Glass 2 Capacitive touchscreen PLS-backlit LCD
- Graphics: Mali-T604
- Sound: MP3, WAV, eAAC+, WMA
- Input: Accelerometer, Gyroscope, Proximity sensor, Digital Compass, GPS, Magnetometer, Barometer, Microphone
- Camera: Rear: 5 MP with flash HD (1080p) resolution Front: 1.9 MP; HD (720p) resolution
- Connectivity: 3.5 mm earphone jack, Bluetooth 3.0, Wi-Fi (802.11 b/g/n @ 2.4 GHz & 5 GHz Dual-band) (MIMO+HT40), Micro-HDMI, dual-side NFC, Micro USB 2.0, docking pins
- Power: Internal non-removable rechargeable lithium-ion polymer 9000 mAh battery (Micro USB 10W charging)
- Online services: Google Play
- Dimensions: 263.9 mm × 177.6 mm × 8.9 mm (10.39 in × 6.99 in × 0.35 in)
- Weight: 21.3 oz (603 g)
- Successor: Nexus 9

The Nexus 10 is a tablet computer co-developed by Google and Samsung Electronics that runs the Android operating system. It is the second tablet in the Google Nexus series, a family of Android consumer devices marketed by Google and built by an OEM partner. Following the success of the 7-inch Nexus 7, the first Google Nexus tablet, the Nexus 10 was released with a 10.1-inch, 2560×1600 pixel display, which was the world's highest resolution tablet display at the time of its release. The Nexus 10 was announced on October 29, 2012, and became available on November 13, 2012.

The device is available in two storage sizes, 16 GB for US$399 and 32 GB for US$499. Along with the Nexus 4 mobile phone, the Nexus 10 launched Android 4.2 ("Jelly Bean"), which offered several new features, such as: 360° panoramic photo stitching called "Photo Sphere"; a quick settings menu; widgets on the lock screen; gesture typing; an updated version of Google Now; and multiple user accounts for tablets.

Google revealed the device on October 29, 2012, to mixed-to-favorable reactions. Due to high demand, the device quickly sold out through the Google Play Store. Since its release, the device has gone through three major software updates and is currently upgradable to Android 5.1.1 ("Lollipop"). Official software support for Android versions after 5.1.1 will not be offered; however, security patches will be provided at least 3 years after the release of the device.

== History ==
Google was scheduled to launch the Nexus 10 along with the Nexus 4 and Android 4.2 at a conference event in New York City on October 29, 2012, however, the event was cancelled because of Hurricane Sandy.

Instead, the device was announced the same day in an official press release in Google's blog, along with the Nexus 4 and the 32 GB, cellular connectivity-capable Nexus 7.

The Nexus 10 became available for sale in the United States, the United Kingdom, Australia, France, Germany, Spain, and Canada on November 13, 2012. Japan was supposed to be included in the November 13 launch but the release was postponed. The tablet became available on February 5.

The Nexus 10 went through repeated patterns of availability across international Google Play Stores, while the 32 GB version was more consistently out of stock. The 32 GB Nexus 10 was sold out within hours of its release in Google Play, while the 16 GB version was still available for sale. Google Play stores in the United States and Canada received the Nexus 10 and quickly sold out.

== Features ==
=== Software ===
The Nexus 10 shipped with Android 4.2 ("Jelly Bean") as its operating system and is upgradable to Android 5.1.1 ("Lollipop") since March 9, 2015. It ships with preinstalled applications, such as Google Chrome, Gmail, Play Music, Play Books, Play Movies, the Play Store application, YouTube, Currents, Google+, Maps, and People.

=== Hardware and design ===
The Nexus 10 features a Samsung Exynos 5250 system on chip, a dual-core 1.7 GHz Cortex A15 central processing unit and a quad-core ARM Mali-T604 graphics processing unit. The device also includes a primary 5-megapixel, rear-facing camera with LED flash, able to shoot 1080p video at 30 frames per second and take 2592×1936 resolution images with features such as autofocus, face detection and geotagging, and a secondary 1.9-megapixel, front-facing camera.

It is encased in a plastic chassis and the rear of the device comprises a smooth, plastic surface, except for a strip of removable, dimpled plastic material, similar to the Nexus 7's rear, that hides FCC brandings. The rear of the Nexus 10 also includes a large "nexus" branding, for the line of mobile devices it belongs to, and a smaller "Samsung" branding, for the manufacturer of the device. There is, also, no mention of Google, the device's distributor and the maker of the Nexus 10's operating system, Android, on its hardware. On the top of the Nexus 10 are the volume controls and the power button, on the left side of the device lies a 3.5 mm headphone jack and a microUSB port, used for charging or connecting the device to a PC or other USB-compatible device. On the right side of the device, there is only a microHDMI port and at the bottom, there is a magnetic pogo pin used for docking and charging.

A 9,000 mAh lithium polymer battery powers the Nexus 10, and is reportedly capable of 9 hours of video playback, 90 hours of audio playback, 7 hours of web browsing, and 500 hours (20.8 days) of standby time.

The Nexus 10 has a 10.055 inches (255.4 mm) liquid crystal display with a 2560×1600 WQXGA display resolution, giving it a pixel density of 300 pixels per inch and a 16:10 aspect ratio. The display also features a "True RGB Real Stripe PLS" TFT panel and a capacitive, multi-touch screen, protected by scratch-resistant Corning Gorilla Glass 2, and is capable of displaying over 16.7 million colours.

== Reception ==
The Nexus 10 received mixed-to-favorable reviews.

- TechCrunch columnist Drew Olanoff said that Android was a better experience on a tablet than iOS and concluded "Apple has an advantage, but Google is right there on the cusp of something amazing,"
- The Gadget Show called the Nexus 10 "the best 'big' Android tablet we've ever seen. The screen alone puts it ahead of the competition, the screen on the Google Nexus 10 is phenomenal. It's every bit as stunning as the Retina Display on the third and fourth generation iPads. It really has to be seen to be believed: it's like a printed sticker on the glass, and makes reading a delight."
- Tim Stevens of Engadget says "Google's latest reference tablet packs an amazing resolution but ultimately fails to distance itself from the competition."
- Eric Franklin of CNET states "[...] the Nexus 10 has superior design and performance, and the features available in Android 4.2 may be worth price of admission alone."
- James Rogerson of TechRadar wrote "Ultimately, other than the price, there's little reason for Apple fans to jump ship to the Nexus 10, equally the Nexus 10 puts up enough of a defence to keep the Android faithful happy."
- Laptop Magazine, CNET, and PCWorld all rated the Nexus 10 at 4 out of 5 stars, while TechRadar gave the device 4.5 stars out of 5.
- PC Magazine and Wired gave the device a rating of 3 out of 5, and 8 out of 10, respectively.

Commentators noted the lack of an SD card slot for expandable storage, absence of cellular connectivity, low color contrast and saturation, and limited selection of tablet-optimized Android apps, while praising the Nexus 10's high display resolution, powerful, high-performance processor and contemporary user interface.

== See also ==
- Comparison of tablet computers
- Comparison of Google Nexus tablets
