= Huawei Ascend Y600 =

Smartphone

- Brand: Huawei
- Manufacturer: Huawei
- Type: Smartphone
- Series: Huawei Ascend
- First released: April 29, 2014 (India); May 26, 2014 (Philippines)
- Discontinued: Yes
- Compatible networks: GSM / HSPA
- Form factor: Slate
- Colors: Black; White
- Dimensions: 144.5 mm (5.69 in) H 74.5 mm (2.93 in) W 10.8 mm (0.43 in) D
- Weight: 180 g (6.3 oz)
- Operating system: Android 4.2 (Jelly Bean)
- System-on-chip: Mediatek MT6572 (28 nm)
- CPU: Dual-core 1.3 GHz Cortex-A7
- GPU: Mali-400
- Memory: 512 MB RAM
- Storage: 4 GB
- Removable storage: microSDHC (dedicated slot)
- SIM: Micro-SIM
- Battery: Removable Li-Ion 2100 mAh
- Rear camera: 5 MP
- Front camera: VGA
- Display: 5.0 in (127 mm) TFT, 480 x 854 pixels (~196 ppi density)
- Model: Y600-U20

The Huawei Ascend Y600 is anl Android 3G smartphone manufactured and designed by Huawei. Announced on April 1, 2014, it was released on April 29, 2014 in India and on May 26, 2014 in the Philippines.

== Specifications ==
=== Hardware ===
The Ascend Y600 was powered by a 28-mn Mediatek MT6572 paired with a dual-core 1.2 GHz Cortex-A7 central processor and a Mali-400 graphics processor. It has a li-ion battery, which is user-replaceable, with a capacity of 2100 mAh.

The Ascend Y600 features a 5.0-inch TFT display with a resolution of 480 × 854 pixels (16:9). It has a pixel density of 196 pixels per inch.

Its internal storage has only one confuguration of 512MB of RAM and 4GB of storage. It includes a 5MP primary camera with recording capability and a front-facing VGA camera.

=== Software ===
The Ascend Y600 runs on Android 4.2 Jelly Bean.
