= Acer Liquid Z5 =

Smartphone manufactured by Acer Inc.

- Manufacturer: Acer Inc.
- Type: Smartphone
- Series: Acer Liquid
- First released: February 2014
- Form factor: Slate
- Operating system: Android 4.2 Jelly Bean
- Memory: 512 MB RAM
- Storage: 4 GB
- Removable storage: Up to 64 GB (microSD)
- Battery: 2000 mAh
- Rear camera: 5.0 MP with LED flash
- Display: 5.00 in (127 mm) diagonal LCD
- Connectivity: WiFi 802.11b/g/n, Bluetooth 3.0, GPS

The Acer Liquid Z5 is a smartphone developed by Acer Inc. of Taiwan. It was announced at the 2014 Consumer Electronics Show in January 2014. The Liquid Z5 features a 5.00 in (127 mm) diagonal LCD and Android 4.2 Jelly Bean.
