= Nexus 9 =

2014 Android tablet computer by Google and HTC

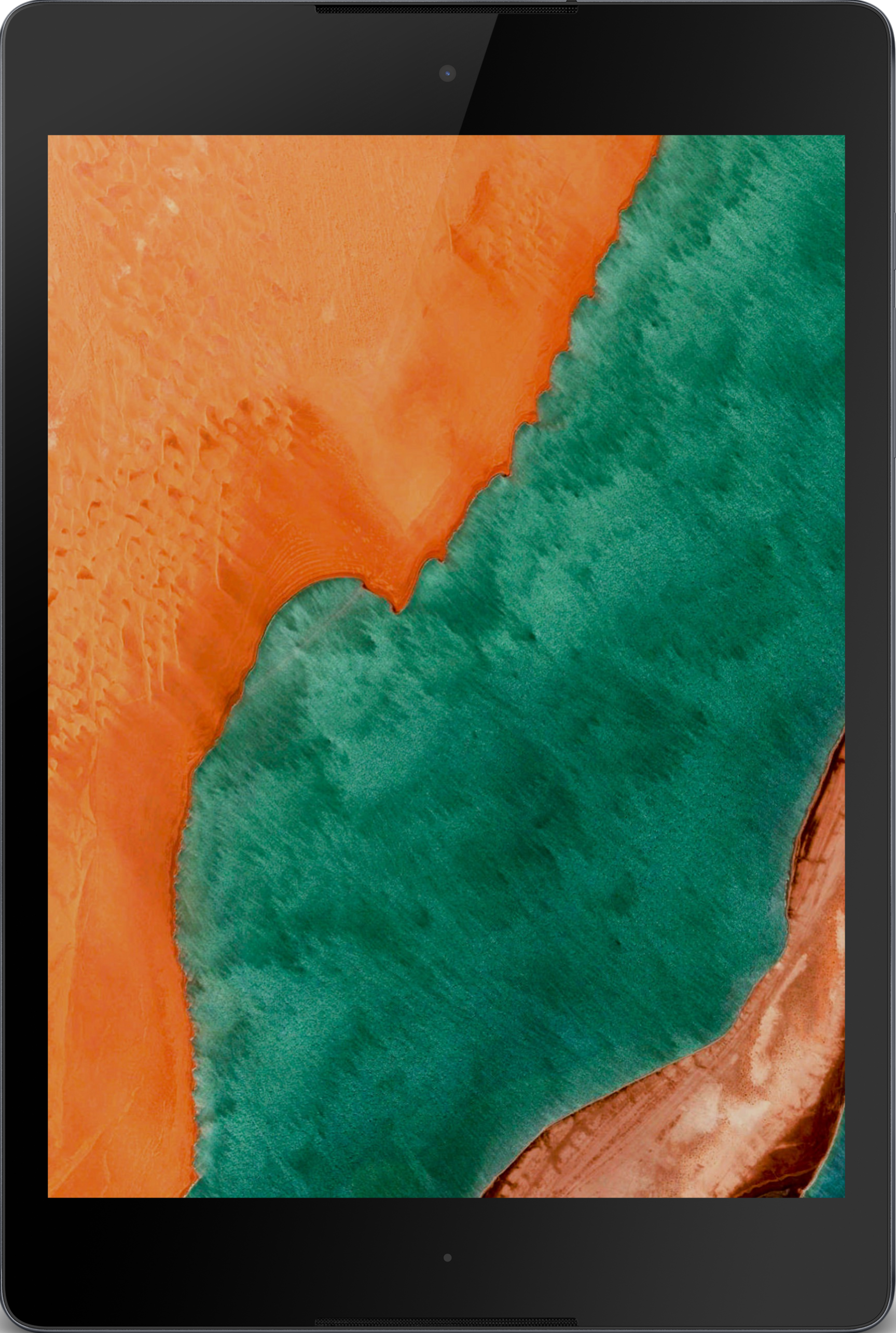
- Nexus 9 displaying the Nexus 9 wallpaper
- Also known as: Volantis, Flounder
- Developer: Google, HTC
- Manufacturer: HTC
- Product family: Google Nexus
- Type: Tablet computer
- Released: US November 3, 2014
- Introductory price: 16 GB: US$399; 32 GB: US$479
- Discontinued: May 26, 2016
- Operating system: Original: Android 5.0 "Lollipop"; Last: Android 7.1.2 "Nougat"
- System on a chip: NVIDIA Tegra K1
- CPU: 2.3 GHz dual-core 64-bit Denver
- Memory: 2 GB LPDDR3-1600 RAM
- Storage: 16 or 32 GB flash memory
- Display: 8.9 in (230 mm) 4:3 aspect ratio, 281 ppi pixel density 2048×1536 QXGA backlit IPS LCD, scratch resistant Corning Gorilla Glass 3 capacitive touchscreen
- Graphics: 192-core Kepler, 16M colors
- Sound: Dual front-facing speakers with HTC BoomSound
- Input: Multi-touch screen, accelerometer, gyroscope, GPS, magnetometer, dual microphone
- Camera: Rear: 8 MP with flash HD (1080p) resolution Front: 1.6 MP; HD (720p) resolution
- Connectivity: 3.5 mm combo headphone/microphone jack, Bluetooth 4.1, Wi-Fi (802.11 b/g/n/ac @ 2.4 GHz & 5 GHz Dual-band) (MIMO+HT40), Quad-band GSM, CDMA, Penta-band HSPA, LTE, NFC, Micro-USB 2.0
- Power: Internal rechargeable non-removable lithium-ion polymer 3.8 V 25.46 W·h (6,700 mA·h) battery
- Online services: Google Play
- Dimensions: 228.25 mm (8.99 in) (h); 153.68 mm (6.05 in) (w); 7.95 mm (0.31 in) (d)
- Weight: 425 g (15.0 oz) (WiFi); 436 g (15.4 oz) (LTE)
- Predecessor: Nexus 7 (2013); Nexus 10
- Successor: Pixel C
- Website: www.google.com/nexus/9/

The Nexus 9 (codenamed Volantis or Flounder) is a tablet computer co-developed by Google and HTC that runs the Android operating system. It is the fourth tablet in the Google Nexus series, a family of Android consumer devices marketed by Google and built by an OEM partner. The device is available in two storage sizes, 16 GB for US$399 and 32 GB for US$479. Along with the Nexus 6 mobile phone and Nexus Player digital media device, the Nexus 9 launched with 5.0 Lollipop, which offered several new features, notably a modified visual appearance, and the complete replacement of the Dalvik virtual machine with ART. Google has included an additional step to "Enable OEM unlock" before users can unlock the Nexus 9 bootloader.

== Release ==
The Nexus 9 was announced on 15 October 2014, with pre-orders available on 17 October, and was released on 3 November 2014. A 4G LTE version was released in the US on 12 December 2014.

== Specifications ==
=== Hardware ===
The Nexus 9 tablet features an 8.9-inch IPS LCD with a 1536x2048 resolution and Corning Gorilla Glass 3. It runs the NVIDIA Tegra K1 processor and has 2 GB of RAM.

=== Software ===
The Nexus 9 originally featured Android 5.0 Lollipop.

In December 2014, Android 5.0.1 Lollipop was released for the Nexus 9. Android 5.0.2 Lollipop was released for the device a few months later, in May 2015. Later that month, Android 5.1.1 Lollipop was released for the Nexus 9 as well.

Google released the Android 6.0 Marshmallow update for the Nexus 9 in October 2015. In December 2015, Android 6.0.1 Marshmallow was released for the Nexus 9, among other devices.

On August 22, 2016, Google released the Android 7.0 Nougat update for the Nexus 9, as well as several other devices. In January 2017, Google announced that the Nexus 9, along with the Nexus 6, will not receive the Android 8 update, making 7.1.2 the last major software update from Google itself.

== See also ==
- Comparison of tablet computers
- Comparison of Google Nexus tablets
