= Android Jelly Bean =

2012 Android mobile operating system

- Version of the Android operating system

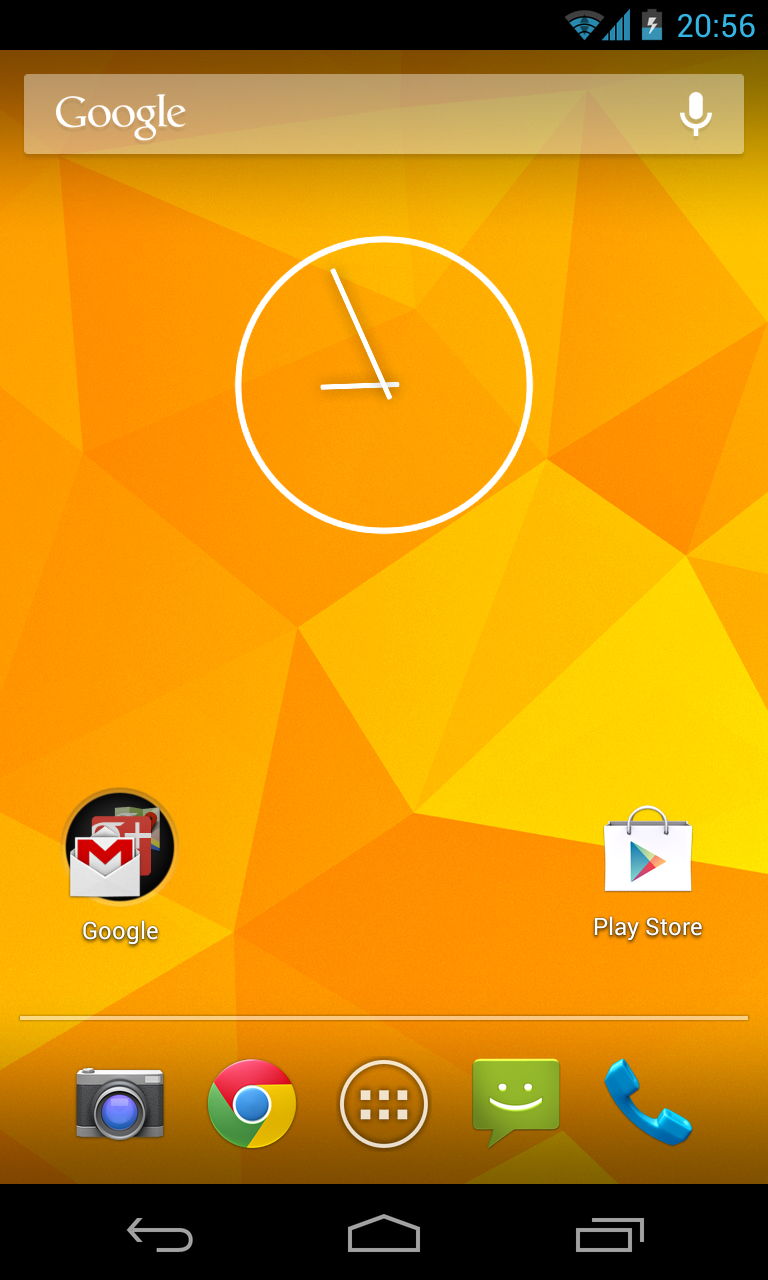
- Android 4.2 Jelly Bean running on a Nexus 4
- Developer: Google
- Released to manufacturing: July 9, 2012; 14 years ago (as Android 4.1, API 16) October 9, 2012; 14 years ago (as Android 4.1.2, API 16) November 13, 2012; 14 years ago (as Android 4.2, API 17) July 24, 2013; 13 years ago (as Android 4.3, API 18)
- Final release: 4.3.1_r2 (JLS36I) / October 4, 2013; 13 years ago
- Kernel type: Monolithic (Linux)
- Preceded by: Android Ice Cream Sandwich (4.0)
- Succeeded by: Android KitKat (4.4)
- Official website: www.android.com/versions/jelly-bean-4-3/

Support status
- All versions: Unsupported as of September 29, 2015; Google Play Services support dropped since August 2021

Android Jelly Bean (Android 4.1, 4.2, 4.3) is the codename for the tenth version of the Android mobile operating system developed by Google, spanning three major point releases (versions 4.1 through 4.3.1). Among the devices that were launched with Android 4.1 to 4.3 already installed are the Nexus 7 (2012), Nexus 4, Nexus 10, and Nexus 7 (2013).

The first of these three releases, 4.1, was unveiled at Google's I/O developer conference in May 2012. It focused on performance improvements to give the operating system a smoother, more responsive feel, improvements to the notification system that allow expandable notifications with action buttons, and other internal changes. Two more releases were made under the Jelly Bean name in October 2012 and July 2013, respectively, including 4.2—which included further optimizations, multi-user support for tablets, lock screen widgets, quick settings, and screensavers, and 4.3—which contained further improvements and updates to the underlying Android platform. The first device with Android Jelly Bean was the 2012 Nexus 7.

As of March 2026, 0.02% of Android devices run Jelly Bean. In July 2021, Google announced that Google Play Services would no longer support Jelly Bean after August of that year.

== Development ==
Android 4.1 Jelly Bean was first unveiled at the Google I/O developer conference on June 27, 2012, with a focus on "delightful" improvements to the platform's user interface, along with improvements to Google's search experience on the platform (such as Knowledge Graph integration, and the then-new digital assistant Google Now), the unveiling of the Asus-produced Nexus 7 tablet, and the unveiling of the Nexus Q media player.

For Jelly Bean, work was made on optimizing the operating system's visual performance and responsiveness through a series of changes referred to as "Project Butter": graphical output is now triple buffered, vsync is used across all drawing operations, and the CPU is brought to full power when touch input is detected—preventing the lag associated with inputs made while the processor is in a low-power state. These changes allow the operating system to run at a full 60 frames per second on capable hardware.

Following 4.1, two more Android releases were made under the Jelly Bean codename; both focused primarily on performance improvements and changes to the Android platform itself and contained relatively few user-facing changes. Alongside Android 4.1, Google also began to decouple APIs for its services on Android into a new system-level component known as Google Play Services, serviced through the Google Play Store. This allows the addition of certain forms of functionality without having to distribute an upgrade to the operating system itself, addressing the infamous "fragmentation" problems experienced by the Android ecosystem.

== Release ==
Attendees of the Google I/O conference were given Nexus 7 tablets pre-loaded with Android 4.1, and Galaxy Nexus smartphones that could be upgraded to 4.1. Google announced an intent to release 4.1 updates for existing Nexus devices and the Motorola Xoom tablet by mid-July. The Android 4.1 upgrade was released to the general public for GSM Galaxy Nexus models on July 10, 2012. In late 2012, following the official release of Jelly Bean, a number of third-party Android OEMs began to prepare and distribute updates to 4.1 for their existing smartphones and tablets, including devices from Acer, HTC, LG, Motorola, Samsung, Sony, and Toshiba. In August 2012, nightly builds of the aftermarket firmware CyanogenMod based on 4.1 (branded as CyanogenMod 10) began to be released for selected devices, including some Nexus devices (the Nexus S and Galaxy Nexus), the Samsung Galaxy S, Galaxy S II, Galaxy Tab 2 7.0, Motorola Xoom, and Asus Transformer.

On November 13, 2012, Google unveiled Android 4.2, dubbed "a sweeter tasting Jelly Bean", alongside its accompanying launch devices, the Nexus 4 and Nexus 10. The event was originally scheduled for October 29, 2012, but it was postponed because of Hurricane Sandy. Firmware updates for the Nexus 7 and Galaxy Nexus were released in November 2012. Android 4.3 was subsequently released on July 24, 2013, via firmware updates to the Galaxy Nexus, 2012 Nexus 7, Nexus 4, and Nexus 10.

== Features ==
=== User experience ===
Visually, Jelly Bean's interface builds on the Holo appearance introduced by Android 4.0. The default home screen of Jelly Bean received new features, such as the ability for other shortcuts and widgets on a home screen page to re-arrange themselves to fit an item being moved or resized. The notification system was also improved with the addition of expandable, actionable notifications; individual notifications can now display additional content or action buttons (such as Call back or Message on a missed call), accessible by dragging the notification open with a two-finger gesture. Notifications can also be turned off individually per app.

Android 4.2 added additional features to the user interface: the lock screen can be swiped left to display widget pages and right to go to the camera. A pane of quick settings toggles (a feature often seen in OEM Android skins) was also added to the notification area— accessible by either swiping down with two fingers on phones, swiping down from the top-right edge of the screen on tablets, or pressing a button on the top-right corner of the notifications pane. The previous Browser application was officially deprecated on 4.2 in favor of Google Chrome for Android. 4.2 also adds gesture typing on the keyboard, a redesigned Clock app, and a new screensaver system known as Daydreams. On tablets, Android 4.2 also supports multiple users.

To promote consistency between device classes, Android tablets now use an expanded version of the interface layout and home screen used by phones by default, with centered navigation keys and a status bar across the top. These changes took effect on 4.1 for small tablets (such as the Nexus 7) and on 4.2 for larger tablets. Small tablets on Android are optimized primarily for use in portrait (vertical) orientation, giving apps layouts that are expanded versions of those used on phones. When used in a "landscape" (horizontal) orientation, apps adapt to widescreen layouts common on larger tablets. On large tablets, navigation buttons were previously placed in the bottom-left of a bar along the bottom of the screen, with the clock and notification area in the bottom-right.

=== Platform ===
For developers, 4.1 also added new accessibility APIs, expanded language support with bi-directional text support and user-supplied keymaps, support for managing external input devices (such as video game controllers), support for multichannel, USB, and gapless audio, a new media routing API, low-level access to hardware and software audio and video codecs, Android Open Accessory v2 and DNS-based service discovery and pre-associated service discovery for Wi-Fi. Android Beam can now also be used to initiate Bluetooth file transfers through near-field communication.

Android 4.2 added a rewritten Bluetooth stack, changing from the previous Bluez stack (GPL created by Qualcomm) to a rewritten Broadcom open source stack called BlueDroid. The new stack, initially considered "immature" promised several forward-looking benefits, including improved support for multiple displays, support for Miracast, native right-to-left support, updated developer tools, further accessibility improvements such as zooming gestures, and several internal security improvements such as always-on VPN support and app verification. A new NFC stack was added at the same time.

Android 4.3 consisted of further low-level changes, including Bluetooth low energy and AVRCP support, SELinux, OpenGL ES 3.0, new digital rights management (DRM) APIs, the ability for apps to read notifications, a VP8 encoder, and other improvements.

Android 4.3 also included a hidden privacy feature known as "App Ops", which allowed users to deny permissions to apps individually. However, the feature was later removed in Android 4.4.2; a Google spokesperson stated that it was experimental and could prevent certain apps from functioning correctly if used in certain ways. The concept was revisited as the basis of a redesigned permissions system for Android 6.0.

== See also ==
- Android version history
- Firefox OS
- iOS 6
- Windows Phone 8
- Windows 8
- OS X Mountain Lion
