= Google Nexus =

Series of electronic devices by Google

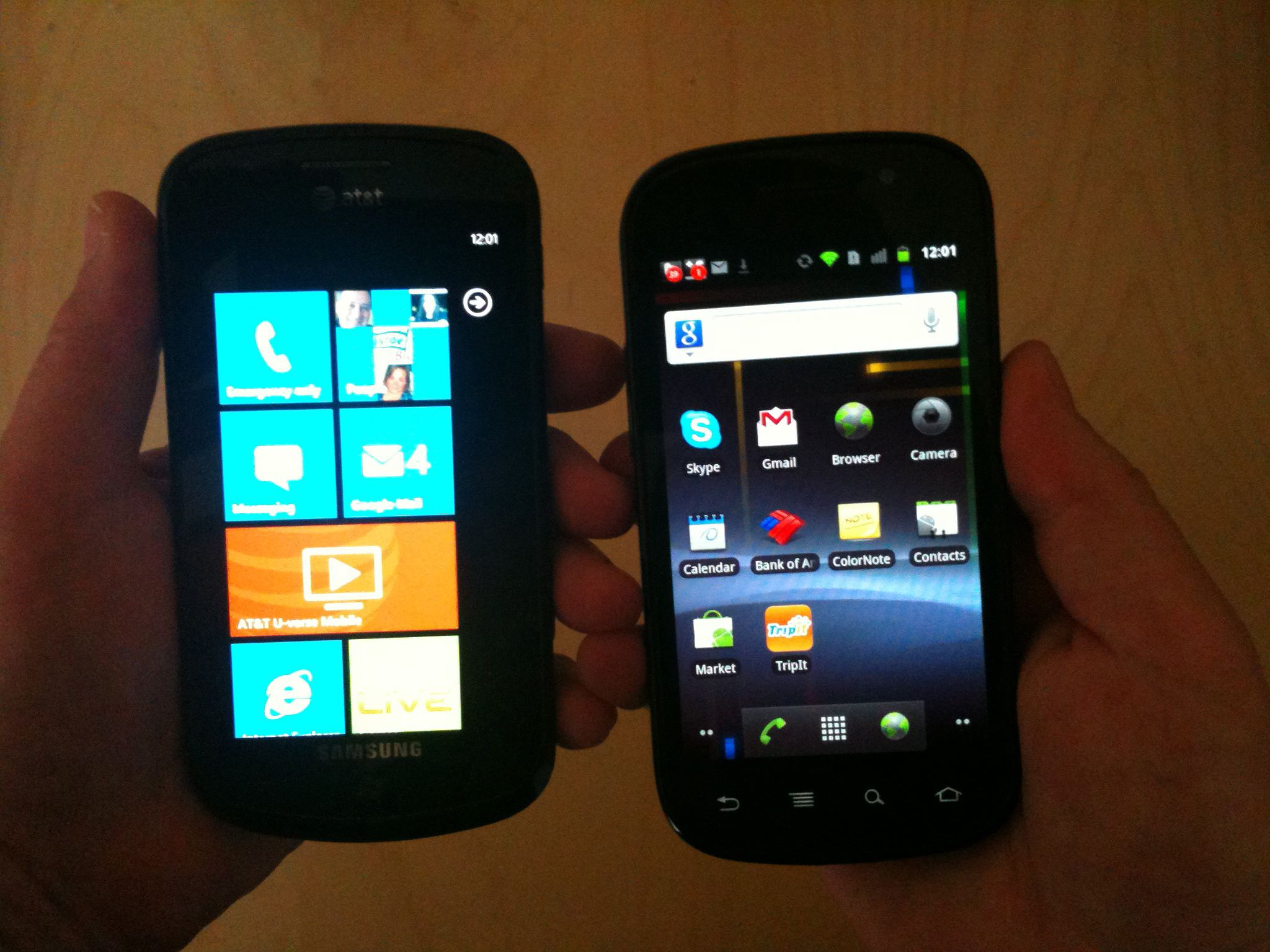
- A Nexus S running Android 2.3 (right) next to a Samsung Focus running Windows Phone 7 (left)
- Developer: Google
- Manufacturer: Google, various
- Type: Smartphones, tablets, digital media players
- Released: January 5, 2010; 16 years ago
- Discontinued: October 2016; 10 years ago
- Operating system: Android
- Online services: Google Play
- Successor: Google Pixel

Google Nexus is a discontinued line of consumer electronic mobile devices that ran a stock version of the Android operating system. Google managed the design, development, marketing, and support of these devices, but some development and all manufacturing were carried out by partnering with original equipment manufacturers (OEMs).

Alongside the main smartphone products, the line also included tablet computers (e.g. the Nexus 7) and streaming media players (e.g. the Nexus Q); the Nexus line started out in January 2010 and reached its end in October 2016, replaced by Google Pixel family.

Devices in the Nexus line were considered Google's core Android products. They contained little to no manufacturer or wireless carrier modifications to Android (such as custom user interfaces), although devices sold through carriers may be SIM locked, had some extra branding, and may have received software updates at a slower pace than the unlocked variant. Save for some carrier-specific variants, Nexus devices were often among the first Android devices to receive updates to the operating system. All Nexus devices featured an unlockable bootloader to allow further development and end-user modification. Although Nexus devices were originally produced in small quantities as they were intended as developer phones, the lack of bloatware/modifications to Android while providing similar performance to more expensive flagship smartphones from OEMs gained Nexus devices a considerable following. In addition to the Nexus program, Google also sold Google Play editions of OEM devices, which run the "stock" version of Android without the OEM nor carrier modifications.

OEMs that were part of the Nexus program were namely HTC, Samsung, LG, Motorola, Huawei and Asus. In late 2016, the Nexus lineup was replaced by the Google Pixel, which provides a similar stock Android experience but sold for considerably higher prices, directly competing with flagship smartphones from OEMs. Google stated that they "don't want to close a door completely, but there is no plan right now to do more Nexus devices." In 2017, Google partnered with HMD Global in making new Nokia phones, as part of the Android One program, which has been considered by some as a spiritual successor to the Nexus.

== Devices ==
=== Phones ===
==== Nexus One ====
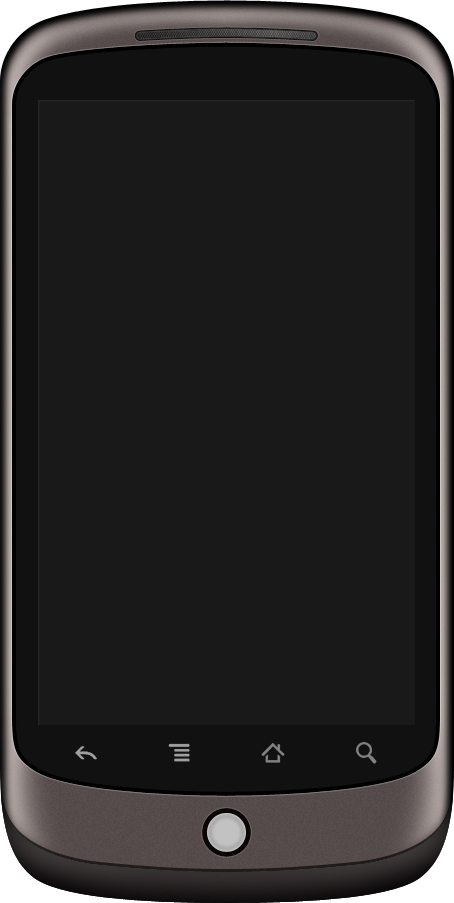
Nexus One

The Nexus One was manufactured by HTC and released in January 2010 as the first Nexus phone. It was released with Android 2.1 Eclair, and was updated in May 2010 to be the first phone with Android 2.2 Froyo. It was further updated to Android 2.3 Gingerbread. It was announced that Google would cease support for the Nexus One, whose graphics processing unit (GPU) is poor at rendering the new 2D acceleration engine of the UI in Android 4.0 Ice Cream Sandwich. The Nexus S and newer models have hardware designed to handle the new rendering. It was the only Nexus device to have card storage expandability (SD).

- Display: 3.7" display with 800×480 pixel resolution
- CPU: 1 GHz Qualcomm Scorpion
- Storage: 512 MB (expandable)
- RAM: 512 MB
- GPU: Adreno 200
- Camera: 5 MP rear camera

==== Nexus S ====
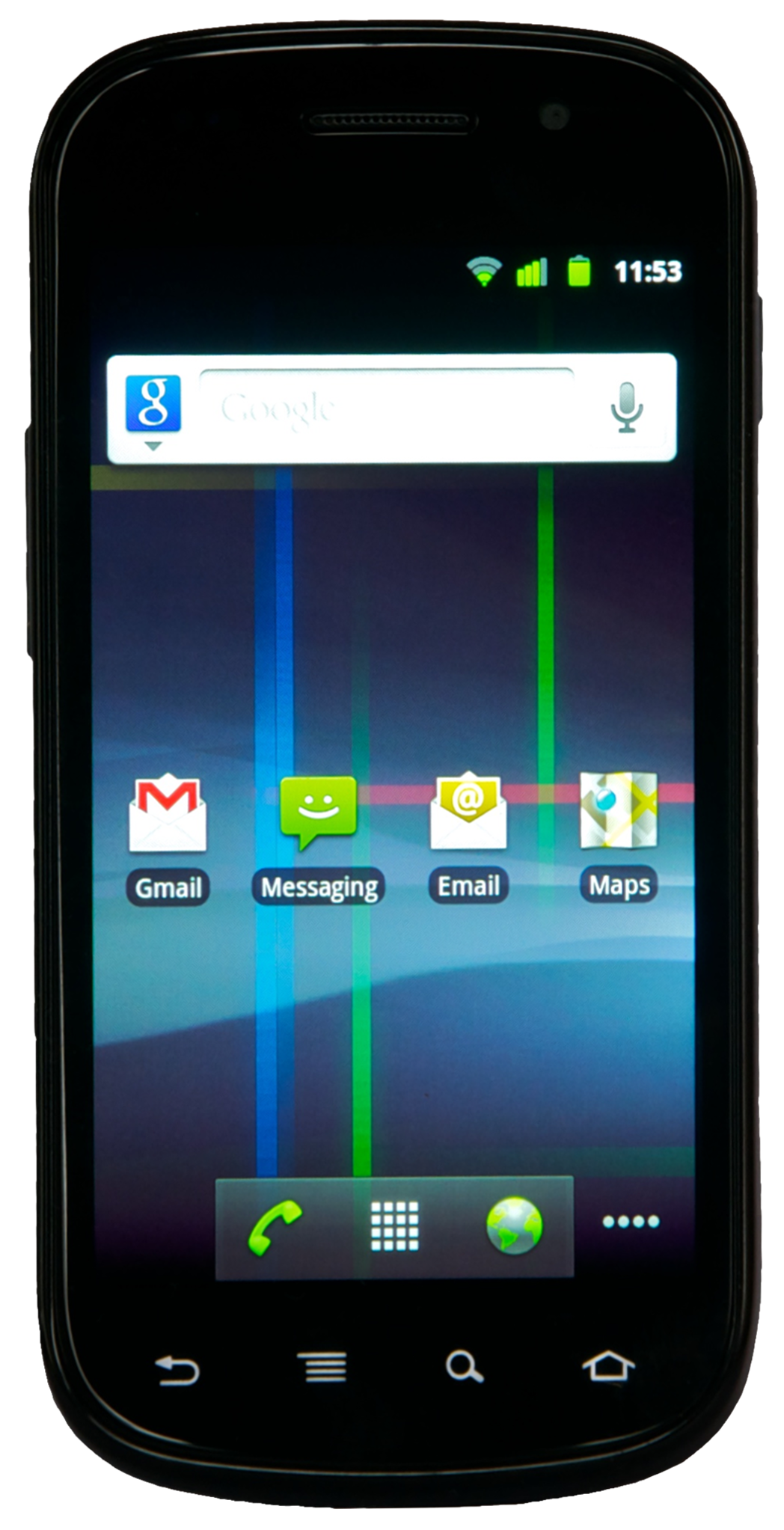
Nexus S

The Nexus S, manufactured by Samsung, was released on December 16, 2010, to coincide with the release of Android 2.3 Gingerbread. In December 2011 it was updated to Android 4.0 Ice Cream Sandwich, with most variations later being updatable to Android 4.1 Jelly Bean in July 2012. The device's support was ended after 4.1 Jelly Bean and no longer receives updates from Google.

- Display: 4.0" display with 800×480 pixel resolution
- Chipset: Hummingbird
- CPU: 1 GHz single-core ARM Cortex-A8
- Storage: 16 GB (Partitioned: 1 GB internal storage and 15 GB USB storage)
- RAM: 512 MB
- GPU: PowerVR SGX540
- Battery: 1500 mAH (replaceable) (After Ended)

==== Galaxy Nexus ====
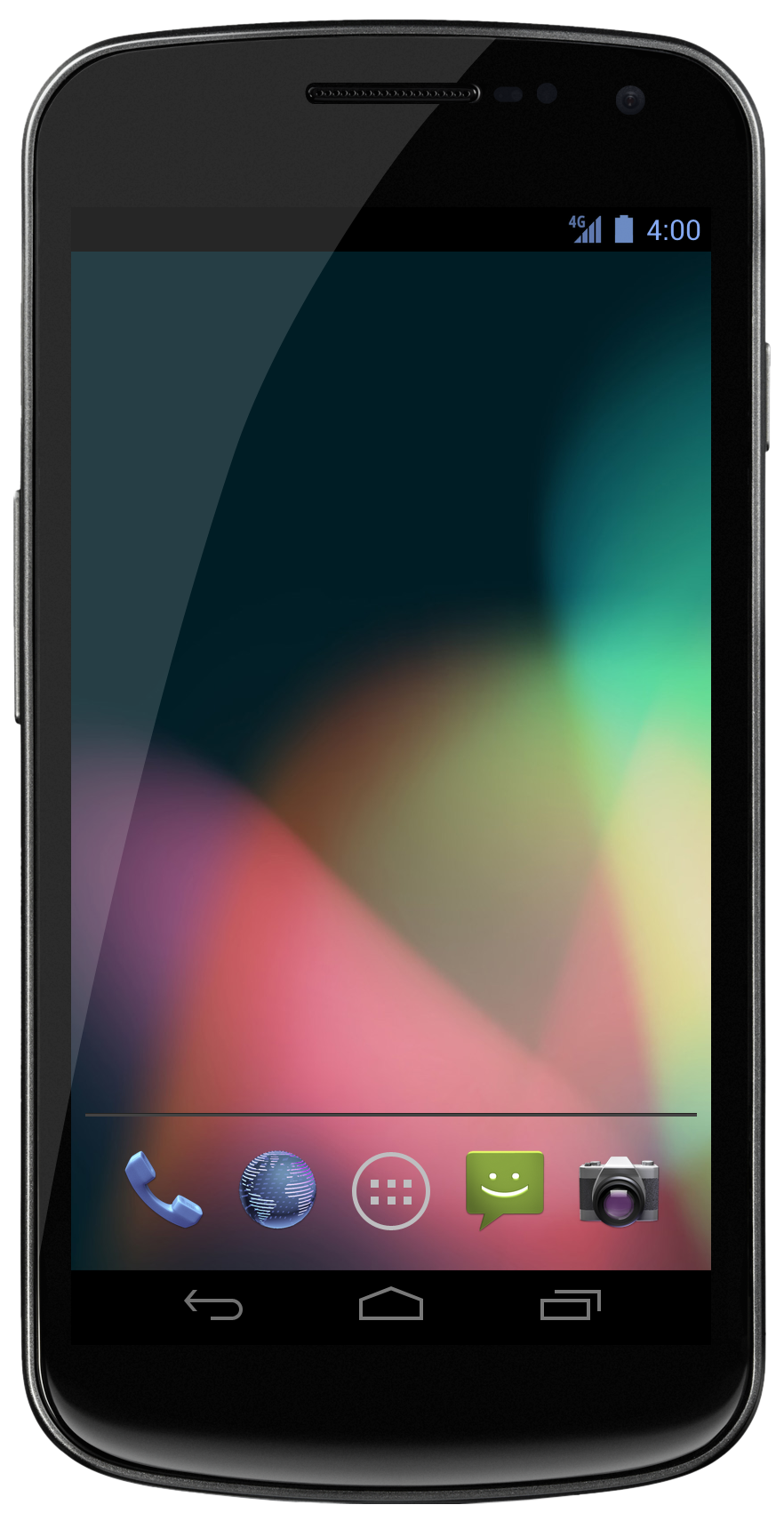
Galaxy Nexus

The Galaxy Nexus, again manufactured by Samsung, was released in November 2011 (GSM version, US version released on December 15, 2011) to coincide with the release of Android 4.0 Ice Cream Sandwich. The device support was ended after 4.3 Jelly Bean and no longer receives updates from Google. This device is known in Brazil as Galaxy X due to a trademark on the "Nexus" brand. It is also the last Nexus device to have a removable battery.

- Display: 4.65" HD Super AMOLED display with 1280×720 pixel resolution
- CPU: 1.2 GHz dual-core ARM Cortex A9
- Storage: 16 or 32 GB
- RAM: 1 GB

==== Nexus 4 ====
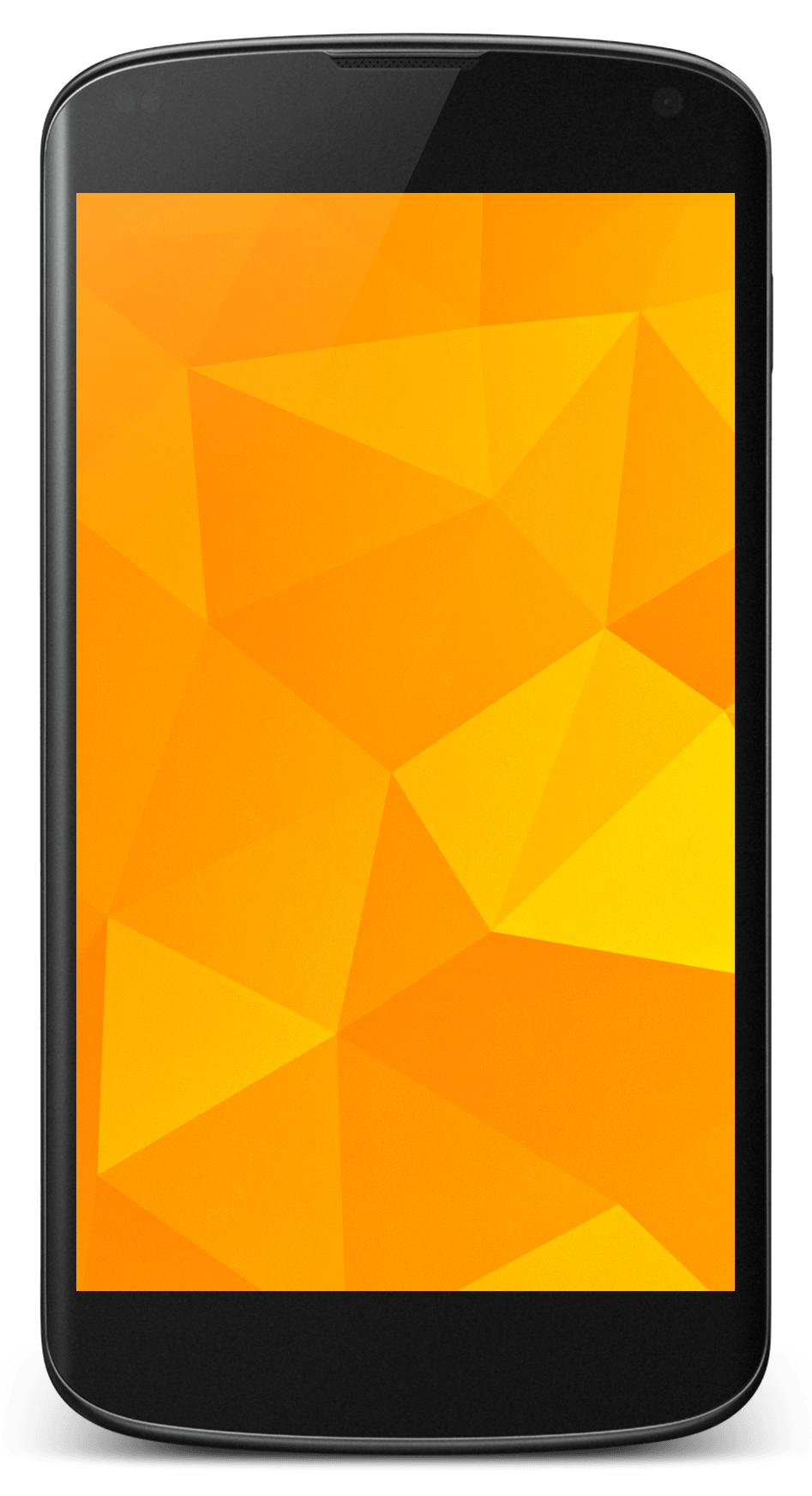
Nexus 4

The Nexus 4 smartphone, also known as the LG Nexus 4 or LG Mako, was released in November 2012 and manufactured by LG. It was the first Android device that used Android 4.2 Jelly Bean update version. Nexus 4 is the first Nexus device to have wireless charging capabilities. It was updated to Android 4.3 in June 2013 and to Android 4.4 in November 2013. It can run Android 5.1 as of April 2015. The Nexus 4 has the following characteristics:

- Display: 4.7" Corning Gorilla Glass 2, True HD IPS Plus capacitive touchscreen, 768×1280 pixel resolution, 16M colors
- CPU: Quad-core 1.5 GHz Krait
- Chipset: Qualcomm Snapdragon APQ8064
- Storage: 8 or 16 GB
- RAM: 2 GB
- GPU: Adreno 320
- Battery: Non-removable Li-Po 2100 mAh battery, wireless charging
- Camera: 8 MP rear camera with 3264×2448 pixels, autofocus, and LED flash; 1.3 MP front camera

==== Nexus 5 ====
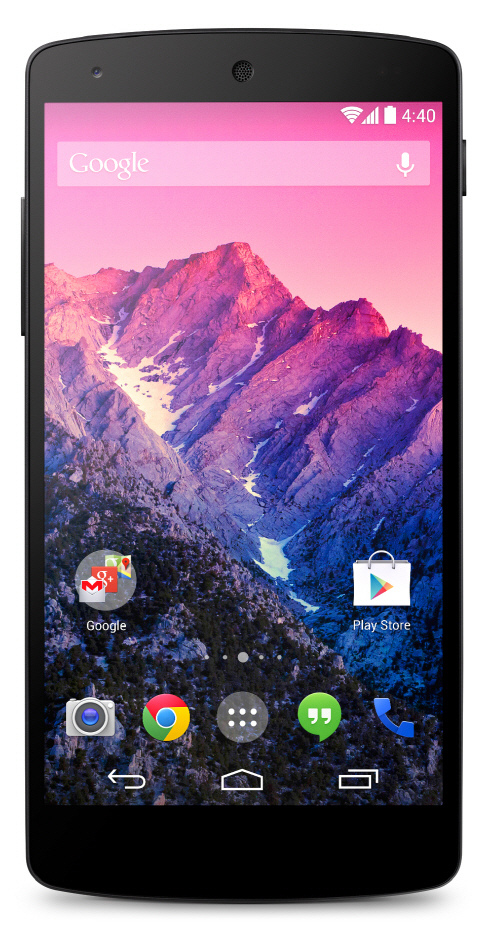
Nexus 5

The Nexus 5 smartphone, again manufactured by LG, was scheduled for sale on October 31, 2013, for US$349 at the Google Play store. It was the first device to run Android 4.4 KitKat. The Nexus 5 did not receive an official Android 7.0 Nougat update, meaning that Android 6.0.1 Marshmallow is the last officially supported Android version for the device. The Nexus 5 has the following characteristics:

- Display: 4.95" Corning Gorilla Glass 3, IPS LCD touchscreen, 1080×1920 pixel resolution (1080p)
- Processor: 2.26 GHz Krait 400 quad-core processor on a Qualcomm Snapdragon 800 SoC
- Storage: 16 or 32 GB
- RAM: 2 GB
- GPU: Adreno 330
- Battery: 2,300 mAh lithium polymer, wireless charging
- Cameras: 8 MP rear camera with optical image stabilization (OIS); 1.3 MP front camera
- Connectivity: 4G LTE, 802.11 a/b/g/n/ac Wi-Fi, Bluetooth 4.0
- Colors: Black, White, or Red

==== Nexus 6 ====
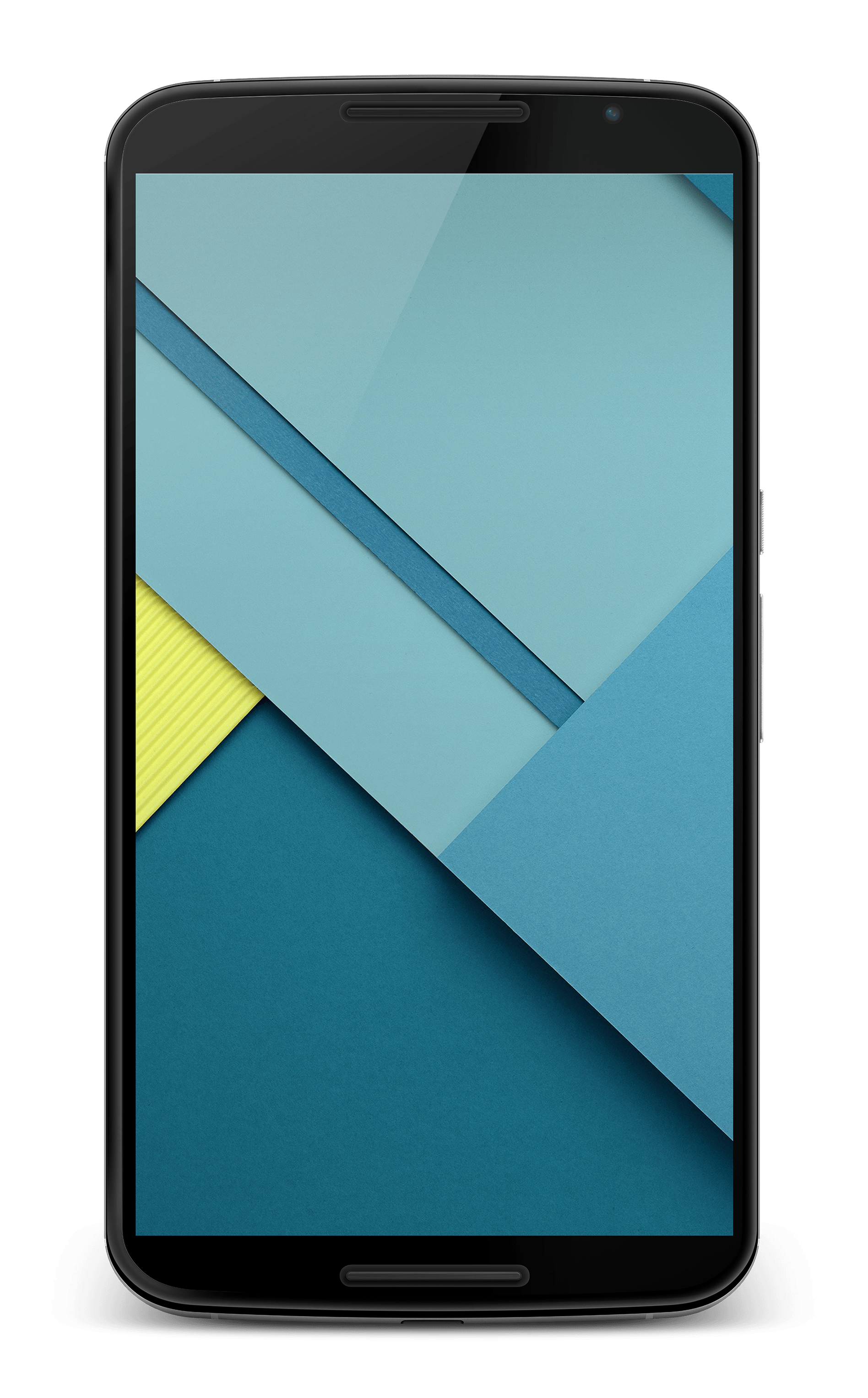
Nexus 6

The Nexus 6 is a smartphone developed by Motorola, originally running Android 5.0 Lollipop (upgradeable to Android 7.1.1 Nougat). It was first announced on October 15, 2014, along with the Nexus 9 and the Nexus Player.

- Display: 5.96" Quad HD AMOLED PenTile (RGBG) display with 1440×2560 pixel resolution (493 ppi)
- Processor: Qualcomm Snapdragon 805 - Quad-core 2.7 GHz
- Modem: Qualcomm MDM9625M
- Storage: 32 or 64 GB
- RAM: 3 GB
- GPU: Adreno 420
- Battery: 3220 mAh with Turbo Charging technology, non-removable, wired charging
- Cameras: 13 MP rear camera with f/2.0 lens featuring OIS; 2 MP front camera
- Speakers: Dual front facing stereo
- Colors: Midnight Blue and Cloud White

==== Nexus 5X ====
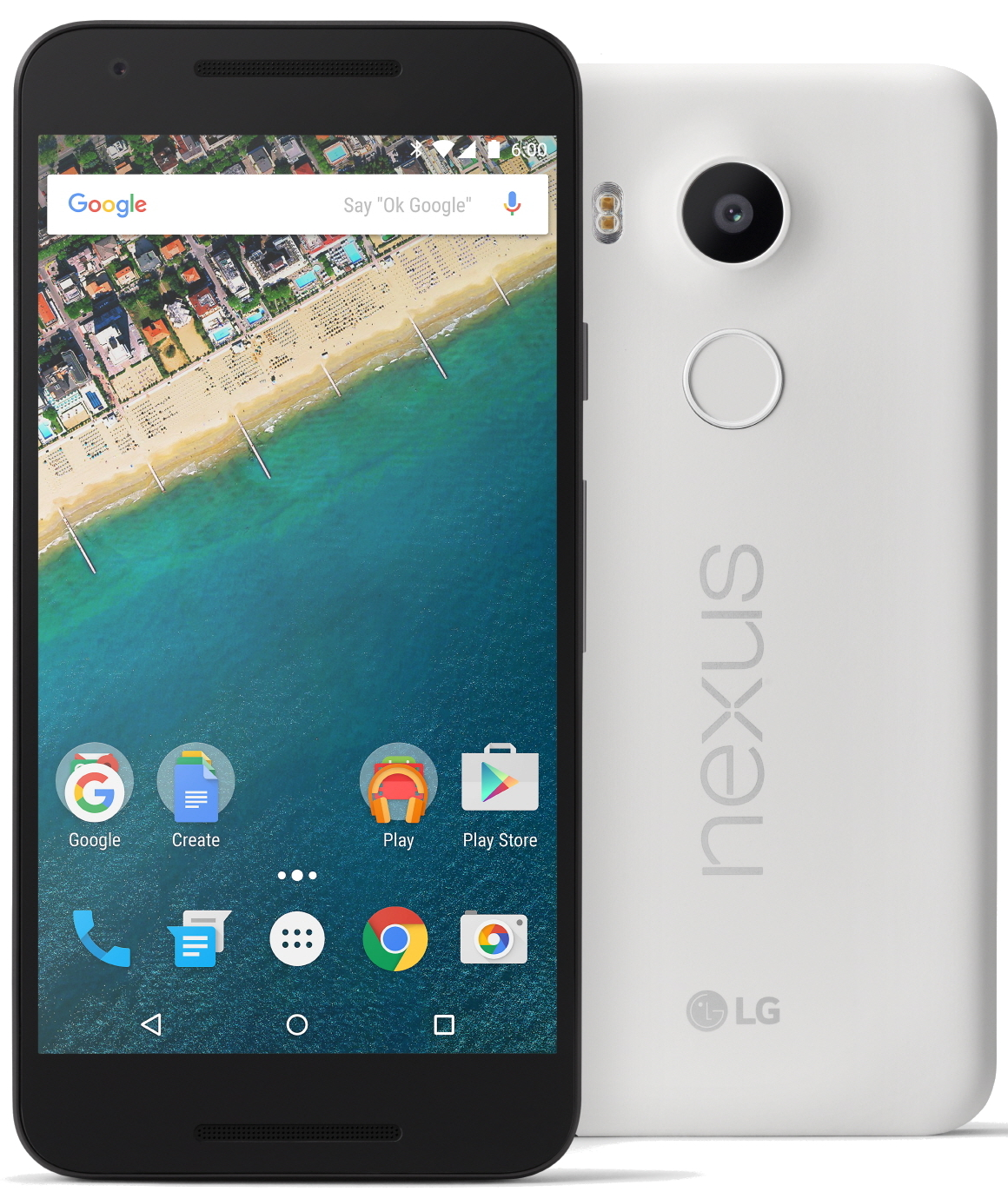
Nexus 5X

The Nexus 5X is a smartphone developed by LG originally running Android 6.0 Marshmallow (upgradeable to Android 8.1.0 Oreo). It was first announced on September 29, 2015, along with the Nexus 6P and several other Google devices (such as the Pixel C tablet).

- Display: 5.2" FHD liquid-crystal display with 1080×1920 pixel resolution (423ppi)
- Processor: Qualcomm Snapdragon 808 - Hexa-core 1.8 GHz
- Storage: 16 or 32 GB
- RAM: 2 GB LPDDR3
- GPU: Adreno 418
- Battery: 2700 mAh with rapid charging, non-removable
- Cameras: 12.3 MP rear camera with f/2.0 lens and IR laser-assisted autofocus; 5 MP front camera with f/2.0 lens
- Speakers: Single front-facing speaker
- Colors: Carbon (black), Quartz (white), and Ice (mint)

==== Nexus 6P ====
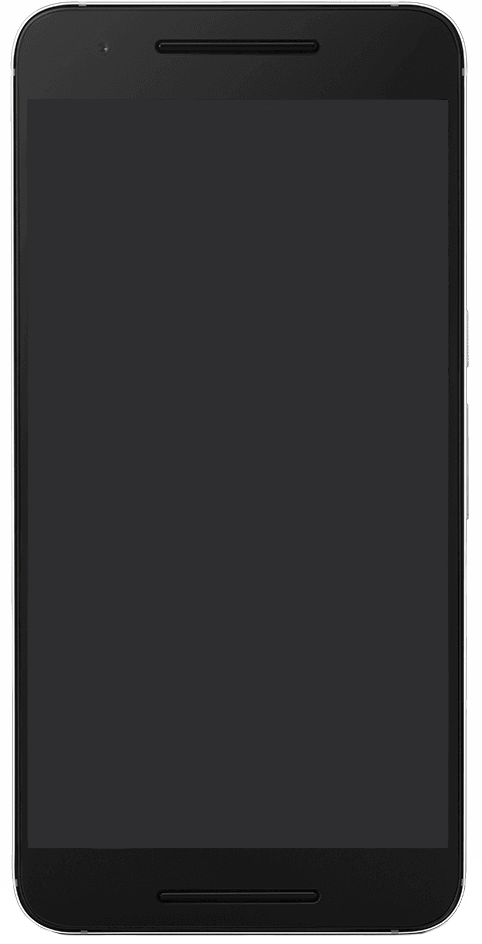
Nexus 6P

The Nexus 6P is a smartphone developed by Huawei originally running Android 6.0 Marshmallow. It was first announced on September 29, 2015, along with the Nexus 5X and several other Google devices (such as the Pixel C tablet).

- Display: 5.7" WQHD AMOLED display with 1440×2560 pixel resolution (518ppi)
- Processor: Qualcomm Snapdragon 810 - Octa-core 4 × 1.95 GHz, 4 × 1.55 GHz
- Storage: 32, 64, or 128 GB
- RAM: 3 GB LPDDR4
- GPU: Adreno 430
- Battery: 3450 mAh with rapid charging, non-removable
- Cameras: 12.3 MP rear camera with f/2.0 lens and IR laser-assisted autofocus; 8 MP front camera with f/2.0 lens
- Speakers: Dual front-facing stereo
- Colors: Aluminum, Graphite, Frost, or Gold

=== Tablets ===
==== Nexus 7 ====
===== First generation =====
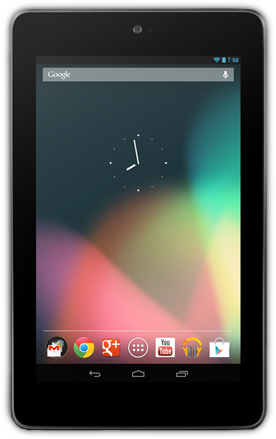
Nexus 7 (2012)

On June 27, 2012, at the I/O 2012 keynote presentation, Google introduced the Nexus 7, a 7-inch tablet computer developed and manufactured by Asus. Released in July 2012, it was the first device to run Android 4.1 Jelly Bean. The latest Android version supported by Google for the device is Android 5.1.1 Lollipop.

- Display: 7" display with 1280×800 pixel resolution
- SoC: Nvidia Tegra 3
- CPU: 1.2 GHz quad-core Cortex-A9
- Storage: 8, 16, or 32 GB
- RAM: 1 GB
- GPU: ULP GeForce
- Battery: 4325 mAh (non-removable)

===== Second generation =====
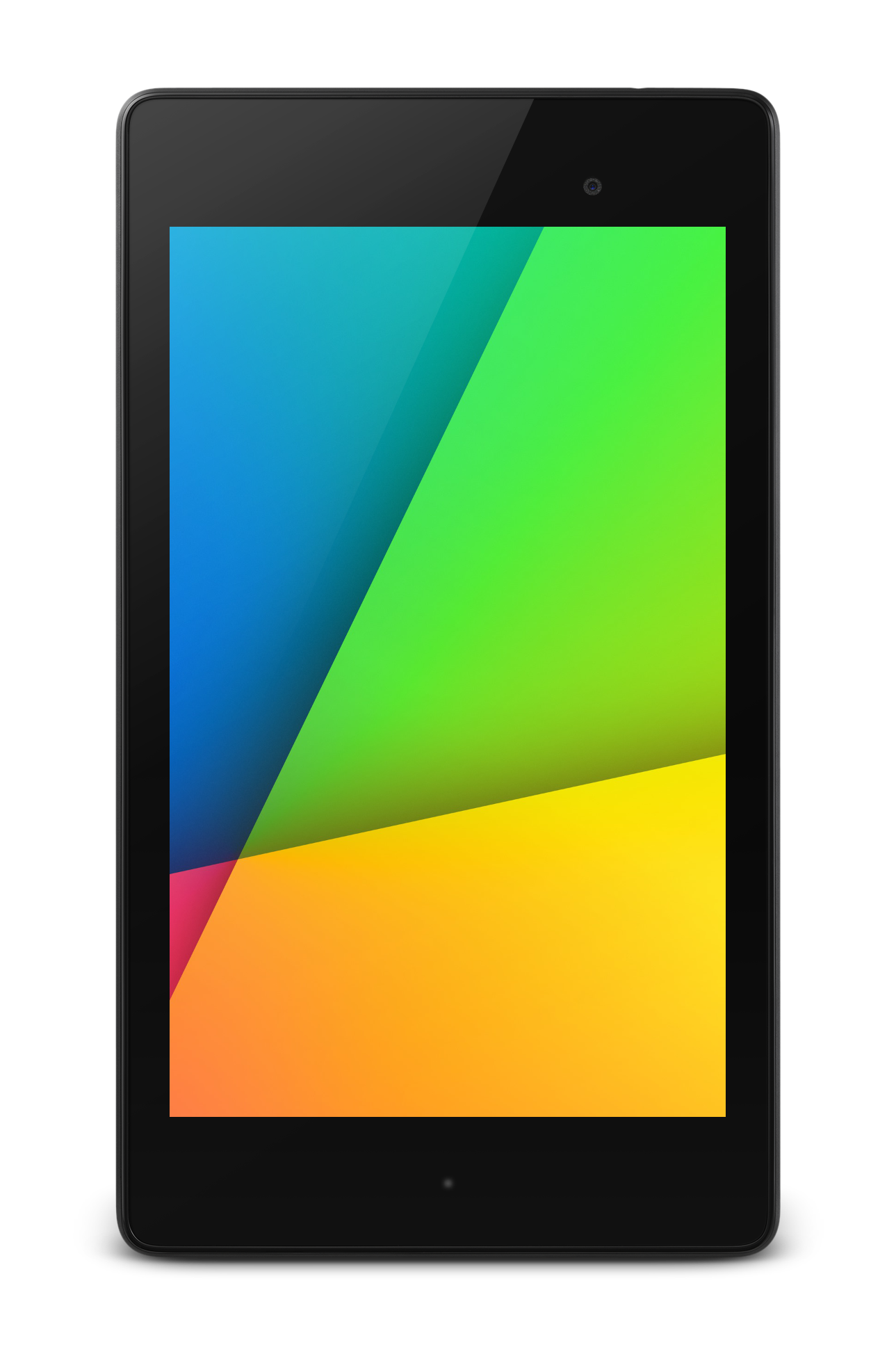
Nexus 7 (2013)

On July 24, 2013, at Google's "Breakfast with Sundar Pichai" press conference, Pichai introduced the second generation Nexus 7, again co-developed with Asus. Keeping with Google Nexus tradition, it was simultaneously released with the latest version, Android 4.3 Jelly Bean. It was made available on July 26, 2013, at select retailers and on the Google Play store in the United States. On November 20, 2013, it was available from the Google Play stores in Hong Kong and India. On the same day, the Nexus Wireless Charger was made available in the United States and Canada. In December 2015, Google released Android 6.0.1 Marshmallow for the device. The Nexus 7 (2013) will not receive an official Android 7.0 Nougat update, meaning that Android 6.0.1 Marshmallow is the last officially supported Android version for the tablet.

- Display: 7.02" display with 1920×1200 pixel resolution
- Chipset: Qualcomm Snapdragon S4 Pro
- CPU: 1.51 GHz quad-core Krait 300
- Storage: 16 or 32 GB
- RAM: 2 GB
- GPU: 400 MHz quad-core Adreno 320
- Battery: 3950 mAh (non-removable)

==== Nexus 10 ====
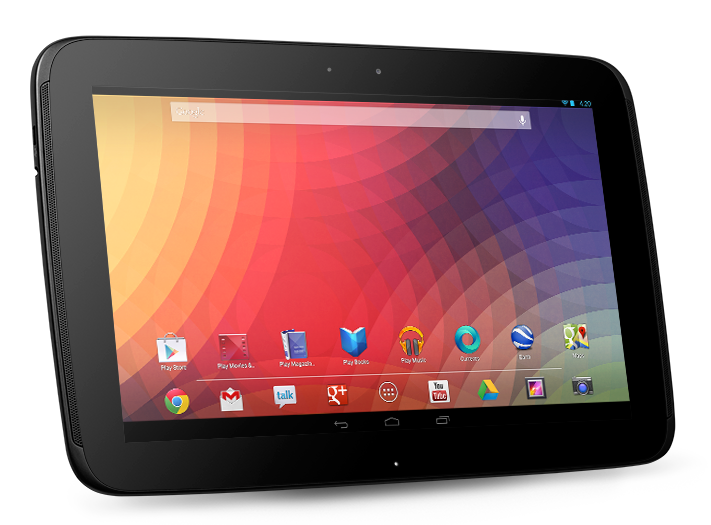
Nexus 10

The Nexus 10, a 10.1-inch tablet manufactured by Samsung, was revealed in late October 2012 by the Exif data of photos taken by Google executive, Vic Gundotra, along with the leaks of its manual and a comprehensive series of photos. The leaked photos revealed a design similar to the Samsung Galaxy Note 10.1, with a 10.1-inch 2560×1600 display, 16 or 32 GB of storage, Android 4.2, and a dual-core 1.7 GHz Exynos 5 processor. The Nexus 10 was expected to be unveiled officially during a Google press event on October 29, 2012, but the event was postponed due to Hurricane Sandy. The Nexus 10 would not receive any official updates beyond Android 5.1.1.

- Display: 10.1" Corning Gorilla Glass 2 with 2560×1600 pixel resolution
- CPU: 1.7 GHz dual-core Cortex-A15
- Chipset: Samsung Exynos 5250
- Storage: 16 or 32 GB
- RAM: 2 GB
- GPU: Mali-T604 MP4

==== Nexus 9 ====
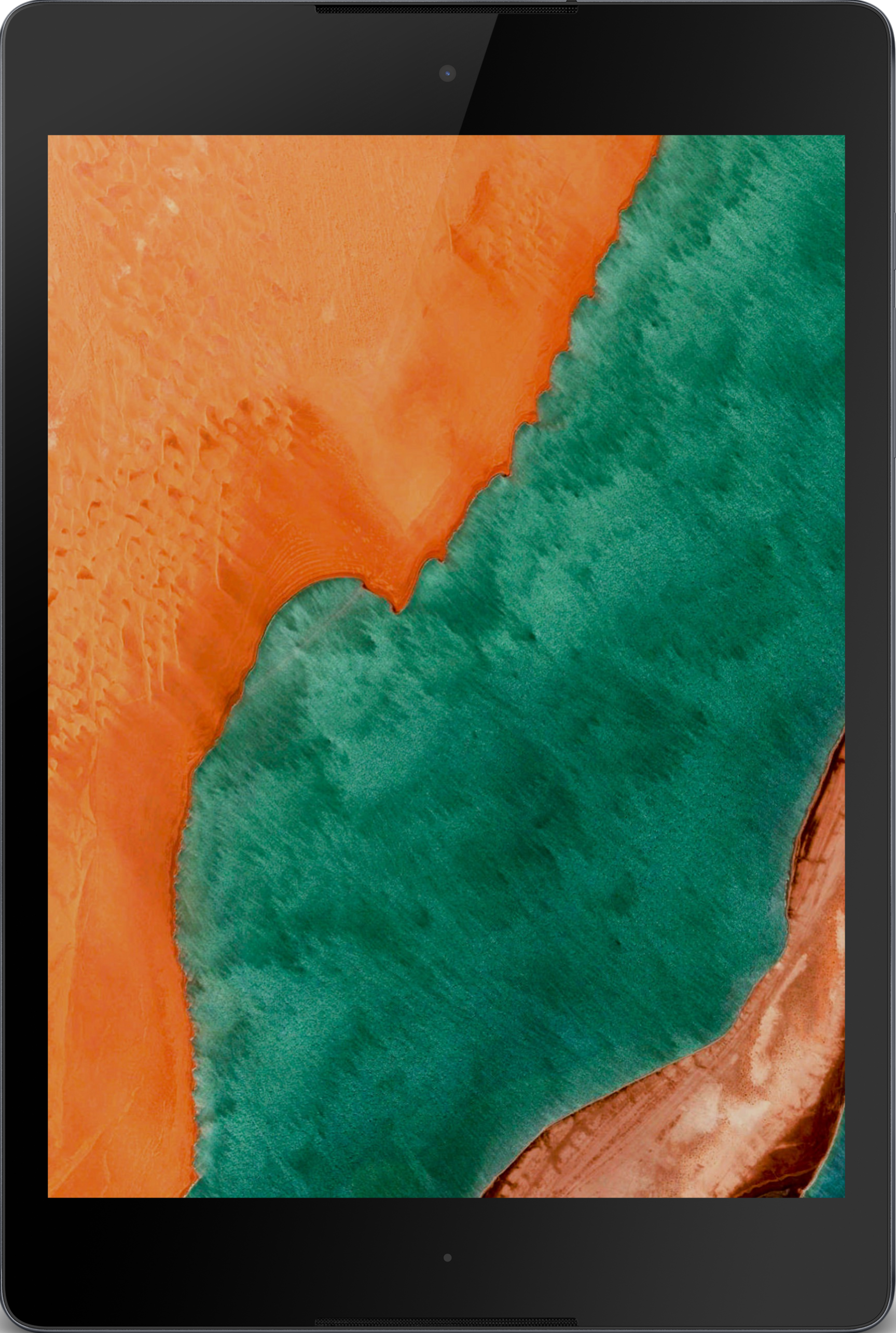
Nexus 9

The Nexus 9 is an 8.9-inch tablet running Android 5.0 Lollipop, developed in collaboration between Google and HTC. It was first announced on October 15, 2014, along with the Nexus 6 and the Nexus Player.

- Display: 8.9" Corning Gorilla Glass 3 with 2048×1536 pixel resolution
- CPU: 2.3 GHz dual-core 64-bit Nvidia Tegra K1 "Denver"
- Chipset: Nvidia Tegra K1
- Storage: 16 or 32 GB
- RAM: 2 GB
- Dual front-facing speakers featuring HTC BoomSound

=== Digital media players ===
==== Nexus Q ====
The Nexus Q is a discontinued digital media player that ran Android and integrated with Google Play, to sell at US$299 in the United States.

After complaints about a lack of features for the price, the Nexus Q was shelved indefinitely; Google said it needed time to make the product "even better". The Nexus Q was unofficially replaced by the Chromecast, and further by the Nexus Player.

- Storage: 16 GB
- RAM: 1 GB

==== Nexus Player ====
The Nexus Player is a streaming media player created in collaboration between Google and Asus. It is the first device running Android TV. It was first announced on October 15, 2014, along with the Nexus 6 and the Nexus 9. On May 24, 2016, Google discontinued sales of the Nexus Player. In March 2018, Google confirmed that the Nexus Player would not receive the upcoming version of Android, Android Pie, and that security updates had also ended for the device.

- 1.8 GHz quad-core Intel Atom processor
- 802.11ac 2x2 (MIMO)
- HDMI out
- Remote control (with 2 AAA batteries)
- Gamepad (Purchased separately)

== Philip K. Dick estate claim ==
Upon the announcement of the first Nexus device, the Nexus One, the estate of science fiction author Philip K. Dick claimed that the Nexus One name capitalized on intellectual property from Dick's 1968 novel Do Androids Dream of Electric Sheep? and that the choice of name was a direct reference to the Nexus-6 series of androids in the novel.

== See also ==
- Android Dev Phone
- Android One
- Google Play Edition
- Chromebook
- List of Google products
