= Moto X (2nd generation) =

Android smartphone developed by Motorola Mobility

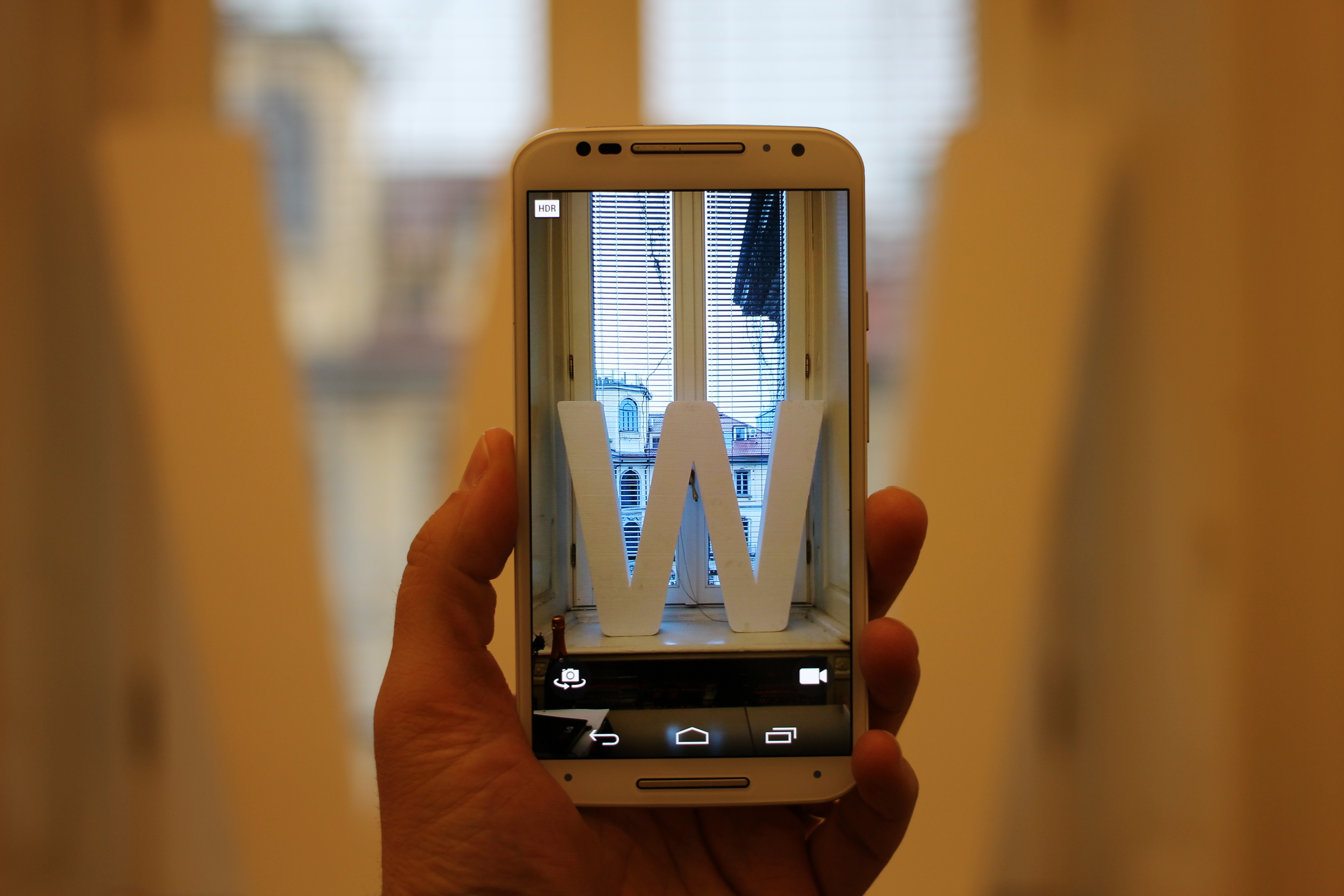
- Manufacturer: Motorola Mobility
- Type: Smartphone
- First released: September 5, 2014; 11 years ago
- Predecessor: Moto X (1st generation)
- Successor: Moto X Style
- Related: Moto G (2nd generation); Moto E (2nd generation); Nexus 6
- Form factor: Touchscreen Bar
- Dimensions: 140.8 mm (5.54 in) H 72.4 mm (2.85 in) W 9.9 mm (0.39 in) D
- Weight: 144 g (5.1 oz)
- Operating system: Original: Android 4.4.4 "KitKat"; Current: Android 6.0 "Marshmallow"
- CPU: 2.5 GHz quad-core ARM Qualcomm Snapdragon 801
- GPU: Adreno 330
- Memory: 2 GB RAM
- Storage: 16, 32, and 64 GB
- Battery: 2300 mAh Li-ion
- Rear camera: 13 MP, dual LED flash, 4K Video Recording, Slow Motion Recording
- Front camera: 2 MP HD recording up to 1080p resolution
- Display: 5.2" (132 mm) 1920 × 1080 pixel resolution Super AMOLED (423 ppi); Corning Gorilla Glass 3 with Native Damage Resistance (NDR)
- Sound: Front-facing mono speaker
- Connectivity: GPS, Wi-Fi, NFC, Bluetooth, USB, USB OTG, Miracast, Infrared motion sensors
- Website: Moto X 2nd Gen at the Wayback Machine (archived 2014-10-01)

The second generation Moto X, marketed as moto X and referred to in the media as Moto X (2014), is an Android smartphone developed by Motorola Mobility. Released on September 5, 2014, it is the successor to the original Moto X released in 2013. It was succeeded by the third generation Moto X Style and Play family, announced on July 29, 2015.

The second-generation model improves on the original model with a higher quality design incorporating a metal frame and optional leather or wood rear covers, along with improved internal specifications such as a quad-core processor and 1080p display.

== Specs ==
=== Hardware ===
The second-generation Moto X has a design similar to the previous model with a curved rear, but now features an aluminium frame, a front-facing mono speaker, and a set of infrared motion sensors. Its internal hardware was also upgraded, incorporating a 5.2-inch (130 mm) 1080p Super AMOLED pentile display, a 2.5 GHz Qualcomm Snapdragon 801 system-on-chip with 2 GB of RAM, a 13-megapixel rear camera with support for recording 4K resolution video and as well as slow-motion video, and 16, 32, or 64 GB of internal storage. The 13-megapixel rear-facing camera is encircled with a clear ring that houses its pair of LED flashes; the ring generates light refraction, which is intended to improve flash performance.

As with the previous model, users will be able to custom-order a Moto X with their choice of colors for the front cover glass (black or white), speaker/microphone grilles, and the rear cover—including plastic, wood, and, new for the second generation model, leather materials provided by the Horween Leather Company via Motorola's Motomaker website. in May 2014, Motorola announced it would close the Fort Worth plant it had used to construct Moto X smartphones domestically due to high operational costs. Similarly to the iPhone 4 and iPhone 4s, the frame of the phone serves as its antenna; the device optimizes antenna usage to ensure that it does not lose cellular reception if it is held in certain ways.

=== Software ===
The second generation Moto X ships with Android 4.4.4 "KitKat", using a mostly stock user experience with additional proprietary software features; the voice-activated personal assistant Moto Voice (formerly Touchless Control) now includes additional commands (such as those for launching selected apps, providing instructions for navigating to a location, toggling sleep mode by saying "Good morning", taking selfies, etc.) and the ability to change the spoken phrase used to open the assistant. The device's infrared sensors can be used for motion-activated gestures, such as invoking Moto Display (formerly Active Notifications) when the phone is sleeping, and for dismissing alarms and incoming calls. The camera software incorporates a "best shot" mode, a voice-activated shutter, along with a "Highlight Reel" generator.

An update to Android 5.0 "Lollipop" was released in November 2014. Android 5.0 Lollipop was released on November 3, 2014, to a somewhat rocky launch. Several bugs involving cell connection issues, wi-fi connection issues, premature battery drain, and severe app lag plagued the early adopters on Nexus, LG, and Motorola devices. Google quickly released a patch to fix what was thought to be the most pressing issues, bringing Lollipop to version 5.0.1. A new patch update (5.0.2) was later released to the Moto X.

In April 2015 an update to Android 5.1 was announced for XT1095 models. On November 12, 2015, Motorola started the rollout of its first Android 6.0 "Marshmallow" update for Moto X (2nd Gen) units in Brazil and India, following which OTA began rolling out in other countries.

== Reception ==
The second-generation Moto X has been critically praised by many reviewers. Dan Seifert of The Verge called the second generation Moto X “The best Android smartphone ever made”. Many reviewers also lauded the improved build and design of the phone in comparison to the first generation Moto X. Chris Velazco of Engadget writes that “The new Moto X feels a thousand times better than last year's model, and is easily the most comfortable phone current-gen smartphone I've picked up yet.” The phone's improved specifications in comparison to its predecessor, most notably the use of the Qualcomm Snapdragon 801 SoC and its 1080p FHD Super AMOLED panel (in contrast to the 2013 Moto X's 720p HD display) addressing the previous criticisms that the Moto X was under-powered compared to other 2013 flagship devices.

Many reviews also commended the Moto X's software for speedy performance and useful additions to Google's stock Android operating system.

Criticisms of the phone primarily focused on the phone's mediocre camera image quality and battery life when compared to other 2014 flagship smartphones.

== Variants ==
The 2nd Gen Moto X has several variants to support 3G and 4G networks of different carriers:

Model	FCC ID	Carriers/Regions	CDMA bands	GSM bands	UMTS bands	LTE bands	Notes
XT1085		China	800	Quad	850/900/1900/2100	1/3/7/20/38/39/40/41	Unlocked for Chinese Carriers
XT1092	IHDT56QA3	Europe, Asia	N/A	Quad	850/900/1800/1900/2100	1/3/7/8/20	SIM unlocked
XT1093		U.S. Cellular U.S.	800/850/1900	Quad	850/900/1800/1900/2100	2/4/5/12/17/25	SIM locked
XT1094	IHDT56QA3	Republic Wireless	800/850/1900	Quad	850/900/1800/1900/2100	2/4/5/12/17/25/26/41	Carrier locked; SIM locked; ROM incompatible with other carriers
XT1095	IHDT56QA1	GSM unlocked U.S. "Pure Edition" France (maybe Europe ?)	N/A	Quad	850/900/1700/1900/2100	2/3/4/5/7/17	SIM unlocked and compatible with most GSM networks including AT&T and T-Mobile US; LTE bands software restricted to 2/4/17, 3/5/7 enabled with Lollipop OTA; Ships with a T-Mobile US SIM
XT1096	IHDT56QA2	Verizon U.S.	850/1900	Quad	850/900/1900/2100	2/3/4/7/13	
XT1097	IHDT56QA1	AT&T U.S., Retail Canada, Telus Canada, Retail Brazil, Nextel Brazil and most Latin American carriers	N/A	Quad	850/900/1700/1900/2100	2/3/4/5/7/17/29	The AT&T variant doesn't support LTE band 29 (software restricted) and is SIM locked whereas the non-U.S. variants are SIM unlocked

All variants support the four 2G GSM bands 850/900/1800/1900.

Motorola has stated that there will not be a version for Sprint in the U.S.
