= Moto X Play =

Android smartphone developed by Motorola Mobility

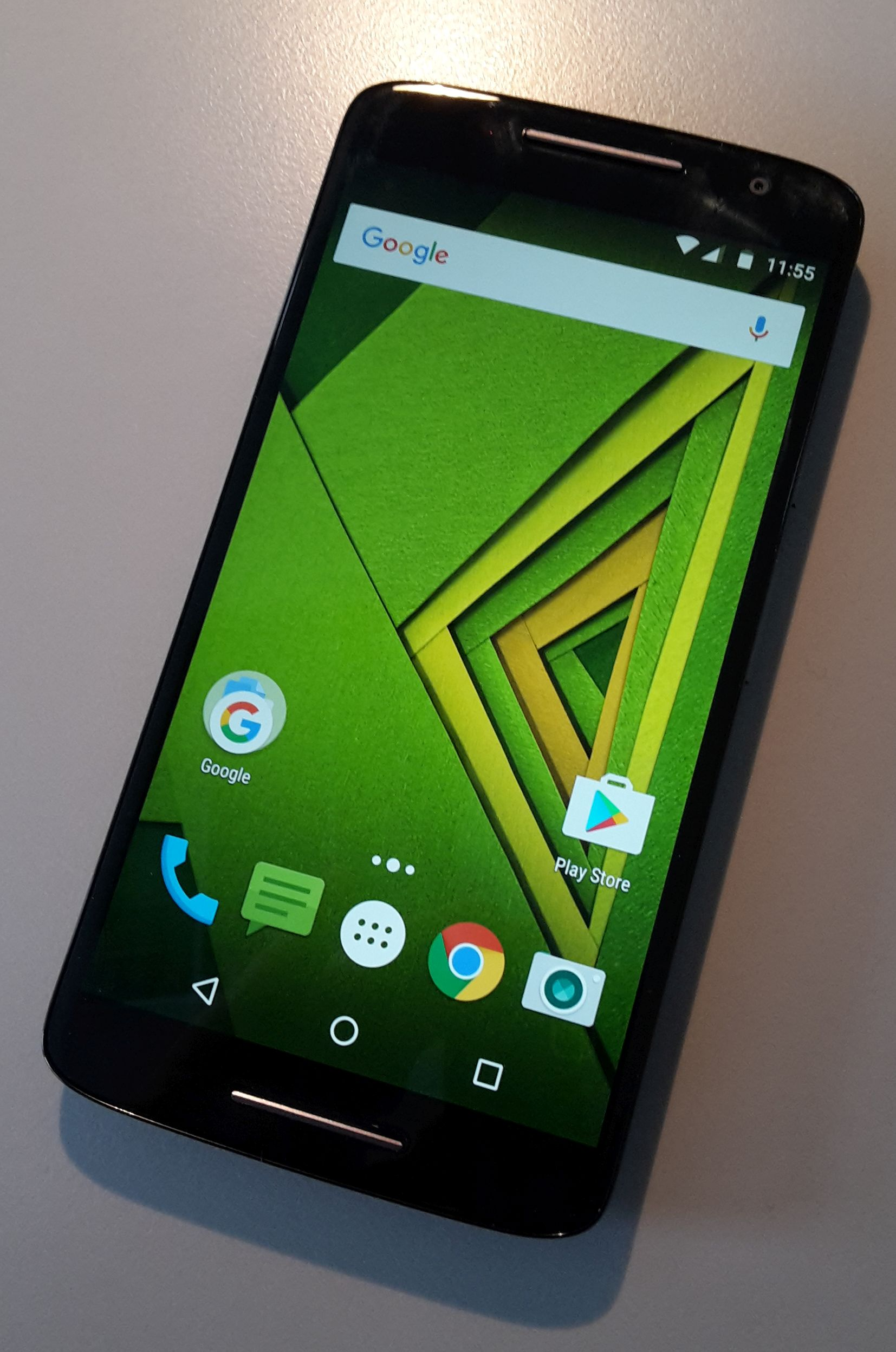
- Manufacturer: Motorola Mobility
- Type: Phablet
- Series: Motorola Moto
- Predecessor: Droid Maxx
- Successor: Moto X4; Moto Z Play; Moto Z2 Play
- Related: Moto X Style; Moto X Force/Droid Turbo 2 Moto G (3rd generation)
- Form factor: Slate
- Dimensions: 148 mm (5.8 in) H 75 mm (3.0 in) W 10.9 mm (0.43 in) D
- Weight: 169 g (6.0 oz)
- Operating system: Original: Android 5.1.1 "Lollipop"; Current: Android 7.1.1 Nougat
- System-on-chip: Qualcomm Snapdragon 615
- CPU: 1.7 GHz octa-core ARM Cortex-A53 (64-bit)
- GPU: Adreno 405
- Memory: 2 GB LPDDR3 RAM
- Storage: 16 or 32 GB
- Removable storage: microSDXC up to 128 GB
- Battery: 3630 mAh Li-Po, non-removable
- Charging: TurboPower fast charging
- Rear camera: 21 MP Sony Exmor IMX230, f/2.0 aperture, dual CCT flash, 1080p video recording @ 30fps, slow motion
- Front camera: 5 MP
- Display: 5.5" (140 mm) 1080 × 1920 pixel (403 ppi) IPS LCD
- Sound: Mono speaker
- Website: Official website

Moto X Play is an Android smartphone developed by Motorola Mobility, a subsidiary of Lenovo. Unveiled on July 28, 2015, it was one of three devices that succeeded the second-generation Moto X. In contrast to the high-end Moto X Style, the Play is a mid-range device distinguished by its high battery capacity.

It was released in Canada, Europe, and Latin America in August 2015. In the United States, it was unveiled in October 2015 as the Droid Maxx 2, as part of the Droid line of smartphones that are manufactured by Motorola exclusively for Verizon Wireless.

== Specifications ==
=== Design ===
The Moto X Play's chassis features a faux metallic bezel and a textured rear cover, and is splash-resistant. The phone has a 5.5 inch display with sizable bezels; the upper bezel houses the front-facing camera and a speaker/earpiece grill while the lower bezel houses a speaker grill. On the side frame; there is a power button and a volume rocker at the right, a SIM/microSD card tray and a 3.5 mm headphone jack at the top, and a microUSB 2.0 port at the bottom; the left side is empty. At the back, there is the rear-facing camera, the LED flash and a "Motorola" logo. When purchasing the phone it was possible to choose the colour of the microphone and speaker inserts, new central area on the back around the camera and flash and the rear cover from a range of colours and finishes. The rear cover can be removed and replaced with differently-colored versions to customize the phone; no other user-replaceable parts are present under the cover as the battery is non-removable.

=== Hardware ===
Moto X Play is powered by the Qualcomm Snapdragon 615 system-on-chip with a 1.7 GHz octa-core ARM Cortex-A53 64-bit CPU and an Adreno 405 GPU. The phone features a 5.5-inch 1080p IPS LCD with 1080x1920 pixels resolution, 16:9 aspect ratio and 424 ppi pixel density. It is available with 2 GB of RAM and 16 or 32 GB of internal storage expandable via microSD card. The Moto X Play includes a non-removable 3630 mAh battery, which Motorola rated as providing 48 hours of mixed usage on a single charge. It also features a 21-megapixel rear-facing camera and a 5-megapixel front-facing camera with wide-angle lens.

=== Software ===
The Moto X Play shipped with Android 5.1.1 "Lollipop", customized with Motorola's suite of apps including Moto Display, Moto Voice, and Moto Assist. In January 2016, Motorola began to release an update to Android 6.0 "Marshmallow". It enables new features such as "Google Now on Tap", which allows users to perform searches within the context of information currently being displayed on-screen, and "Doze", which optimizes battery usage when the device is not being physically handled. An update to Android 7.1.1 "Nougat" was released in June 2017 for international models and February 2018 for U.S. Droid Maxx 2 models.

== Variants ==
The Moto X Play has several variants to support 3G and 4G networks of different carriers:

Model	FCC ID	Regions	CDMA bands	GSM bands	UMTS bands	LTE bands	Notes
XT1561		China	Unknown	Quad	Unknown	Unknown	Unlocked for Chinese Carriers
XT1562		Europe, Australia, India	N/A	Quad	850/900/1800/1900/2100	1/3/5/7/8/19/20/28/38/40/41	SIM unlocked
XT1563		Canada, Brazil and most Latin American carriers	N/A	Quad	850/900/1700(AWS)/1800/1900/2100	1/2/3/4/5/7/8/12/17/28	

All variants support the four 2G GSM bands 850/900/1800/1900.

== Reception ==
The Verge considered the Moto X Play to be a "more perfect Nexus 5" due to its balance of capabilities and value, and arguing that its camera was one of the best seen on a Motorola to date (although struggling in low-light conditions), but noting that the software on their device appeared to have performance issues.

NotebookCheck was generally positive about the device. The rear camera image quality, the display quality and the battery life were praised. It was concluded that the Moto X Play could "easily cope with 99% of all everyday situations, apps and games" but some of the opponents such as OnePlus 2 had more "computing power".

Mobile Syrup gave Moto X Play an average review citing poor build quality and as it "it feels closer to a higher-spec Moto G than it does to a whittled-down Moto X Style", and was also critical about the Moto X Style's absence from the Canadian market.

Preceded by Moto X (2014)	Moto X Play; 2015	Succeeded by Moto X4
