= Comparison of Google Nexus smartphones =

The following is a comparative list of smartphones belonging to the Google Nexus line of devices, using the Android operating system.

Model	Nexus One	Nexus S	Galaxy Nexus	Nexus 4	Nexus 5	Nexus 6	Nexus 5X	Nexus 6P
Status	Discontinued, unsupported							
Manufacturer	HTC	Samsung		LG		Motorola Mobility	LG	Huawei
Model Codename	Passion	Crespo / crespo4g	Maguro/Toro/Toroplus	Mako	Hammerhead	Shamu	Bullhead	Angler
ROM Codename	passion / passion_vf	soju / sojua / sojuk /sojus	yakju / takju / mysid /micacea	occam	Hammerhead	Shamu	Bullhead	Angler
Released	January 2010	December 2010	October 2011	October 2012	October 2013	October 2014	October 2015	
Discontinued	July 19, 2010	May 24, 2012 (Sprint) June 8, 2012 (Mobilicity)	October 29, 2012 (Google Play Store)	November 1, 2013 (Google Play Store)	March 12, 2015	December 9, 2015	October 4, 2016	
Image								
Android version	2.1 Eclair	2.3 Gingerbread	4.0.1 Ice Cream Sandwich	4.2 Jelly Bean	4.4 KitKat	5.0 Lollipop	6.0 Marshmallow	
Upgradable to	2.3.6 Gingerbread	4.1.2 Jelly Bean	4.3 Jelly Bean	5.1.1 Lollipop	6.0.1 Marshmallow	7.1.1 Nougat	8.1 Oreo	
Last updated	September 2011	October 2012	July 2013	April 2015	October 2015	January 2017	December 2017	
Cellular frequencies	GSM 850/900/1800/1900 MHz; UMTS 850/1900/2100 MHz or 900/1700/2100 MHz	GSM 850/900/1800/1900 MHz; UMTS 900/1700/2100 MHz or 850/1900/2100 MHz; CDMA2000 (4G version)	GSM 850/900/1800/1900 MHz; UMTS 850/900/1700/1900/2100 MHz; LTE 1900 MHz (LTE-only version)	GSM 850/900/1800/1900 MHz; UMTS 850/900/1700/1900/2100 MHz; LTE 1700 MHz hardware (disabled in software)	GSM 850/900/1800/1900 MHz; UMTS 850/900/1700/1900/2100 MHz; LTE (US) bands: 1/2/4/5/17/19/25/26/41	GSM 850/900/1800/1900 MHz; LTE(US) bands: 2/3/4/5/7/12/13/17/25/26/29/41 CA DL bands: B2-B13, B2-B17, B2-29, B4-B5, B4-B13, B4-B17, B4-B29	GSM 850/900/1800/1900 MHz; LTE(US) bands: 1/2/3/4/5/7/10/12/13/17/25/26/29/41 CA DL bands: B2-B2, B2-B4, B2-B5, B2-B12, B2-B13, B2-B17, B2-B29, B4-B4, B4-B5, B4-B7, B4-12, B4-B13, B4-B17, B4-B29, B41-B41	GSM 850/900/1800/1900 MHz; LTE(US) bands: 2/3/4/5/7/10/12/13/17/25/26/29/30/41 CA DL bands: B2-B2, B2-B4, B2-B5, B2-B12, B2-B13, B2-B17, B2-B29, B4-B4, B4-B5, B4-B13, B4-B17, B4-B29, B41-B41
Data speeds	GPRS Class 10; HSUPA 2 Mbit/s; HSDPA 7.2 Mbit/s	HSUPA 5.76 Mbit/s; HSDPA 7.2 Mbit/s; WiMAX (4G version)	HSUPA 5.76 Mbit/s; HSDPA 21 Mbit/s	HSDPA 42 Mbit/s; HSPA+ DC-HSPA+				
Size	119 mm (4.7 in) H 59.8 mm (2.35 in) W 11.5 mm (0.45 in) D	123.9 mm (4.88 in) H 63.0 mm (2.48 in) W 10.8 mm (0.43 in) D	135.5 mm (5.33 in) H 67.94 mm (2.675 in) W 8.94 mm (0.352 in) D 9.47 mm (0.373 in) D (LTE version)	133.9 mm (5.27 in) H 68.7 mm (2.70 in) W 9.1 mm (0.36 in) D	137.84 mm (5.427 in) H 69.17 mm (2.723 in) W 8.59 mm (0.338 in) D	159.26 mm (6.270 in) H 82.98 mm (3.267 in) W 10.06 mm (0.396 in) D	147.0 mm (5.79 in) H 72.6 mm (2.86 in) W 7.9 mm (0.31 in) D	159.3 mm (6.27 in) H 77.8 mm (3.06 in) W 7.3 mm (0.29 in) D
Weight	130 g (4.6 oz)	129.0 g (4.55 oz) (AMOLED version); 140.0 g (4.94 oz) (Super-Clear LCD version)	135 g (4.8 oz)	139 g (4.9 oz)	130 g (4.6 oz)	184 g (6.5 oz)	136 g (4.8 oz)	178 g (6.3 oz)
Chipset	Qualcomm Snapdragon 8250	Samsung Exynos 3	Texas Instruments OMAP 4460	Qualcomm Snapdragon S4 Pro	Qualcomm Snapdragon 800	Qualcomm Snapdragon 805	Qualcomm Snapdragon 808	Qualcomm Snapdragon 810
Processor	1 GHz Qualcomm Scorpion	1 GHz single-core ARM Cortex-A8	1.2 GHz dual-core ARM Cortex-A9	1.5 GHz quad-core Qualcomm Krait 200	2.26 GHz quad-core Qualcomm Krait 400	2.65 GHz quad-core Qualcomm Krait 450	1.8 GHz hexa core 64-bit ARMv8-A	2.0 GHz octa core 64-bit ARMv8-A
Graphics	Qualcomm Adreno 200 @ 133 MHz	PowerVR SGX540 @ 200 MHz	PowerVR SGX540 @ 384 MHz	Qualcomm Adreno 320 @ 400 MHz	Qualcomm Adreno 330 @ 450 MHz	Qualcomm Adreno 420 @ 600 MHz	Adreno 418	Adreno 430
Memory	512 MB LPDDR		1 GB LPDDR2	2 GB LPDDR2	2 GB LPDDR3	3 GB LPDDR3	2 GB LPDDR3	3 GB LPDDR4
Storage	512 MB + expandable SD	16 GB iNAND (partitioned 1 GB internal storage)	16 or 32 GB	8 or 16 GB	16 or 32 GB	32 or 64 GB	16 or 32 GB	32 or 64 or 128 GB
Expandable storage	microSDHC slot (up to 32 GB card supported)	—N/a						
New connectivity	3.5 mm TRRS; A-GPS; Bluetooth v2.1 + EDR micro USB 2.0; Wi-Fi IEEE 802.11b/g/n	NFC	DLNA; USB On-The-Go; MHL; Bluetooth 3.0 (Bluetooth 4.0 compatible hardware); Wi-Fi 802.11a/b/g/n	SlimPort; Miracast; Bluetooth 4.0; Qi wireless charging Removes USB On-The-Go; Removes MHL in favor of SlimPort	802.11a/b/g/n/ac USB On-The-Go	removes SlimPort	USB-C removes Qi wireless charging	
WLAN/BT	Broadcom BCM4329	Broadcom BCM4329	Broadcom BCM4330	Qualcomm	Broadcom BCM4339	Broadcom BCM4354	Qualcomm QCA6174	Broadcom BCM4358
GPS	Qualcomm	?	CSR GSD4T 9600	Qualcomm	Qualcomm	?	?	?
NFC	—N/a	NXP PN544	NXP PN65N	BCM20793S	BCM20793M	BCM20795	NXP PN548	
Power	1,400 mAh; User-replaceable lithium-ion battery	1,500 mAh; User-replaceable lithium-ion battery	1,750 mAh (HSPA+ version); 1,850 mAh (LTE version); User-replaceable battery	2,100 mAh; Non-user-replaceable lithium polymer battery, Wireless charging	2,300 mAh; Non-user-replaceable lithium polymer battery	3,220 mAh; Non-user-replaceable lithium polymer battery with Turbo Charging technology	2,700 mAh	3,450 mAh
Face buttons	Capacitive touch-sensitive buttons		On-screen buttons					
New features	Multi-touch capacitive touchscreen 3-axis accelerometer A-GPS; Ambient light sensor Microphone; Digital compass Proximity sensor Trackball	Digital compass Wi-Fi hotspot USB tethering Oleophobic display coating SIP VoIP Removes trackball	Barometer; 3-axis digital compass Dual microphones for active noise cancellation Wi-Fi Direct; Oleophobic display coating	Wireless charging Crystal Reflection Glass back Gorilla Glass 2 DC-HSPA+	LTE, 802.11 a/b/g/n/ac Wi-Fi; Composite step detector and step counter Gorilla Glass 3 Removes Crystal Reflection Glass back	Dual front-facing speakers on long axis	Fingerprint Sensor Removes Dual front-facing speakers on long axis	Fingerprint Sensor; Dual front facing speakers on long axis
Display	At launch: AMOLED; Later: SuperLCD; 3.7 in (94 mm); 480×800 px (254 ppi); 9:15 aspect ratio 24-bit color 100,000:1 contrast ratio 1 ms response time	4.0 in (100 mm) Super AMOLED PenTile or Super Clear LCD (GT-i9023); 480×800 px (233 ppi); 9:15 aspect ratio	4.65 in (118 mm) HD Super AMOLED PenTile; 720×1280 px (316 ppi); 9:16 aspect ratio 10 μs response time	4.7 in (120 mm) "TrueHD+" IPS; 768x1280 px (320 ppi); 9:15 aspect ratio	4.95 in (126 mm) "TrueHD+" IPS; 1080×1920 px (445 ppi); 9:16 aspect ratio	5.96 in (151 mm) AMOLED PenTile; 1440x2560 px (493 ppi); 9:16 aspect ratio	5.2 in (130 mm) LCD; 1080×1920 px (423 ppi); 9:16 aspect ratio	5.7 in (140 mm) AMOLED; 1440x2560 px (518 ppi); 9:16 aspect ratio
Rear camera	5 MP (2,560×1,920); 480p (720×480) video recording @ 20 fps or higher LED flash	5 MP (2,560×1,920); LED flash	5 MP (2,592×1,936); 1080p (1920×1080) video recording @ 24 fps LED flash Zero shutter lag	8 MP (3,264×2,448) back-side illuminated sensor 1080p (1920×1080) video recording @ 30 fps LED flash	8 MP (3,264×2,448) sensor 1080p (1920×1080) video recording @ 30 fps LED flash Optical image stabilization	13 MP sensor Optical image stabilization Dual LED ring flash f/2.0 aperture 4K video capture at 30 fps	12.3 MP, F2.0, laser autofocus	
Front camera	—N/a	0.3 MP (640×480)	1.3 MP; 720p (1280x720) video recording @ 30 fps			2 MP	5 MP	8 MP
SIM card format	Mini-SIM			Micro-SIM		Nano-SIM		
Media formats	Audio AAC, AAC+, eAAC+, AMR-NB, AMR-WB, MP3, MIDI, Ogg, WAV; Image BMP, GIF, JPEG, PNG; Video H.263, H.264, MPEG-4 SP	Audio AAC, AAC+, eAAC+, AMR, AMR-NB, MP3, Ogg; Video H.264, H.263, MPEG-4, VP8	Audio AAC, AAC+, eAAC+, AC3, FLAC, MP3, Vorbis, WAV; Video H.263, H.264, MP4, WebM	Audio AAC, AAC+, eAAC+, MIDI, MP3, WAV; Video H.263, H.264, MP4		?	?	?
References								

== See also ==
- Comparison of Google Pixel smartphones
- Comparison of Google Nexus tablets
- Comparison of Samsung Galaxy S smartphones
- List of Google Play edition devices
- Pixel (smartphone)
