= Droid Turbo 2 =

Android smartphone developed by Motorola Mobility

Droid Turbo 2 (US) / Moto X Force (global)
- Manufacturer: Motorola Mobility
- Type: Phablet
- Series: Droid
- First released: October 27, 2015; 10 years ago
- Availability by region: United States October 30, 2015 Verizon Wireless
- Predecessor: Droid Turbo
- Successor: Moto X4; Moto Z Force
- Related: Moto X Style; Moto X Play; Moto G (3rd generation)
- Compatible networks: 4G LTE (Cat 4), CDMA/EVDO Rev A, UMTS/HSPA+, GSM/EDGE
- Form factor: Slate
- Dimensions: Height: 149.8 mm (5.90 in.) width: 78 mm (3.07 in.) curve: 7.6–9.2 mm (.30–.36 in.)
- Weight: 169 g 6 oz
- Operating system: Original: Android 5.1.1 "Lollipop"; Last: Android 7.0 "Nougat"
- System-on-chip: Snapdragon 810
- CPU: MSM8994 (Snapdragon 810)
- GPU: Adreno 430
- Memory: 3 GB
- Storage: 32 GB, 64 GB
- Removable storage: MicroSD (HC, XC), up to 128 GB
- Battery: 3760 mAH
- Rear camera: 2286
- Front camera: 5 MP
- Display: 5.4", 2560×1440
- Sound: Front ported loud speaker
- Connectivity: NFC, Bluetooth 4.1, Quad Band GSM, CDMA
- Data inputs: Touchscreen, accelerometer, ambient light, gyroscope, hall effect, Infrared, magnetometer, proximity
- Model: XT1585; X Force XT1580; Moto X Force Dual Sim XT1581
- Other: Nano-SIM format, Supports PMA and Qi wireless charging, Micro USB, 3.5 mm headset jack
- Website: motorola.com/us/products/droid-turbo-2

The Droid Turbo 2 and Moto X Force are high-end Android smartphones made by Motorola Mobility. The Droid Turbo 2 is exclusively sold in the United States with Verizon Droid brand, while the Moto X Force is available globally. It was released on October 27, 2015. The phone is marketed as having "the world's first shatterproof screen."

The Droid Turbo 2 would be one of the last smartphones to carry the Droid branding with Verizon.

== Hardware ==
The Moto X Force features a 2 GHz and 1.5 GHz octa-core Snapdragon 810 processor, 3 gigabytes of RAM, 32 or 64 gigabytes of internal storage which can be expanded up to 2 terabytes with a MicroSD card. It has a 5.4-inch AMOLED display, a 3,760 mAh battery as well as support for Motorola's TurboPower and Qualcomm Quick Charge 2.0, as well as PMA and Qi wireless charging standards, and a 21-megapixel main camera flanked by a 5 MP front camera with a flash.

This was the first Droid phone to be customizable through Motorola's Motomaker service, which allows customers to select various materials such as soft touch plastic, Ballistic Nylon from the original Droid Turbo, pebbled Horween leather and Saffiano leather, as well as aluminum frame, screen bezel and accent colors. The service also allows users to add a custom greeting which shows up during the Moto X Force's initial startup screen, and customers who choose the pebbled leather backs can also get a custom engraving. The 64 GB version comes with a free "Design Refresh" which allows owners to trade in their phone for a newly designed one within a year of the original purchase date. This is also the first Droid device since the Motorola Droid X2 that does not feature a DuPont Kevlar backing, a Motorola Droid trademark that started with the original Droid Razr.

=== Shatterproof screen ===
This is the first Motorola smartphone that features Motorola's "ShatterShield" technology, which consists of two touchscreen elements, reinforced by an internal aluminum frame to make it resistant to bending and cracking, although this does not protect against scratches or other superficial screen damage. The top layer of the display is designed to be user-replaceable. The screen and case also have a water repellent nanocoating to protect the device from liquids that could damage internal components.

=== Variants ===
There are three main models of the Droid Turbo 2 or Moto X Force.

Model Name	Model	Description
Moto X Force	XT1580	Single Sim, Global Model
Moto X Force	XT1581	Dual Sim, Chinese Model
Droid Turbo 2	XT1585	Verizon Exclusive
