= Moto G (3rd generation) =

Android smartphone developed by Motorola Mobility

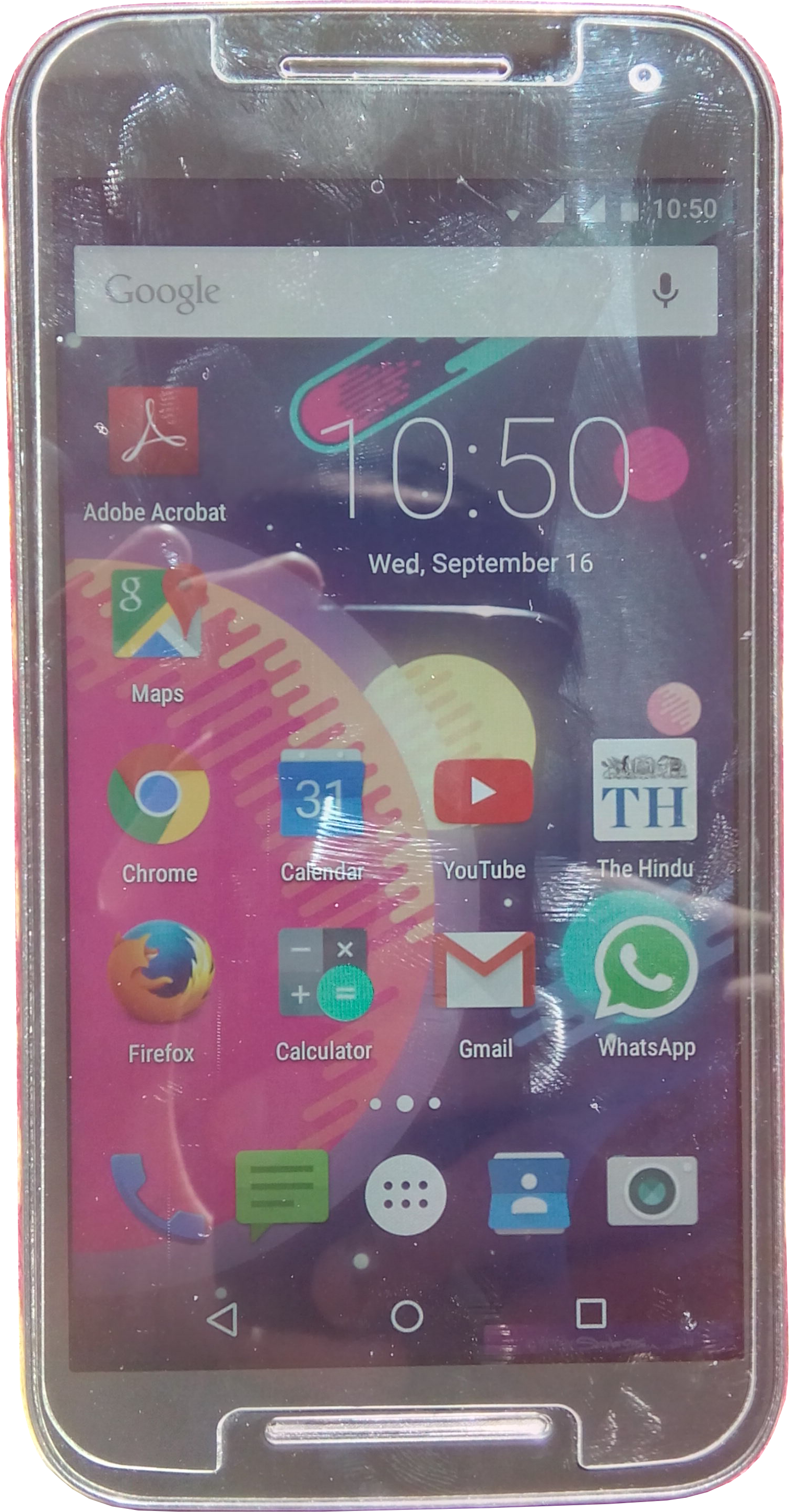
- Manufacturer: Motorola Mobility
- Type: Smartphone
- Series: Motorola Moto Normal: Moto G 3rd Generation Current: Moto G 2nd Generation
- First released: July 28, 2015
- Predecessor: Moto G (2nd generation)
- Successor: Moto G4
- Related: Moto X Style; Moto X Play
- Form factor: Phablet
- Dimensions: 142.1 mm (5.59 in) H 72.4 mm (2.85 in) W 11.6 mm (0.46 in) D
- Weight: 155 g (5.5 oz)
- Operating system: Original: Android 5.1.1 "Lollipop"; Current : Android 6.0.1 "Marshmallow"; Unofficial: Android 7.1.2 "Nougat" Android 10
- System-on-chip: Qualcomm Snapdragon 410
- CPU: 1.4 GHz 32-bit Quad-core
- GPU: Adreno 306
- Memory: 1 or 2 GB LPDDR2/3 RAM
- Storage: 8 or 16 GB, microSD card slot
- Removable storage: microSDXC up to 32 GB
- Battery: 2470 mAh Li-ion non-removable
- Rear camera: Sony IMX214 Exmor R CMOS 13 MP, f2.0 aperture, dual CCT dual tone flash, 1080p video recording @ 30fps, and slow motion recording up to 59.32fps.
- Front camera: 5 MP, f2.2
- Display: 5.0" (129 mm) 1280 x 720 (294 ppi) 720p IPS panel with Corning Gorilla Glass 3
- Sound: Earpiece, loudspeaker, 2-mic support
- Connectivity: Micro USB, 3.5 mm headset jack, Wi-Fi: 802.11 b/g/n (2.4 GHz only)
- Water resistance: IPX7
- Model: XT1540/41/42/43/48/50 (Moto G 3rd gen); XT1556/57 (Turbo Edition)
- Codename: Osprey
- Development status: Discontinued
- Website: US, UK, Australia, India, Argentina, Brazil

The third-generation Moto G is an Android smartphone developed by Lenovo's subsidiary Motorola Mobility, unveiled in India on July 28, 2015 and released the same day. The Moto G4 is its successor.

== Specifications ==
The third-generation Moto G has a 5-inch display with HD resolution of 1280x720p and features Corning Gorilla Glass 3, a 13-megapixel camera similar to the one from the Nexus 6 with many features including HDR imaging and an on-screen exposure setting option, a quad-core Snapdragon 410 processor, and the Android version 6.0.1 "Marshmallow". The phone back is removable, and made of textured plastic. The back also comes in multiple colors available in Motorola's Moto Maker website. The Moto G 3rd-generation is water resistant through the use of nano-coating and internal rubber gaskets, giving it an IPX7 rating. This water resistance gives the phone the ability to be submerged in up to one meter (or about three feet) of water for 30 minutes at a time with the back cover secured correctly. The model comes with 8GB of storage and 1GB of RAM, while the other model comes with 16GB of storage and 2GB of RAM. This phone also features a 2470 mAh Li-ion non-removable battery. Both models support LTE.

At launch, the phone ran a near-stock Android 5.1 Lollipop operating system, although it has since been upgraded to Android 6.0 Marshmallow, preloaded on new devices and upgradable via an OTA update for devices already on the Lollipop 5.1 OS. The Android Marshmallow 6.0 update for the Moto G 3rd-generation was first widely rolled out in North America starting on December 24, 2015. The phone has both a single-SIM and dual-SIM variant, availability of which vary by market.

== Variants ==
Model	Carriers/Regions	CDMA bands	GSM/GPRS/EDGE bands	UMTS/HSPA+ bands	LTE bands	Notes
XT1540	US (unlocked), Canada (all carriers or unlocked), Latin America (Tigo), Mexico (Unlocked)	N/A	850, 900, 1800, 1900	850, 1700/AWS, 1900, 2100	B2 (1900), B4 (1700), B5 (850), B7 (2600), *B12 (700), B17 (700)	Single SIM
XT1541	Europe	N/A	850, 900, 1800, 1900	900, 2100	B1 (2100), B3 (1800), B7 (2600), B8 (900), B20 (800)	Single SIM
XT1542/43/44	Colombia, Brazil, Latin America	N/A	850, 900, 1800, 1900	850, 900, 1700, 1900, 2100	B4 (1700), B7 (2600), B28 (700)	Dual SIM (XT1543/44), Digital TV (XT1544), Single SIM (XT1542).
XT1548	US (Sprint, US Cellular, Virgin Mobile)	800, 850, 1900	850, 900, 1800, 1900	850, 1700, 1900	B2 (1900), B4 (1700), B5 (850), B12 (700), B17 (700), B25 (1900), B26 (850), LTE-TDD: B41 (2500)	Single SIM
XT1550	Asia, Australia	N/A	850, 900, 1800, 1900	850, 900, 2100	B1 (2100), B3 (1800), B7 (2600), B8 (900), B28 (700), LTE-TDD: B40 (2300)	Dual SIM
XT1556	Mexico, Brazil, Colombia	N/A	850, 900, 1800, 1900	850, 900, 1700, 1900, 2100	B4 (1700), B7 (2600), B28 (700)	Turbo Edition Dual SIM
XT1557	India	N/A	850, 900, 1800, 1900	850, 900, 2100	B1 (2100), B3 (1800), B7 (2600), B8 (900), B28 (700), LTE-TDD: B40 (2300)	Turbo Edition Dual Sim

*Band 12 is available with the Android M update.

A Moto G Turbo Edition with a faster eight core Snapdragon 615 processor, 2 GB of RAM, IP67 rating, and Quick Charging was revealed for sale in Mexico, Colombia, and India on 13 November 2015.

== Reception ==
Example of customization allowed when ordering: white with orange accents with a message on the back.

The 3rd generation Moto G received a very positive reception upon release. The Moto G's performance from its 1.4 GHz Snapdragon 410 paired with either 1GB or 2GB of RAM was significantly faster than the 1.2 GHz Snapdragon 410 with 1GB of RAM in the Moto E, and almost as quick as devices powered by the more powerful 1.5 GHz Snapdragon 615 such as the Huawei P8 Lite, which has been attributed to the Moto G's largely bloat-free build of Android 5.1 "Lollipop". While the 2nd generation Moto G was regarded as a "sidegrade" rather than a true successor to the 1st generation (since it retains largely the same specifications), the Moto G 3rd generation was considered a big improvement over its predecessors. The rear camera's photo quality (except in low-light conditions) was much lauded considering the Moto G's budget price (sharing the same sensor as the much more expensive Nexus 6) and its predecessors' poor camera performance. The IPX7 water resistance (unique among smartphones in its price range at the time) was also praised by reviewers. Ars Technica proclaimed "the fact that the Moto G is so competent drives home the superfluousness of so many flagship phone features—the move from 720p to 1080p to 1440p and beyond, faster SoCs, ever-thinner metal-and-glass slabs. Those things are all nice to have, but you’d be hard-pressed to argue that any of them are essential," referring to the surprising value of the 3rd-generation Moto G considering its price.

There have been criticisms of the 3rd generation Moto G. For example, the IPS panel screen's calibration was poorer than its 2014 predecessor. Despite brighter, more vibrant colours and wider viewing angles, the display still suffered from "muted" greens and "washed-out" outdoor performance. Low light camera performance was also criticized (with similar criticism also being leveled at the Nexus 6, which shares the same camera sensor). The 8 GB of storage and 1 GB of RAM configuration leaves little more than 4 GB out-of-the-box for user-accessible storage, although this was partially addressed with the inclusion of a microSD card slot expandable officially up to 32 GB and unofficially up to 128 GB. The lack of RAM on the 8 GB model has also been said to significantly reduce multitasking performance. The criticisms aimed at the low-end model would not be so much of an issue for the 3rd-generation Moto G if the other model had been available in all markets, as some countries only have the 8 GB model available.

=== Known issues ===
Multiple users reported having a problem with the microSD card reader, which would stop recognizing the SD card, leading to possible loss of data and inability to use the SD card. The problem appears to remain unaddressed.

The Moto G3, like many older phones, is vulnerable to the series of vulnerabilities known as BlueBorne. Retail versions of this phone are no longer receiving security updates according to the Lenovo Support Site, so it will apparently remain unpatched (carrier support may vary). Unofficial versions via custom ROMs such as LineageOS were likely to solve two of those following issues.

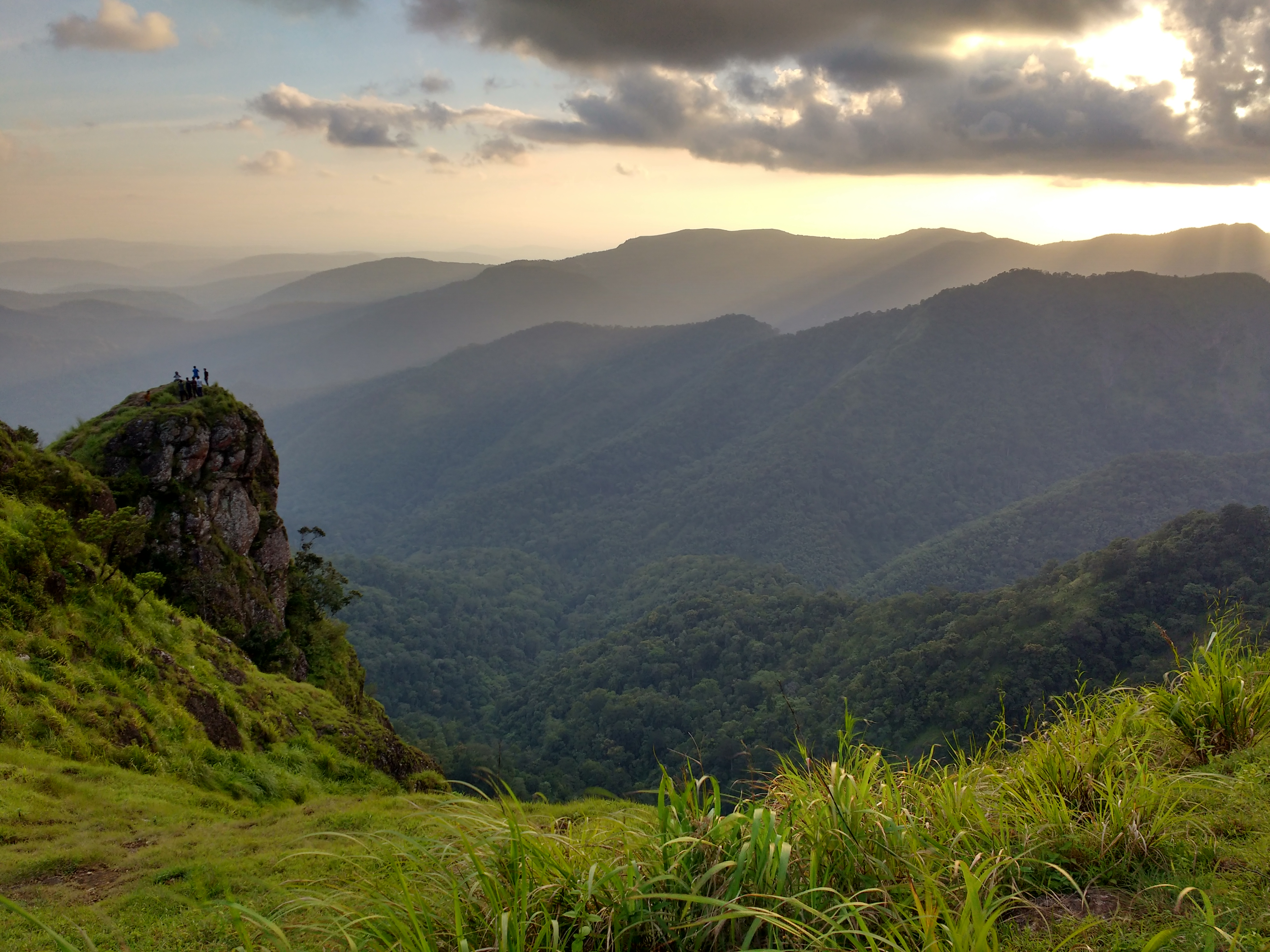
An Image taken using Moto G3 HDR Mode
