= Nexus 6P =

Android smartphone developed and marketed by Google and Huawei

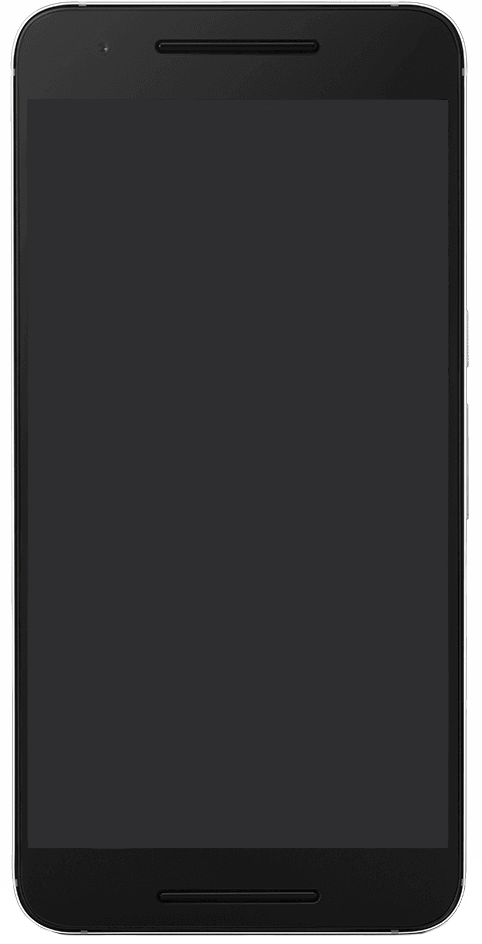
- The front view of the Nexus 6P
- Developer: Google, Huawei
- Manufacturer: Huawei
- Type: Phablet
- Series: Google Nexus
- First released: 29 September 2015; 11 years ago
- Availability by region: 29 September 2015: Ireland; Japan; United States; United Kingdom; 13 October 2015: India; Australia; 02 November 2015: Canada; Singapore; 16 November 2015: Hong Kong; 4 December 2015: South Korea; 8 December 2015: Malaysia; 11 December 2015: Philippines
- Discontinued: 4 October 2016
- Predecessor: Nexus 6
- Successor: Pixel XL
- Related: Nexus 5X
- Compatible networks: North America (H1511): GSM/EDGE: 850/900/1800/1900MHz; UMTS/WCDMA: B1/2/4/5/8; CDMA: BC0/1/10; LTE (FDD): B2/3/4/5/7/12/13/17/25/26/29/30; LTE (TDD): B41; CA DL: B2-B2, B2-B4, B2-B5, B2-B12, B2-B13, B2-B17, B2-B29, B4-B4, B4-B5, B4-B12, B4-B13, B4-B17, B4-B29, B41-B41; International (H1512): GSM/EDGE: 850/900/1800/1900 MHz; UMTS/WCDMA: B1/2/4/5/6/8/9/19; TDSCDMA: 34/39; CDMA: BC0/1; LTE (FDD): B1/2/3/4/5/7/8/9/17/19/20/28; LTE (TDD): B38/B39/40/41; CA DL: B1-B5, B1-B8, B1-B19, B3-B3, B3-B5, B3-B7, B3-B8, B3-B19, B3-B20, B3-B28, B5-B7, B7-B7, B7-B20, B7-B28, B39-B39, B40-B40, B41-B41
- Colors: Aluminium, Graphite, Frost
- Dimensions: 159.3 mm (6.27 in) H 77.8 mm (3.06 in) W 7.3 mm (0.29 in) D
- Weight: 179 g (6.31 oz)
- Operating system: Original: Android 6.0 "Marshmallow"; Last: Android 8.1 "Oreo"
- System-on-chip: Qualcomm Snapdragon 810 v2.1
- CPU: 2.0 GHz octa core (4×1.55 GHz Cortex-A53 & 4×2.0 GHz Cortex-A57) 64-bit ARMv8-A
- GPU: Adreno 430
- Memory: 3 GB of LPDDR4 RAM
- Storage: 32 GB, 64 GB, or 128 GB
- SIM: Single Nano SIM Slot
- Battery: 3,450 mAh Li-Po (Non-removable); 89 min charge, 6 h 24 min use
- Rear camera: 12.3 MP; Sony Exmor IMX377; 1.55 μm pixel size f/2.0 aperture IR laser-assisted autofocus 4K (30 fps) video capture Broad-spectrum CRI-90 dual flash 720p slow motion at 240 fps
- Front camera: 8 MP; Sony Exmor IMX179; 1.4 μm pixel size f/2.4 aperture HD video (30 fps)
- Display: 5.7 in (145 mm) diagonal WQHD AMOLED Cinematic Display with scratch-resistant Corning Gorilla Glass 4; 2560 × 1440 (518 ppi); 16∶9 aspect ratio Fingerprint and smudge-resistant oleophobic coating
- Sound: Dual front-facing stereo speakers 3 microphones (2 front, 1 rear) with noise cancellation 3.5 mm audio jack
- Media: Audio codec: MP3, MIDI, AMR-NB, AMR-WB, AAC, AAC+, eAAC+, PCM; Audio file format: *.mp3, *.mid, *.amr, *.3gp, *.mp4, *.m4a, *.aac, *.wav,*.ogg, *.flac, *.mkv; Video codec: H.263, H.264, MPEG-4; Video file format: *.3gp, *.mp4, *.webm, *.mkv
- Connectivity: Single USB-C 2.0; NFC; Bluetooth 4.2; LTE Cat. 6; Wi-Fi 802.11 a/b/g/n/ac 2×2 MIMO (Dual-Band, 2.4 GHz & 5.0 GHz); Nano-SIM; EDGE; UMTS; CDMA
- Data inputs: Multi-touch capacitive touchscreen, proximity sensor, gyroscope, digital compass, barometer, accelerometer, Hall-effect sensor, ambient-light sensor, Android Sensor Hub, GPS, GLONASS, Fingerprint Reader
- Model: H1511 (North America); H1512 (international)
- Codename: Angler
- Other: RGB LED Notification Light
- Website: support.google.com/nexus/answer/6102470#zippy=%2Cnexus-p

The Nexus 6P (codenamed Angler) is an Android smartphone developed and marketed by Google and Huawei. It succeeded the Nexus 6 as the flagship device of the Nexus line of Android devices by Google and was the final Nexus before Google switched to the Pixel lineup. Officially unveiled on 29 September 2015 along with the Nexus 5X at the Google Nexus 2015 press event held in San Francisco, it was made available for pre-order on the same day in United States, United Kingdom, Ireland, and Japan.

Significant changes over previous Nexus devices include an all-aluminum based body that is thinner and lighter than the Nexus 6, a rear fingerprint reader called Nexus Imprint, a faster octa-core Snapdragon 810 v2.1 system-on-chip (SoC), an AMOLED display, better cameras, enhanced LTE connectivity, a reversible USB-C dock connector, and the removal of wireless charging. The Nexus 6P was also the first Nexus device to be available with 128 GB of internal storage, as well as the first Nexus device to be offered with a gold color option.

The Nexus 6P served as a launch device for Android 6.0 Marshmallow which introduced a refreshed interface, performance and battery life improvements, Google Now on Tap integration, a fine-grained permission model, fingerprint verification, and other new features. On 4 October 2016, Google presented its successor, the Google Pixel.

According to Google, the "P" in 6P stands for "premium".

== History ==
The Nexus 6P is the first Nexus phone that Google has chosen to co-develop with a Chinese company, Huawei. Images of the device first leaked in September 2015, showing an aluminum design with a raised bar on the top of the device containing a camera.

After the Nexus 6P was formally unveiled on 29 September 2015 at a press event at Left Space Studios in San Francisco by Android Engineering VP Dave Burke, It was made available with the 32 GB model starting for $499.

Significant effort went into improving the design of the Nexus 6P compared to its predecessor, with Google exercising a considerable amount of design influence. Google engineers mention that an effort was made to improve the ergonomics of one-handed use of the phone by shrinking the screen to 5.7 inches, and a singular bump on the Nexus 6 was changed to a horizontal strip to avoid the potential of the phone spinning when lying on a flat surface. There was pushback on certain design elements, notably the centering of the reversible USB-C charging port. Huawei VP of R&D described the Nexus 6P as a dream project, despite the challenges including the short development cycle, technological complexities in introducing a phone with the LTE bands to target the global market, and the design difficulties in an all-aluminum phone.

In October 2016, Google removed the Nexus 6P from the online Google Store. Consequently, Google updated its support pages indicating that:

- Android version updates for the Nexus 6P are not guaranteed after September 2017.
- Security updates for the Nexus 6P are not guaranteed after November 2018.

In April 2019, Google and Huawei agreed to compensate owners of a faulty device with up to $400. This stems from a lawsuit filed by 6P owners over a bootlooping issue that caused devices to shut down randomly.

== Specifications ==
=== Hardware ===
The Nexus 6P features an octa-core Snapdragon 810 v2.1 system-on-chip (SoC) with four ARM Cortex-A57 cores at 1.95 GHz and four ARM Cortex-A53 cores at 1.55 GHz in a big.LITTLE architecture. The SoC includes an Adreno 430 GPU including support up to OpenGL ES 3.1.

The Nexus 6P has 3 GB of LPDDR4 RAM, which has lower energy consumption compared to the LPDDR3 utilized in the Nexus 6. Available storage sizes include options of 32, 64, or 128 GB of internal storage. The storage used is Samsung-manufactured eMMC 5.0 multi-level cell NAND flash fabricated at 10 nm.

Similar to the previous Nexus 6, the Nexus 6P also uses an AMOLED display manufactured by Samsung. The screen has a Wide Quad HD (2560 × 1440) resolution at 518 ppi. It has a reduced screen size of 5.7 inches (140 mm) which contributes to improved accessibility. The AMOLED screen used is the same generation but lower binned compared to those used in the Samsung Galaxy Note 5, the latest available as of the time of release. Benchmarks conducted by AnandTech indicates that this results in a screen power efficiency that is in-between that of the Note 5 and Note 4. It was found that the phone contains a sRGB mode in "Developer Options" that increased color accuracy by lowering saturation.

The battery has a 3450 mAh capacity and uses a USB-C connector for charging.

The Nexus 6P was available in four different colors: Aluminum, Graphite, Frost, or Gold.

=== Software ===
The phone arrives running Android 6.0 Marshmallow. Compared to its predecessor Android 5.x Lollipop, the most significant changes include a new permissions architecture that allows for fine-grained control of app permissions instead of bulk permission granting during app install, and Google Now on Tap, an ability to perform a Google search based on the information currently displayed by holding down on the home button.

Due to the popularity of fingerprint-based authentication, there is now support for an official fingerprint API that allows users to unlock their phones and perform app purchases in Google Play. Android 6.0 Marshmallow also allows website owners to set a preferred app to open their links in, and allows users greater control over this behavior. Sharing has been improved with a feature called "Direct Share", which allows information to be sent to a contact directly, rather than to a third-party app first. On-screen volume controls have also been simplified, with more extensive control exposed via a tap. Text selection has been redesigned to show a floating toolbar next to the highlighted text, replacing the actionbar which existed at the top of the screen in previous versions of Android.

Android 6.0 Marshmallow includes a battery life-enhancing feature called "Doze Mode" that suspends network access, disables sync and scheduled jobs for suspended apps during periods when the phone is inactive.

In December 2015, Google released Android 6.0.1 Marshmallow for the Nexus 6P, among other devices.

Google released Android 7.0 Nougat for the Nexus 6P, as well as several other devices, on 22 August 2016.

Google released Android 7.1.1 Nougat for the Nexus 6P (among other devices) in December 2016. Among other changes, this update brought some features to the Nexus 6P that had been previously exclusive to the Pixel and Pixel XL phones.

Google released Android 8.0 Oreo for the Nexus 6P, among other devices, in August 2017. Android 8.1 Oreo was released for the Nexus 6P, as well as some other devices, on 5 December 2017. There will be no future updates for the Nexus 6P.

=== Sensors ===
The Nexus 6P has a rear facing Sony Exmor IMX377 sensor with f/2.0 aperture, that can take 12.3-megapixel (4032 × 3024) photos. Its large pixel size of 1.55 μm assists photography in low light conditions. It is capable of recording video at 4K resolution, as well as slow-motion 720p video capture at 240 fps. The front facing camera has a Sony Exmor IMX179 8.08 megapixel sensor with an f/2.4 aperture lens. The IMX179 was previously used in the rear camera of the Nexus 5.

The back of the phone includes a round fingerprint recognition sensor branded Nexus Imprint below the camera. It is based on the low power FPC1025 sensor developed by Fingerprint Cards AB that can read dry or wet fingerprints in 360°, with a resolution of 508 dots per inch.

A TMD27723 digital ambient light and proximity sensor from ams AG is present on the front of the device. Internally, there is a Bosch Sensortec BMI160 inertial measurement unit with an accelerometer and gyroscope, a Bosch BMM150 geomagnetic sensor, and a Bosch BMP280 barometric pressure sensor.

To save power, Google has introduced what it calls an 'Android Sensor Hub'. This is a low-power secondary processor whose purpose is to monitor the device's movement by connecting directly to the accelerometer, gyroscope, fingerprint reader, and the camera's sensors. This chip runs advanced activity-recognition algorithms that allow it to interpret activities and gestures independently of the main processor. The main CPU needs to be engaged when something happens that requires more attention. The Sensor Hub recognizes when the device has been picked up and will automatically display notifications in a low-power white-on-black text until the screen has been properly activated. Additionally, the Sensor Hub stack also supports hardware sensor batching, a feature introduced in KitKat that permits sensors for a short period of time to delay handing off non-critical data to the operating system – as opposed to sending a constant stream of data to the CPU that results in the use of more power. Sensor batching has been used in step counters and therefore does not require the main processor to constantly remain awake as each step is measured.

=== Design ===
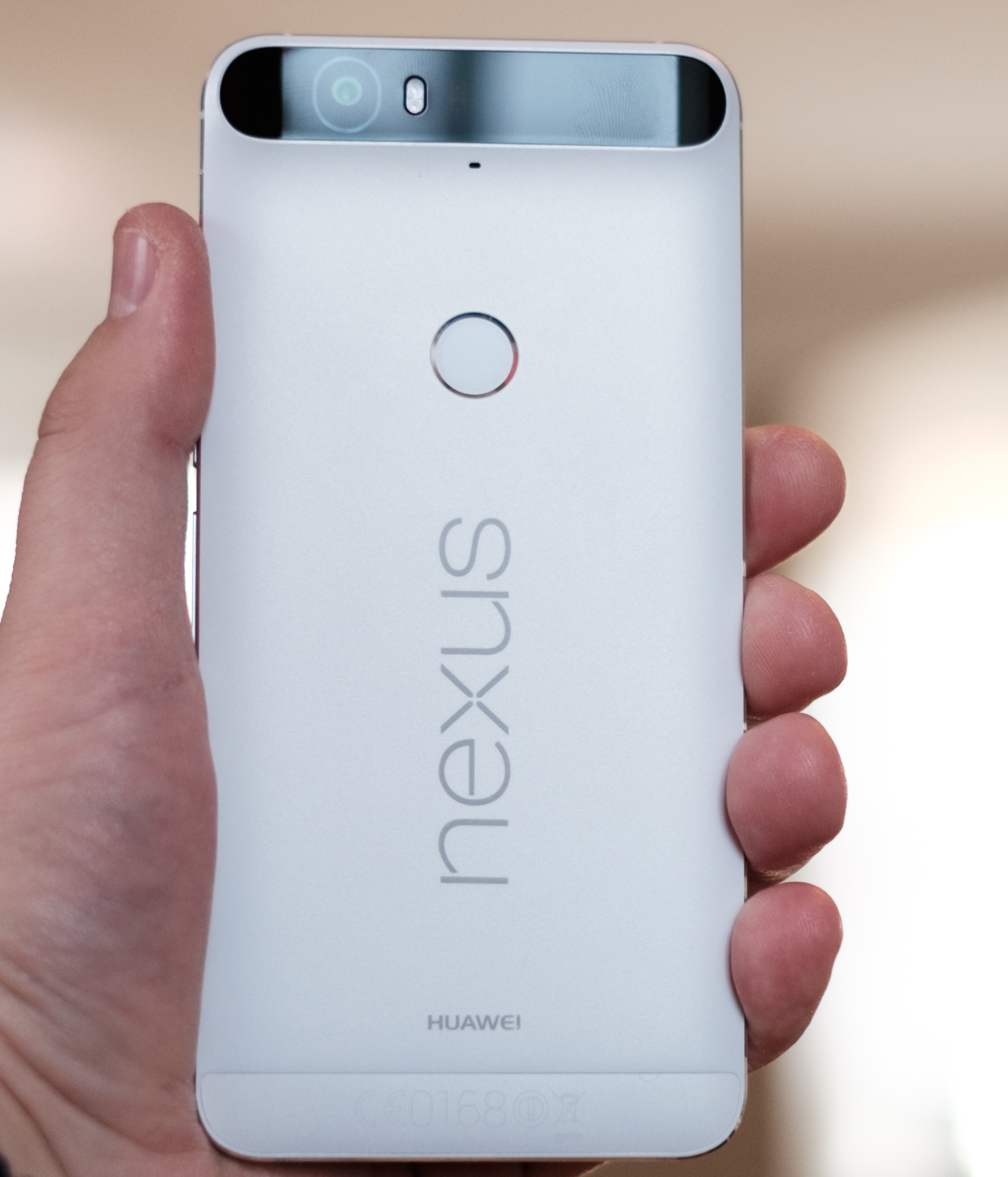
Rear view, showing "visor" and fingerprint sensor

The phone is the first in the Nexus lineup with an "all-metal body" (still contains some plastic parts). Color choices include aluminium, graphite, frost, and gold (available in Japan, India and the US).

The Nexus 6P has dimensions of 159.3 mm × 77.8 mm × 7.3 mm (6.27 in × 3.06 in × 0.29 in). Compared to the Nexus 6, which is 159.3 mm × 82.9 mm × 10.1 mm (6.27 in × 3.26 in × 0.40 in), the Nexus 6P is both thinner and less wide than the Nexus 6. With a mass of 178 g, the Nexus 6P is also 6 grams lighter than the Nexus 6.

The screen is protected by a panel of Gorilla Glass 4, while the back and sides are aeronautical-grade anodized aluminum. There is a rear bump that spans the width of the phone that houses the camera sensor, LED flash, laser auto focus, NFC coil, GPS, Bluetooth, Wi-Fi and cellular antennas. Internally this bump was called a "visor".

=== Network compatibility ===
Model	FCC id	Carriers/Regions	GSM bands	CDMA bands	UMTS bands (3G)	TD-SCDMA	LTE bands	CA DL bands
H1511	QISH1511	North America	Quad	0 / 1 / 10	1 / 2 / 4 / 5 / 8	—N/a	2 / 3 / 4 / 5 / 7 / 12 / 13 / 17 / 25 / 26 / 29 / 30 / 41	B2-B2, B2-B4, B2-B5, B2-B12, B2-B13, B2-B17, B2-B29, B4-B4, B4-B5, B4-B12, B4-B13, B4-B17, B4-B29, B41-B41
H1512	QISH1512	Rest of world	Quad	0 / 1	1 / 2 / 4 / 5 / 6 / 8 / 9 / 19	34 / 39	1 / 2 / 3 / 4 / 5 / 7 / 8 / 9 / 17 / 19 / 20 / 28 / 38 / 39 / 40 / 41	B1-B5, B1-B8, B1-B19, B3-B3, B3-B5, B3-B7, B3-B8, B3-B19, B3-B20, B3-B28, B5-B7, B7-B7, B7-B20, B7-B28, B39-B39, B40-B40, B41-B41

== Reception ==
The Nexus 6P received generally positive reviews. Ars Technica termed the Nexus 5X and the Nexus 6P "the true flagships of the Android ecosystem" and noted the "few to no compromises"; with further praise for the 6P for being only slightly more expensive than the 5X while having a more premium metal body and higher specs. The Verge considers the Nexus 6P as "the best" Android phone with "beautiful hardware and a camera that can finally compete". Anandtech praised the camera as a "high-end performer", but was critical of the price outside North America and Europe. Wired called the Nexus 6P "the best hardware Google (and its partner Huawei) can make, and the best software, all in a single slick package", applauded the "ridiculously fast" fingerprint recognition, the "ultra-fast charging", and called it the "best smartphone camera".

Compared to the preceding Nexus 6, the Nexus 6P lacks optical image stabilization and water resistance, as well as wireless charging.

iFixit gave the Nexus 6P a 2 out of 10 in terms of repairability, praising the solid construction which improved durability, but mentions that it is "very difficult" to open the device without damaging the glass camera cover due to the unibody design, and panned the difficulty in replacing the screen and the adhesive holding the rear cover panels and battery in place.

== Issues ==
There have been anecdotal claims of the rear glass cover of the visor cracking. The cause of this issue is suspected to be the lack of expansion joints, which makes the glass susceptible to thermal shock when there is a sudden temperature change, like entering a warm room from cold outside. This issue may affect just a particular batch of handsets and thus only a portion of consumers.

Shortly after the device was launched, it was reported that the device chassis was susceptible to bending under pressure. While bending under pressure is not unique to the Nexus 6P, it was reportedly easier to bend than the iPhone 6 Plus.

Some users have reported Bluetooth issues, manifesting as stuttering music when playing to Bluetooth speakers. Google said it is already working on them.

There have been reports of microphone issues that result in weak and spotty voice quality. Google is investigating the issue, and it is suspected that the issue is partially caused by noise cancellation.

Connectivity issues were reported after the launch in Australia by users of the Telstra 4GX (LTE Band 28) network. Issues included occasional drops out from the 4G/4GX network, such as when switching from Wifi to 4G/4GX.

The phone sometimes switches to landscape mode without a clear reason, and it does not go back to portrait.

When receiving a call in a three-way call, the user cannot send messages.

The initial rollout of the Android 7.0 Nougat software update in September 2016 was temporarily halted after reports of battery drain among early updaters. The issue was fixed and the rollout continued.

=== Class action lawsuit ===
There was a known issue where the battery would suddenly drop to zero. Also certain sets would get caught in a bootloop rendering them useless. Following a class action lawsuit in the United States, Huawei agreed to reimburse owners up to $400 for the issues. A similar class action lawsuit was authorized in the province of Quebec, Canada on 23 March 2018.

== See also ==
- Comparison of Google Nexus smartphones
- Project Fi
