= Moto X Style =

Android smartphone developed by Motorola Mobility

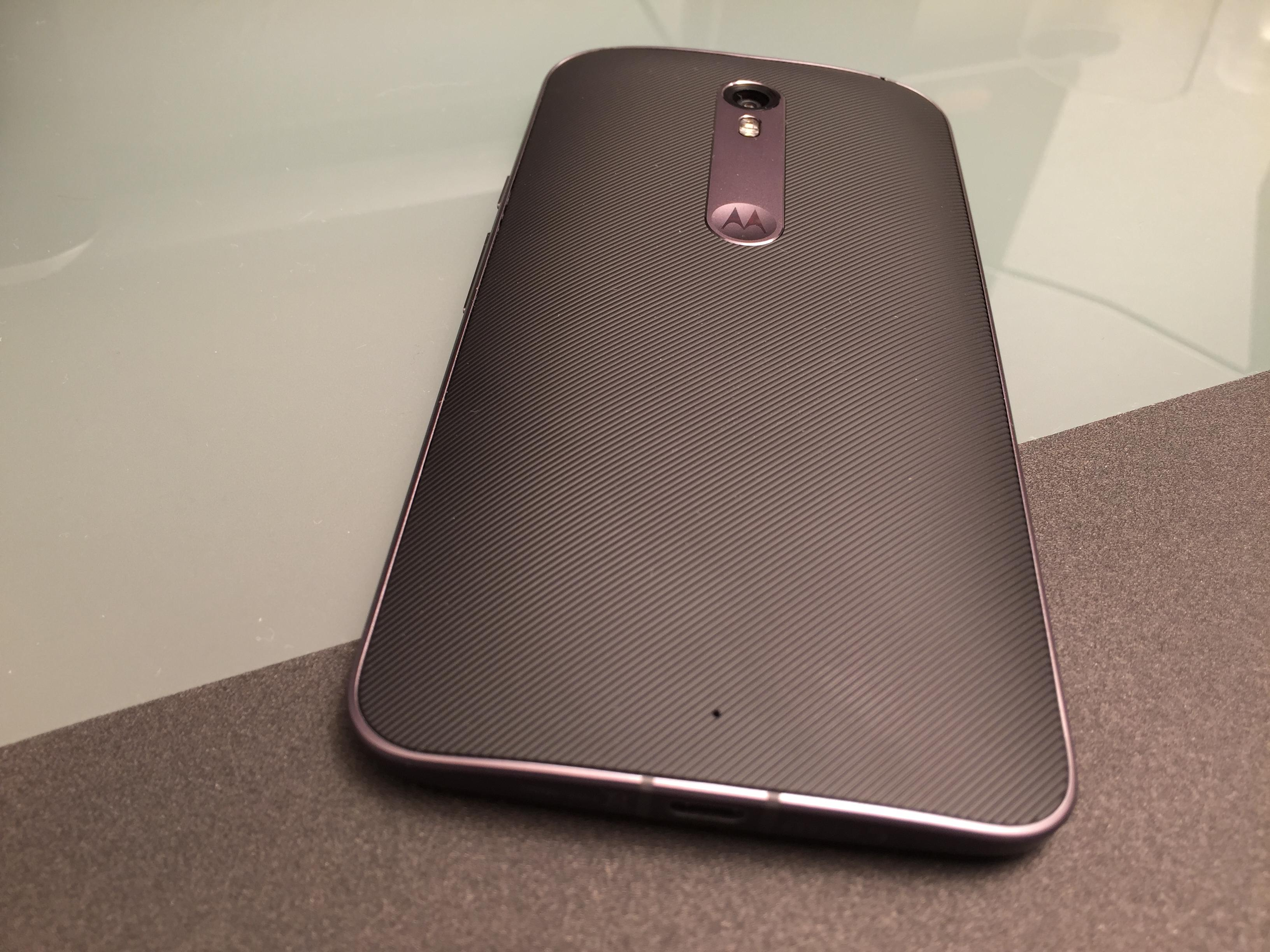
- Manufacturer: Motorola Mobility
- Type: Phablet
- Series: Motorola Moto
- First released: September 2, 2015; 11 years ago
- Predecessor: Moto X (2nd generation); Moto X Pro
- Successor: Moto X (4th generation)
- Related: Moto X Play; Moto X Force; Moto G (3rd generation)
- Form factor: Touchscreen Bar
- Dimensions: 153.9 mm (6.06 in) H 76.2 mm (3.00 in) W 11.1 mm (0.44 in) D
- Weight: 179 g (6.3 oz)
- Operating system: Original: Android 5.1.1 "Lollipop"; Current: Android 7.0 "Nougat"
- System-on-chip: Qualcomm Snapdragon 808
- CPU: 1.8 GHz 64-bit Hexa-core
- GPU: Adreno 418
- Memory: 3 GB LPDDR3 RAM
- Storage: 16, 32, and 64 GB
- Removable storage: microSDXC up to 128 GB
- Battery: 3000 mAh Li-ion non-removable
- Rear camera: 21 MP Sony Exmor IMX230, f2.0 aperture, 1/2.4" sensor, dual CCT flash, 4K video recording @ 30 fps, 1080p @ 60fps, slow motion recording
- Front camera: 5 MP, f2.0, wide-angle lens, with flash
- Display: 5.7 in (140 mm) 2560 x 1440 (520 ppi) Quad HD IPS TFT LCD with Corning Gorilla Glass 3
- Sound: Front-facing dual stereo speakers
- Connectivity: GPS, Wi-Fi, NFC, Bluetooth, USB, USB OTG, Miracast, Infrared motion sensors
- Website: Official website

The Moto X Style (branded as Moto X Pure Edition in the US) is the flagship third-generation of Moto X Android smartphone developed and manufactured by Motorola that was released on September 2, 2015.

== Release ==
The Style was announced on July 28, 2015, at a press event in New York City, announced alongside its counterparts the Moto X Play and the Moto G (3rd generation).

In the United States, the phone was not offered through any carrier subsidiaries and would be released unlocked, offering the consumer quicker software updates, avoiding carrier input. In addition, the U.S. version supports GSM, CDMA2000, HSPA+, and 14 different LTE bands, enabling it to be used on any of the country's four major carriers (AT&T, Sprint, T-Mobile, Verizon).

In December, a limited edition of the Moto X Pure Edition was launched in the United States which featured three different designs to symbolize "the spirit" of Moto Maker, designed by Jonathan Adler in partnership with Motorola.

The Moto X Style was not sold in Canada, as that market received only the Moto X Play.

== Specifications ==
=== Hardware ===
Similar to its predecessors, the phone's design features a curved rear casing and body frame made of aluminum. The rear casing and metal trim color of the phone can be customized by the customers before purchasing the phone by using Motorola's Moto Maker which offers rear casing made of materials such as Horween leather, wood and silicone and a number of colors for the metal trim.

The phone weighs 179 g (6.3 oz) with the dimensions of 153.9 mm (6.06 in) height, 76.2 mm (3.00 in) width and 11.1 mm (0.44 in) depth. The display of the device is 5.7 in (140 mm) IPS TFT LCD protected with Corning Gorilla Glass 3 with the resolution of 2560 × 1440 pixels and pixel density of 520 ppi.

The device features a 64-bit Hexa-core Snapdragon 808 system-on-chip with a clock speed of 1.8 GHz and 3 GB of RAM. The internal storage configurations are available in 16 GB, 32 GB and 64 GB, with all variants featuring storage expansion via microSD card up to 128 GB.

The Moto X Style is equipped with a 21-megapixel rear-facing camera utilizing phase detection autofocus along with ƒ/2.0 aperture and dual-LED tone flash. The camera is capable of recording video at 4K up to 30 fps. The front-facing camera is 5-megapixel with aperture of ƒ/2.0 and LED flash.

=== Software ===
The Moto X Style comes pre-installed with Android 5.1.1 "Lollipop" utilizing a stock Android experience along with additional, proprietary software features developed by Motorola, including their signature gestures that provide shortcuts to certain actions. Motorola has announced that the phone would be upgraded to Android 6.0 Marshmallow which would bring features such as a new power management system known as "Doze". In November, Motorola released the Android 6.0 update for users in India and Brazil, with Europe following in December.

In December 2015, Motorola launched a soak test of the Android 6.0 update for the Moto X Pure Edition to a limited number users in the US. The update was released a week later for the users of Verizon, Sprint and US Cellular.

In September 2017, Motorola sent out an Android 7.0 update to all US users.

== Variants ==
The Moto X Style has multiple variants to support 3G and 4G networks of different carriers in different countries:

Model	FCC ID	Regions	CDMA2000 bands	GSM bands	UMTS bands	LTE bands	Notes
XT1570		China	800	Quad	850/900/1900/2100	1/3/7/17/20/38/39/40/41	SIM unlocked
XT1572		Europe, Australia, India and most Latin American carriers	N/A	Quad	800/850/900/1700/1900/2100	1/2/3/4/5/7/8/12/17/20/25/28/40/41	SIM unlocked
XT1575		U.S. (Moto X Pure Edition)	800/850/1900	Quad	850/900/1700(AWS)/1900/2100	1/2/3/4/5/7/8/12/13/17/25/26/38/41	SIM unlocked

All variants support the four 2G GSM bands 850/900/1800/1900.

Preceded by Moto X (2014)	Moto X Style; 2015	Succeeded by Latest model
