= Sound Amplifier =

Android accessibility app by Google

- Developer(s): Google
- Initial release: 2019; 6 years ago
- Operating system: Android OS

Sound Amplifier is an accessibility mobile application developed by Google for the Android operating system. It acts like a hearing aid using internet and artificial intelligence.

== History ==
Google launched Sound Amplifier in 2019 for Android 6.0 and above.
