= Lenovo A536 =

Smartphone model

- Brand: Lenovo
- Developer: Lenovo
- Manufacturer: Lenovo
- Type: Smartphone
- Series: A series
- Compatible networks: 2G (GSM 850/900/1800/1900 MHz), 3G (HSPA+ 900/2100 MHz)
- Form factor: Slate
- Colors: White; Black
- Dimensions: 139.6 mm × 72 mm × 9.95 mm (5.50 in × 2.83 in × 0.39 in)
- Weight: 148 g (5.22 oz)
- Operating system: Android 4.4.2 KitKat
- System-on-chip: MediaTek MT6582M
- CPU: 1.3 GHz quad-core Cortex-A7
- GPU: Mali-400MP2
- Memory: 1 GB RAM
- Storage: 8 GB
- Removable storage: microSD, up to 32 GB
- SIM: Dual SIM (Mini-SIM, dual stand-by)
- Battery: 2000 mAh Li-Po (replaceable)
- Rear camera: 5 MP, auto-focus, LED flash
- Front camera: 2 MP, fixed-focus
- Display: 5.0 in (130 mm) FWVGA (854×480 pixels) capacitive touchscreen
- Model: Lenovo A536

The Lenovo A536 is an entry-level Android smartphone developed and manufactured by Lenovo.

== Specifications ==
=== Hardware ===
The Lenovo A536 is powered by a MediaTek MT6582M System-on-Chip (SoC) featuring a 1.3 GHz quad-core ARM Cortex-A7 processor alongside a Mali-400MP2 graphics processing unit (GPU). It comes equipped with 1 GB of RAM and 8 GB of internal storage, which can be expanded up to 32 GB via a dedicated microSD card slot.

The device features a 5.0-inch FWVGA capacitive display with a resolution of 854 × 480 pixels.

The phone includes a rear-facing 5-megapixel auto-focus camera with an LED flash, alongside a 2-megapixel fixed-focus front camera for video calls and selfies. Connectivity options include 3G network connectivity, Wi-Fi 802.11 b/g/n, Bluetooth 4.0, GPS, and dual Mini-SIM support with dual standby capability. The device is powered by a user-replaceable 2000 mAh Lithium-Polymer battery and weighs approximately 148 grams.

=== Software ===
The Lenovo A536 runs on Android 4.4.2 KitKat out of the box, customized with Lenovo's proprietary user interface.

It comes pre-installed with Lenovo's DOit suite of applications, including SHAREit for wireless file transfers, SECUREit for system security and virus protection, and SYNCit for backing up contacts and messages.
