= Nexus 5 =

Android smartphone by LG Electronics

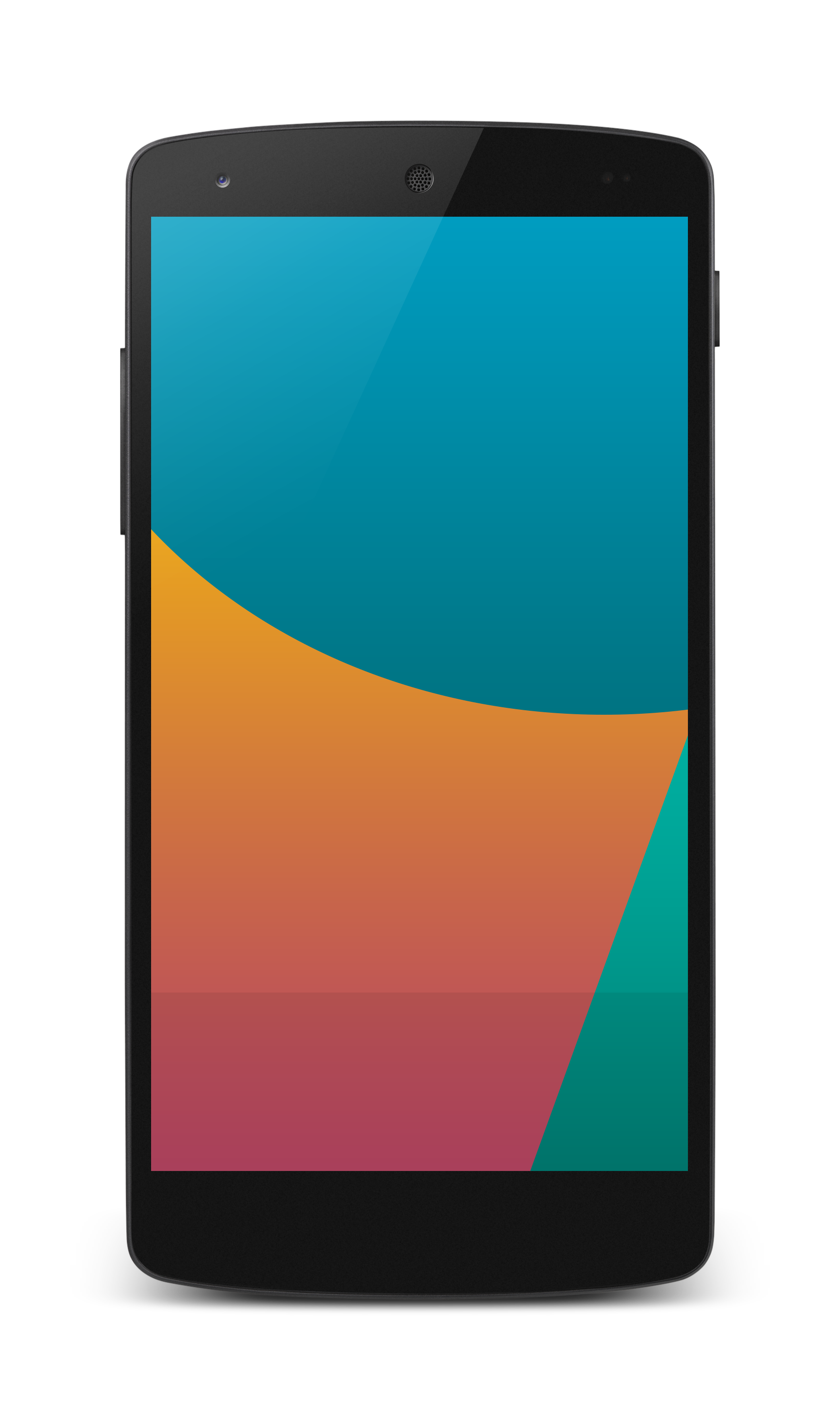
- Front view of the Nexus 5
- Developer: Google, LG Electronics
- Manufacturer: LG Electronics
- Type: Smartphone
- Series: Google Nexus
- First released: October 31, 2013; 13 years ago
- Availability by region: 31 October 2013: Australia; Canada; France; Germany; Italy; Japan; South Korea; Spain; United Kingdom; United States; 20 November 2013: India; Nepal; Hong Kong; 27 November 2013: Sweden; Norway; Netherlands; Turkey
- Discontinued: March 11, 2015
- Predecessor: Nexus 4
- Successor: Nexus 6, Nexus 5X
- Related: LG G2, Nexus 7 (2013)
- Compatible networks: 2G/3G/4G LTE; GSM: 850/900/1800/1900 MHz; Model LG-D820 (North America); CDMA band class: 0/1/10; WCDMA bands: 1/2/4/5/6/8/19; LTE bands: 1/2/4/5/17/19/25/26/41; Model LG-D821 (international); WCDMA bands: 1/2/4/5/6/8; LTE bands: 1/3/5/7/8/20
- Form factor: Slate
- Dimensions: 137.84 mm (5.427 in) H 69.17 mm (2.723 in) W 8.59 mm (0.338 in) D
- Weight: 130 g (4.6 oz)
- Operating system: Original: Android 4.4.2 "KitKat"; Last: Android 6.0.1 "Marshmallow"
- System-on-chip: Qualcomm Snapdragon 800
- CPU: 2.26 GHz quad-core Krait 400
- GPU: Adreno 330, 450 MHz
- Memory: 2 GB of LPDDR3-1600 RAM
- Storage: 16 GB (12.55 GB available) or 32 GB (26.7 GB available)
- Battery: 3.8 V 2300 mAh, 8 Wh; Qi wireless charging non-replaceable
- Rear camera: 8 MP Sony Exmor IMX179 1/3.2-inch, (1.4-μm pixels) CMOS sensor with OIS, f/2.4 aperture and LED flash.
- Front camera: 1.3 MP Aptina MT9M114B 1/6.0-inch, (1.9-μm pixels) CMOS sensor, f/2.4 aperture
- Display: 4.95 in (126 mm) Full HD 1080×1920 px (445 ppi) IPS LCD, with Corning Gorilla Glass 3
- Sound: Monaural lateral loudspeaker, dual microphones, 3.5 mm stereo audio jack
- Connectivity: Micro USB, SlimPort, NFC, Bluetooth 4.0, Wi-Fi 802.11 a/b/g/n/ac (single stream)
- Data inputs: Multi-touch capacitive touchscreen, proximity sensor, gyroscope, compass, barometer, accelerometer, Hall-effect sensor, ambient light sensor, GPS, GLONASS, Beidou, step counter and detector
- Model: LG-D820 (North America); LG-D821 (International)
- Codename: Hammerhead
- SAR: Head: 0.810 W/kg (1 g); Body: 0.998 W/kg (1 g); Hotspot: 0.998 W/kg (1 g)
- Other: Multi-color LED notification light
- Website: https://www.google.com/nexus/5/ at the Wayback Machine (archived October 31, 2013)

The Nexus 5 is an Android-based smartphone sold by Google and manufactured by LG Electronics. It is the fifth generation of the Nexus series, succeeding the Nexus 4. It was unveiled on October 31, 2013, and served as the launch device for Android 4.4 "KitKat", which introduced a refreshed interface, performance improvements, greater Google Now integration, and other changes. Much of the hardware is similar to the LG G2 which was also made by LG and released earlier that year.

The Nexus 5 received mostly positive reviews, praising the device's balance of overall performance and cost in comparison to other "flagship" phones, along with the quality of its display and some of the changes introduced by Android 4.4.

The Nexus 5 was followed by the Nexus 6 in October 2014, although the Nexus 6 is a higher-end phablet and not a direct successor, with the Nexus 5 and Nexus 6 sold alongside each other for several months. Google ended production of the Nexus 5 in December 2014, but sales of the black Nexus 5 continued until March 11, 2015.

Google released the Nexus 5X in September 2015 (alongside the higher-end Nexus 6P), with a similar design and price as the original Nexus 5.

== History ==
The device was unveiled on October 31, 2013; it was made available for pre-order from Google Play Store the same day, sold in a black color with either 16 or 32 GB of internal storage. Initial pricing was set at $349 for the 16 GB model, and $399 for the 32 GB version. This was much lower than comparable smartphones, which would cost around $649.

Google released two additional color options in February 2014, white and red, which had identical pricing and hardware.

Google ended production of the Nexus 5 in December 2014, following the release of the Nexus 6. The red and white models were removed from the Google Play Store the same month, while the black model remained available until March 11, 2015.

== Hardware ==
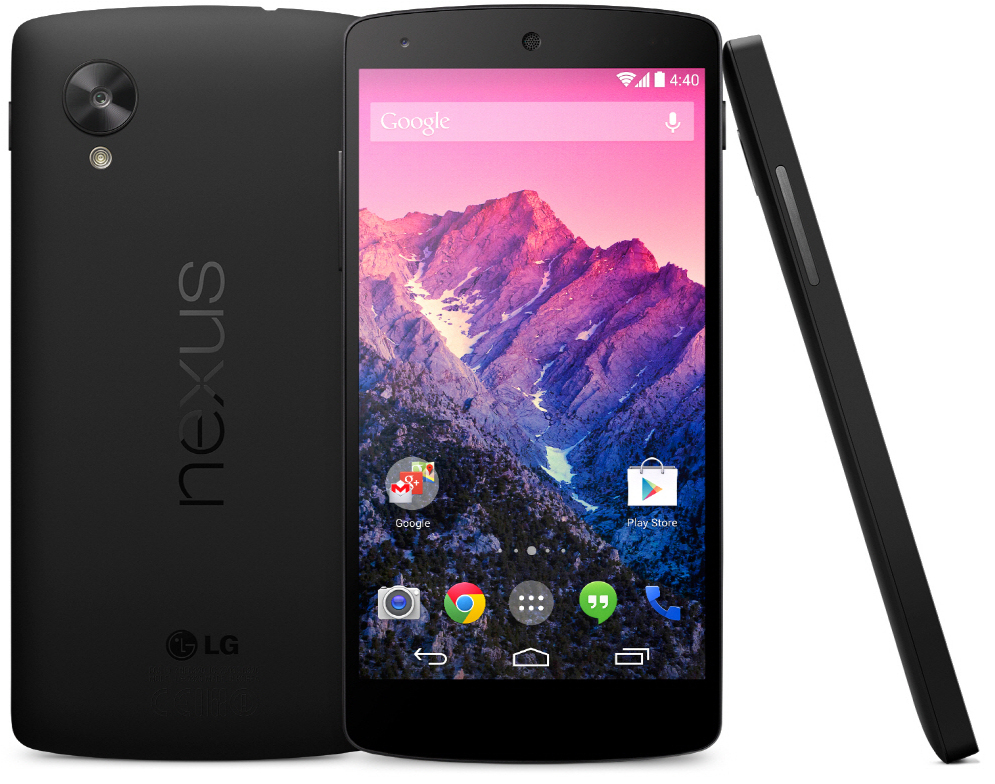
Back, front and side view of a black Nexus 5

The exterior of the Nexus 5 is made from a polycarbonate shell with similarities to the 2013 Nexus 7, unlike its predecessor, which uses a glass-based construction. Three exterior colors are available: black, white, and red.

Its hardware contains similarities to the LG G2; it is powered by a 2.26 GHz quad-core Snapdragon 800 processor with 2 GB of RAM, either 16 or 32 GB of internal storage, and a 2300 mAh battery. The Nexus 5 uses a 4.95-inch (marketed as 5-inch) 445 PPI 1080p IPS display, and includes an 8-megapixel rear-facing camera with optical image stabilization (OIS), and a 1.3-megapixel front-facing camera. The Nexus 5 supports LTE networks where available, unlike the Nexus 4 which unofficially supported LTE on Band 4 only with a hidden software option, but was not formally approved or marketed for any LTE use. There are two variants of the Nexus 5, with varying support for cellular frequency bands; one is specific to North America (LG-D820), and the other is designed for the rest of the world (LG-D821).

Notable new hardware features also include two new composite sensors: a step detector and a step counter. These new sensors allow applications to easily track steps when the user is walking, running, or climbing stairs. Both sensors are implemented in hardware for low power consumption. Like its predecessors, the Nexus 5 does not have a microSD card slot, while it features a multi-color LED notification light. There are two grills present on the lower edge of the Nexus 5: one is for the mono speaker and the other is for the microphone.

== Software ==
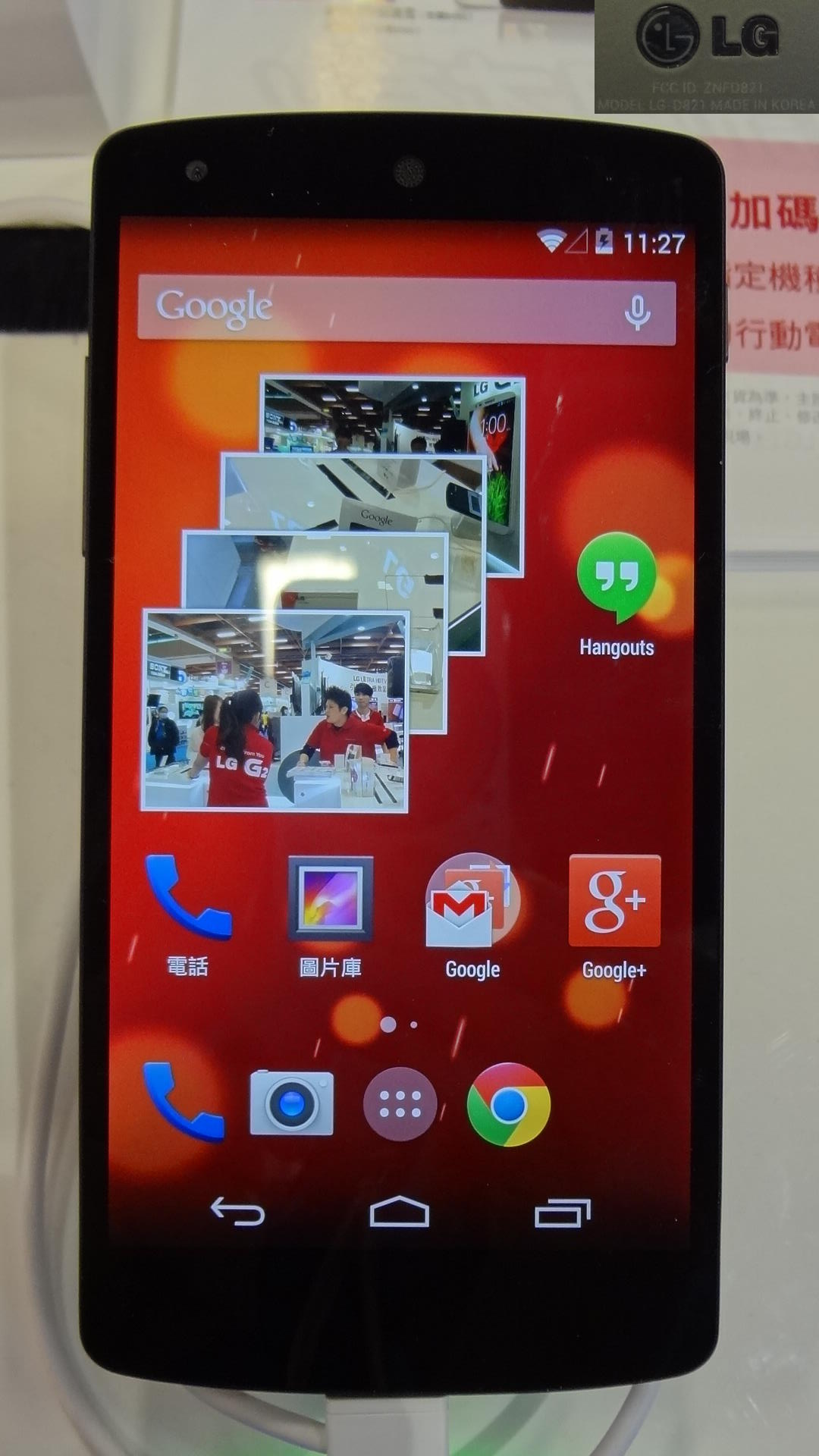
Nexus 5, LG-D821 model (international)

The Nexus 5 was the first Android device to ship with Android 4.4 "KitKat", which had a refreshed interface, improved performance, improved NFC support (such as the ability to emulate a smart card), a new "HDR+" camera shooting mode, native printing functionality, a screen recording utility, and other new and improved functionality.

The device also shipped with Google Now Launcher, a redesigned home screen which allows users to quickly access Google Now on a dedicated page, and allows voice search to be activated on the home screen with a voice command. Unlike the stock home screen, Google Now Launcher is not a component of Android itself; it is implemented as part of the Google Search application. Until February 26, 2014, when it was released on Google Play Store for selected Android 4.4 devices, Google Now Launcher was exclusively shipped by default on the Nexus 5, and was not enabled in Android 4.4 updates for any other Nexus device. While an update to the Google Search application containing Google Now Launcher (which itself was tweaked to improve compatibility with other devices as well) was publicly released shortly after the Nexus 5's release, the launcher itself could not at the time be enabled without installing a second shim application.

Hangouts, which now supports text messaging, is used as the default text messaging application.

In December 2013, the Nexus 5 began receiving the Android 4.4.1 update, which introduced HDR+, fixed issues with auto focus, white balance, and other camera issues. HDR+ takes a burst of shots with short exposures, selectively aligning the sharpest shots and averaging them using computational photography techniques. Short exposures avoid blur, blowing out highlights, and averaging multiple shots reduces noise. HDR+ is similar to lucky imaging used in astrophotography. HDR+ is processed on the Qualcomm Hexagon DSP. It also fixes low speaker volume output in certain applications. Android 4.4.2 update followed in a few days, providing further bugfixes and security improvements. In early June 2014, the Nexus 5 received Android 4.4.3 update that included dozens of bug fixes, while another mid-June 2014 Android 4.4.4 update included a fix for an OpenSSL man-in-the-middle vulnerability.

A developer preview of the Android 5.0 "Lollipop" system image was released for the Nexus 5 after the annual Google I/O conference held on June 26, 2014. The release version of Android 5.0 "Lollipop" was made available on November 12, 2014, in form of factory operating system images. On December 15, 2014, Android 5.0.1 "Lollipop" update began rolling out to Nexus 5 with build number LRX22C, the update was listed as being "miscellaneous Android updates." In March 2015, the Nexus 5 began receiving the Android 5.1 "Lollipop" update, which addresses performance issues and other user interface tweaks; however, it is known to introduce certain camera issues. In June 2015, Google made the Android 5.1.1 "Lollipop" update available for Nexus 5 aiming to fix the bugs that were not fixed by Android 5.1 update.

In May 2015, a developer preview of Android Marshmallow was made available for the Nexus 5.

In November 2015, Nexus 5 started receiving Android 6.0 "Marshmallow" update across the world. Following which Nexus 5 became one of the first devices to get an Android 6.0.1 Marshmallow update in December 2015. In August 2016, Google confirmed that the Nexus 5 will not receive an official Android 7.0 Nougat update, meaning that Android 6.0.1 Marshmallow is the last officially supported Android version for the device. The Nexus 5's Snapdragon 800 has sufficient processing power to run Android 7.0 Nougat, as shown by successful tests with the Android N Developer Preview program (indeed the Snapdragon 800 is more powerful than the Snapdragon 410 which does support Nougat), and unofficial custom Nougat ROMs have been created for the Nexus 5.

The Nexus 5 can also run other mobile operating systems such as Ubuntu Touch.

== Reception ==
The Nexus 5 received mostly positive reviews; critics felt that the device provided a notable balance between performance and pricing. Although noting nuances with its display, such as its color reproduction and low maximum brightness in comparison to competitors, CNET praised software features such as the new phone dialer interface and Google Now integration on the home screen, but did not believe KitKat provided many major changes over its predecessors. Hangouts as the default text messaging app was criticized for its user interface and for attempting to force the use of a Google service, while the quality of photos taken with the device was described as being "great, but it didn't particularly blow me away." In conclusion, the Nexus 5 was given a 4 out of 5, concluding that "to even compare this $400 phone to those that cost upward of $650 unlocked (like the Samsung Galaxy S4, HTC One, and Apple iPhone 5S) speaks volumes about the Nexus 5's massive appeal and affordability", and that the device "extends the allure of the Nexus brand to anyone simply looking for an excellent yet inexpensive handset."

Engadget was similarly positive in its review of the Nexus 5, but noted that the device's LTE support was lacking, as its supported bands are segregated across two model variants, and does not support Verizon Wireless. While praised for its crisp quality, it was noted that the display did not render colors (particularly black and white) as richly as the Galaxy S4, but added that "if you think saturated colors are overrated anyway, you're going to love the display here." While considered an improvement over the Nexus 4, the device's battery life was criticized for not being as good as its competitors, and the quality of its camera was considered to be inconsistent. In conclusion, Engadget argued that "whether or not it was the company's intent, Google is sending a message to smartphone makers that it's possible to make high-quality handsets without costing consumers the proverbial arm and leg. Now we just wait and see if that message will be warmly received."

Compared to the LG G2 which was released earlier and shares the same manufacturer and much of the same hardware, the Nexus 5 has a lower-quality rear camera and smaller battery to hit a cheaper price point. However, Nexus 5 has been touted as a clean Android software alternative with the added advantage of running the latest Android 4.4 "KitKat".

DPReview praised the Android 4.4.1's HDR+ which brought substantial improvement in speed and prioritized faster shutter speeds with higher ISOs which reduced blur. The computational photography increased dynamic range and reduced noise. However, HDR+ resulted in less detail and more noise in low-light scenes.

The Nexus 5 still held up well against newer devices as it performed faster than the follow-up Nexus 6 released a year later, also noting that the Nexus 6 (at an MSRP of US$650 versus US$350) was much more expensive.

Since the release, a portion of users have reported frequent crashes of the camera app which supposedly would not allow use of the camera unless the phone was restarted. It is unknown whether this problem has been fixed.

== See also ==
- Comparison of Google Nexus smartphones
