= Nexus 6 =

Android smartphone developed by Motorola Mobility and Google

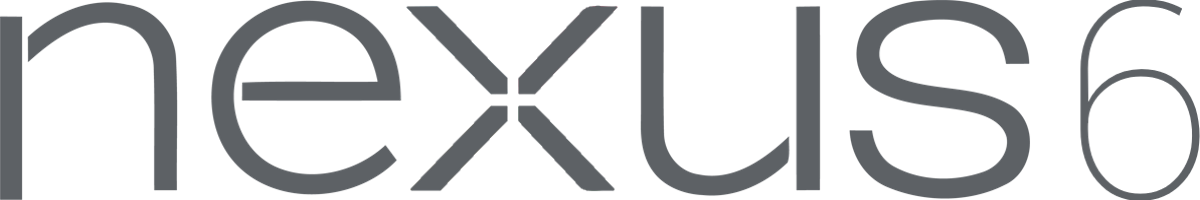

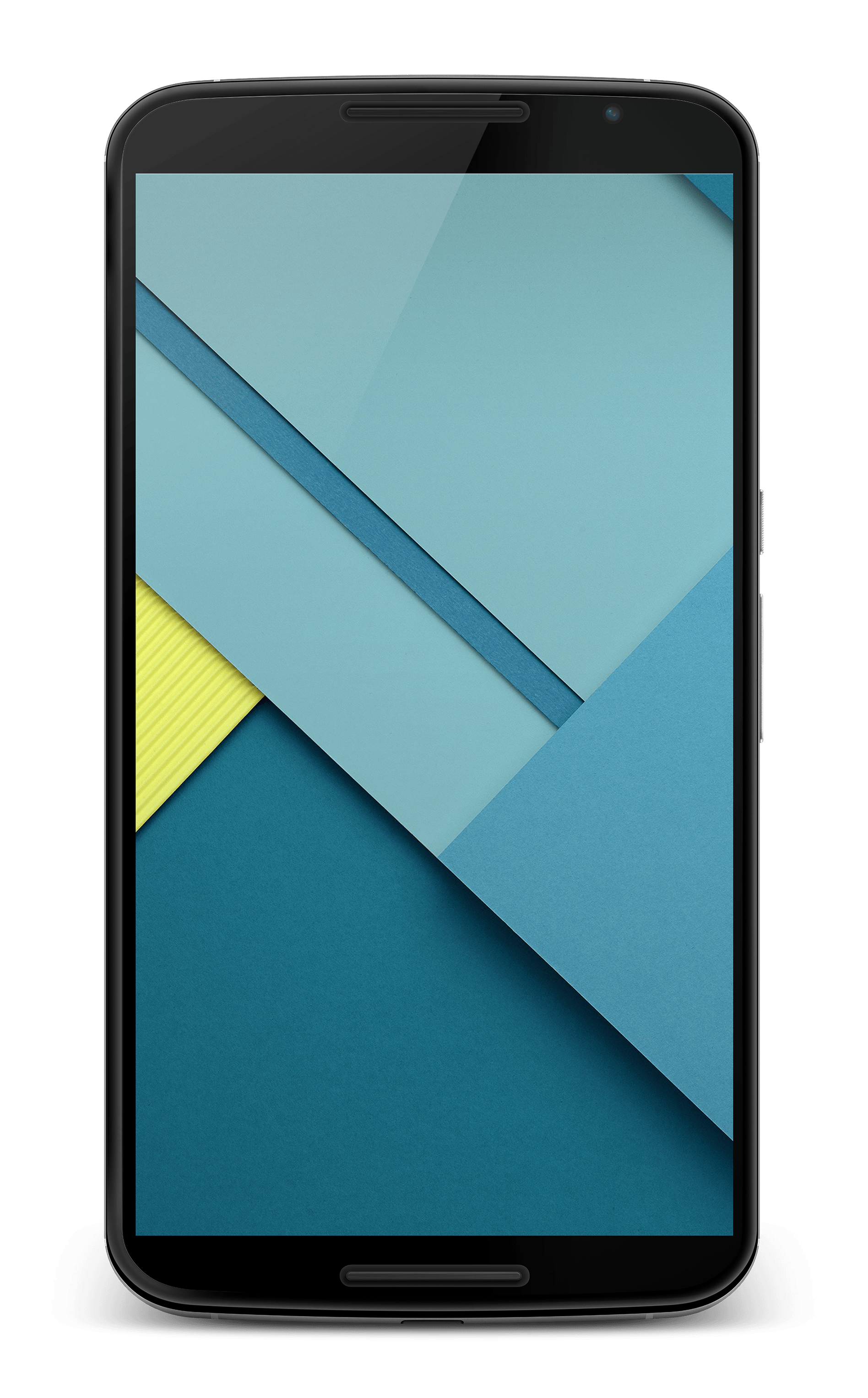
- Front view
- Developer: Google and Motorola Mobility
- Manufacturer: Motorola Mobility
- Type: Smartphone
- Series: Google Nexus
- First released: November 2014; 12 years ago
- Discontinued: December 9, 2015; 10 years ago
- Predecessor: Nexus 5
- Successor: Nexus 6P; Moto X Style (for Moto X Pro, China Only)
- Related: Moto X (2nd generation) and Nexus 9
- Compatible networks: 2G/3G/4G LTE; GSM: 850/900/1800/1900 MHz; Model XT1103 (Americas): CDMA band class: 0/1/10; WCDMA bands: 1/2/4/5/8; LTE bands: 2/3/4/5/7/12/13/17/25/26/29/41; CA DL bands: B2-B13, B2-B17, B2-29, B4-B5, B4-B13, B4-B17, B4-B29; Model XT1100 (International): WCDMA bands: 1/2/4/5/6/8/9/19; LTE bands: 1/3/5/7/8/9/19/20/28/41; CA DL bands: B3-B5, B3-B8
- Form factor: Phablet
- Dimensions: 159.26 mm (6.270 in) H 82.98 mm (3.267 in) W 3.8–10.06 mm (0.150–0.396 in) curve
- Weight: 184 g (6.5 oz)
- Operating system: Original: Android 5.0 "Lollipop"; Last: Android 7.1.2 "Nougat"
- System-on-chip: Qualcomm Snapdragon 805
- CPU: Qualcomm 2.7 GHz quad-core Krait 450
- GPU: Adreno 420
- Memory: 3 GB of LPDDR3 RAM
- Storage: 32 GB or 64 GB
- Removable storage: Not available
- Battery: Non-removable 3.8 V 12.2 Wh (3,220 mAh), Qi wireless charging, turbo charging
- Rear camera: Sony IMX214 Exmor R CMOS 13 MP 1/3.06" (1.12-μm pixels) with OIS, f/2.0 aperture and dual LED ring flash
- Front camera: 2 MP, 1/6", 1.4 μm, f/2.2 aperture, FoV 71.6°
- Display: 5.96 in (151 mm) 16∶9 PenTile RGBG AMOLED, 2560 × 1440 (QHD) @ 493 ppi, scratch-resistant Corning Gorilla Glass 3 capacitive touchscreen
- Sound: Dual front facing stereo speakers, 3.5 mm headphone jack with 4 button headset compatibility
- Connectivity: Micro USB, NFC, Bluetooth 4.1, Wi-Fi 802.11 a/b/g/n/ac 2×2 (MIMO), Nano-SIM
- Data inputs: Multi-touch capacitive touchscreen
- Codename: Shamu
- Other: Notifications LED (requires root access)
- Website: https://www.google.com/nexus/6 at the Wayback Machine (archived September 28, 2015)

The Nexus 6 is a phablet co-developed by Google and Motorola Mobility that runs the Android operating system. It is the successor to the Nexus 5 and the sixth smartphone in the Google Nexus series, a family of Android consumer devices marketed by Google and built by an original equipment manufacturer partner. The Nexus 6 and the HTC Nexus 9 served as the launch devices for Android 5.0 Lollipop.

The Nexus 6's design and hardware are very similar to those of the second-generation Moto X, which was released around the same time, with the Nexus 6 being enlarged with higher specifications.

== Release ==
The Nexus 6 was unveiled on October 15, 2014, with pre-order availability since October 29, 2014, and a delivery date in early November. Off-contract pricing in the United States was US$649 for the 32 GB model and US$699 for the 64 GB model. The Nexus 6 was available through Google Play Store, Motorola Mobility, Best Buy, T-Mobile, AT&T, Sprint, U.S. Cellular, and Verizon Wireless in the United States.

In November 2014, availability was announced for 12 other countries, including Australia, Belgium, Canada, France, Germany, India, Italy, Japan, the Netherlands, Spain, Sweden and the United Kingdom.

The AT&T version is SIM-locked, with tethering disabled until a fee is paid to enable it, and comes with custom ringtones.

On January 26, 2015, Motorola (now a subsidiary of Chinese firm Lenovo) announced that a similar device would be released in China, named Moto X Pro; it excludes Google services and applications, but still runs a similarly stock version of Android.

On April 22, 2015, it was announced that the Nexus 6 would be the only phone then supported by Google's new Project Fi venture.

Following the September 2015 release of the Nexus 6's successor, the Nexus 6P, Google stopped selling the Nexus 6 on the Play Store in December 2015. Google has a stated policy of at least two years of software updates and three years (or 18 months after the last sale date on the Play Store, whichever is longer) of security updates. The Nexus 6 had guaranteed software updates through October 2016 and security patches through October 2017; however, Google announced that the Nexus 6 would receive the Android 7.1 update. This update was initially expected in December 2016, but it was delayed until January 5, 2017 due to a "last minute bug". In January 2017, Google announced that the Nexus 6, along with the Nexus 9 tablet, would not receive the Android 8 update, making 7.1.2 the last major software update from Google themselves; however, the phone was to continue to receive monthly security patches while retaining the last major Android version received until October 2017.

== Specifications ==
=== Hardware ===
The Nexus 6 is powered by a 2.7 GHz quad-core Snapdragon 805 processor with 3 GB of RAM, and either 32 or 64 GB of internal storage. It features a 3220 mAh battery with quick charging technology that promises to deliver six hours of operation after 15 minutes of charging. The Nexus 6 uses a 5.96-inch (marketed as six-inch) QHD AMOLED PenTile (RGBG) display with a resolution of 2560×1440 pixels (493 PPI), and includes a 13-megapixel rear-facing camera with optical image stabilization (OIS), surrounded by a dual LED flash ring, and a two-megapixel camera on front.

Like its predecessor, the Nexus 6 does not have a microSD card slot, a removable battery, or an FM radio receiver/transmitter.

The Nexus 6's hardware supports USB On-The-Go for storage devices, the functionality was initially turned off by software but was enabled in later Android updates.

==== Variants ====
Model	FCC id	Carriers/Regions	CDMA bands	GSM bands	UMTS bands (3G)	LTE bands	CA DL bands
XT1100	IHDT56QD2	International	—N/a	Quad	1 / 2 / 4 / 5 / 6 / 8 / 9 / 19	FDD:1 / 3 / 5 / 7 / 8 / 9 / 19 / 20 / 28 / TDD:41	B3-B5, B3-B8
XT1103	IHDT56QD1	US	0 / 1 / 10	Quad	1 / 2 / 4 / 5 / 8	FDD:2 / 3 / 4 / 5 / 7 / 12 / 13 / 17 / 25 / 26 / 29 TDD:41	B2-B13, B2-B17, B2-29, B4-B5, B4-B13, B4-B17, B4-B29
XT1115	—N/a	China	0	Quad	1 / 2 / 5 / 8 TD-SCDMA:34 / 39	FDD:1 / 3 / 7 / 20 / 28 TDD:38 / 39 / 40 / 41	

=== Software ===
The Nexus 6 was Google's first phone to launch with HDR+. HDR+, which takes a burst of shots with short exposures, selectively aligns the sharpest shots and averages them using computational photography techniques. Short exposures avoid blur, and averaging multiple shots reduces noise. HDR+ is similar to lucky imaging used in astrophotography. HDR+ is processed on the Qualcomm Hexagon DSP.

The Nexus 6 was released with Android 5.0 Lollipop.

The Nexus 6 was the first Android device to have integrated IMS Wi-Fi calling on T-Mobile, which was delivered via an OTA update. WiFi Calling on T-Mobile's network has existed since 2007, although this is the first time native WiFi calling has been integrated into the core of Android. Previously, T-Mobile offered WiFi calling on select Android handsets using software from Kineto Wireless.

In September 2015, Android 5.1.1 was rolled out to the Nexus 6, containing a fix for the Stagefright bug.

In November 2015, Nexus 6 started receiving Android 6.0 Marshmallow update across the world. The following month, the Nexus 6 became one of the first devices to get the Android 6.0.1 update.

On August 22, 2016, Android 7.0 Nougat began rolling out to several supported Nexus devices; however, the Nexus 6 version was delayed. Weeks after the official roll-out, Google stated that the Nexus 6 release would come "in the coming weeks." Nougat was eventually released for the Nexus 6 on October 3, 2016, 6 weeks after the official Nougat release. There has been no official statement on the cause of the delay.

On October 11, 2016, Google officially announced Android 7.1 Nougat after it had been debuted with the Google Pixel release the week before. This announcement confirmed that the Nexus 6, along with other supported devices, would receive Android 7.1 in early December. On December 5, 2016, Google announced the official release of Android 7.1.2 Nougat with most supported Google devices receiving the update; however, the Nexus 6 was not included. On December 27, 2016, Google told Android Police that a "last minute bug" was discovered and will delay the update until "early January". Google officially released Android 7.1.2 for the Nexus 6 on January 5, 2017.

== Reception ==
Matt Swider from TechRadar wrote: "Nexus 6 proves that Google's Nexus program is not only far from dead, but it's alive and kicking with a powerful 6-inch phablet that runs its latest Android software. It's bigger than the Note 4, but not better." The Nexus 6 was given 4.5 out of 5 stars in the TechRadar review.

== Known issues ==
- Some devices delivered through AT&T had a bug that caused the devices to boot to a black screen. AT&T will replace these defective units.
- Devices with Sprint SIM cards experience issues with receiving calls.
- Some devices have an issue that causes the phone's back panel to come off. The issue may be due to the glue used on the back panel or to an expanding battery pack that could be a fire hazard. Motorola is offering replacements for affected devices.
- The Nexus logo on the back of a device is known to peel off.

== See also ==
- Comparison of Google Nexus smartphones
