= Android KitKat =

2013 Android mobile operating system

- Version of the Android operating system

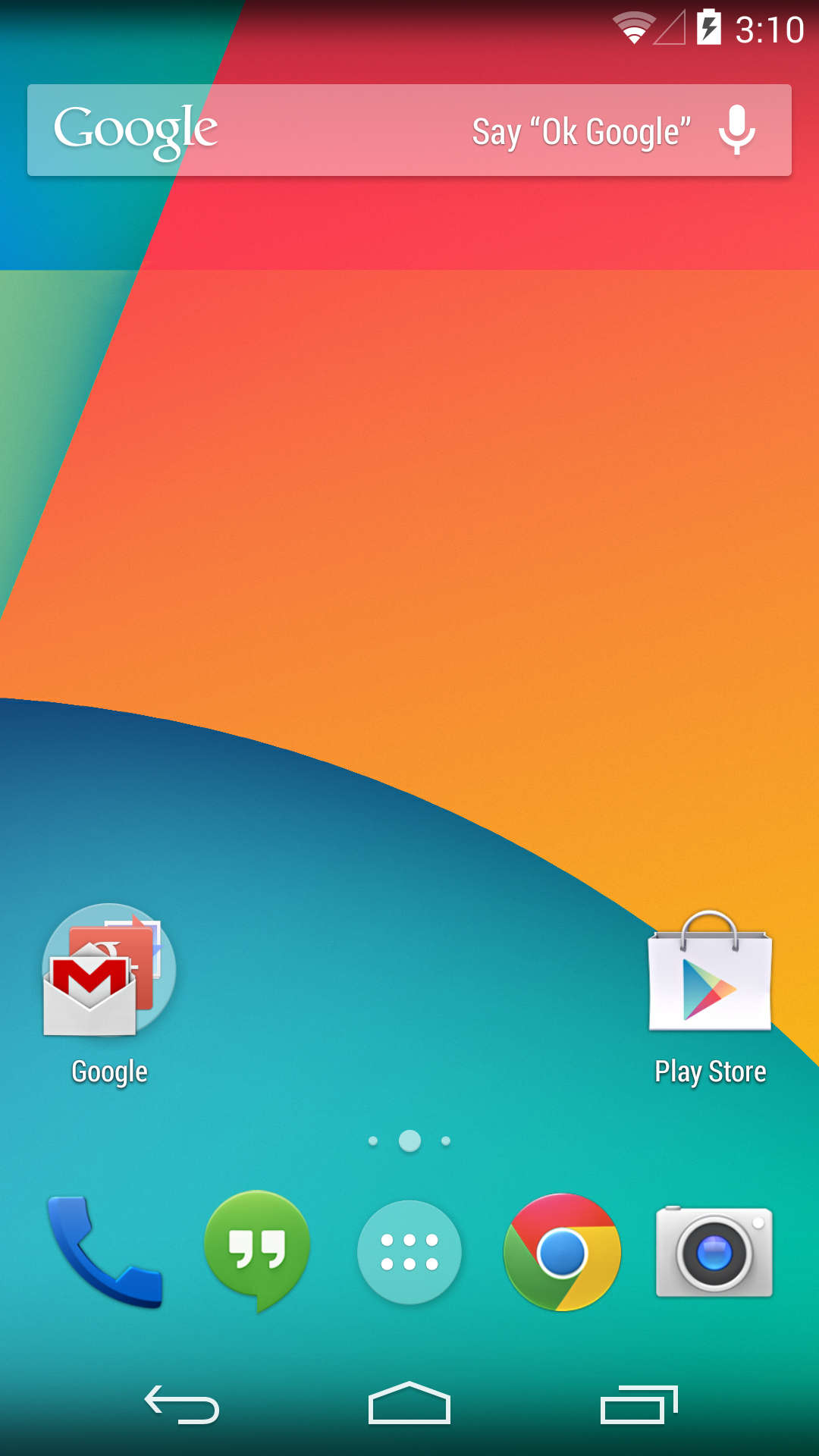
- Android KitKat running on a Nexus 5
- Developer: Google
- Released to manufacturing: September 3, 2013; 13 years ago
- General availability: October 31, 2013; 13 years ago (as Android 4.4) June 25, 2014; 12 years ago (with Wearable Extensions)
- Final release: 4.4.4_r2.0.1 (KTU84Q) / July 7, 2014; 12 years ago
- Kernel type: Monolithic (Linux)
- Preceded by: Android Jelly Bean (4.1–4.3)
- Succeeded by: Android Lollipop (5.0–5.1)
- Official website: www.android.com/versions/kit-kat-4-4/

Support status
- Unsupported since October 1, 2017; Google Play Services support dropped since August 2023

Android KitKat is the codename for the eleventh version of the Android mobile operating system, representing release version 4.4. Unveiled on September 3, 2013, KitKat focused primarily on optimizing the operating system (running on as little as 512 MB of RAM; Project Svelte) for improved performance on entry-level devices with limited resources. It is the last version of Android to use the "Holo" interface. On July 24, 2023, Google announced that Google Play Services would no longer support KitKat in August of that year. The first phone with Android KitKat was the Nexus 5.

As of March 2026, 0.06% of Android devices run KitKat.

== History ==
Android 4.4 "KitKat" was officially announced on September 3, 2013. The release was internally codenamed "Key Lime Pie"; but John Lagerling, director of Android global partnerships, and his team, decided to drop the name, arguing that "very few people actually know the taste of a key lime pie". Aiming for a codename that was "fun and unexpected", his team pursued the possibility of naming the release "KitKat" instead. Lagerling phoned a representative of Nestlé, who owns the KitKat brand and produces the confectionery (outside the United States, where it is made by The Hershey Company under license), and quickly reached a preliminary deal for a promotional collaboration between the two companies, later finalized in a meeting at Mobile World Congress in February 2013. The partnership was not revealed publicly, or even to other Google employees and Android developers (who otherwise continued to internally refer to the OS as "KLP"), until its official announcement in September.

As part of the promotional efforts, Kit Kat bars in the shape of the Android robot logo were produced, while Hershey ran a contest in the United States with prizes of Nexus 7 tablets and Google Play Store credit.

The Nexus 5, developed by LG Electronics, was unveiled on September 30, 2013, as the launch device for KitKat.

One of the bugs introduced in version 4.4 and solved in version 4.4.1 was the hairy heart: the yellow heart emoji ⟨💛⟩ would be shown as a hairy heart ⟨⟩.

Up to October 2017, Android 4.4 was still supported by Google with security patches for the source code.

== Development ==
Continuing the focus on improving visual performance and responsiveness on Android 4.1 "Jelly Bean", the main objective of Android 4.4 was to optimize the platform for better performance on low-end devices without compromising overall capabilities and functionality. The initiative was codenamed "Project Svelte", which Android head of engineering Dave Burke joked was a weight loss plan after Jelly Bean's "Project Butter" added "weight" to the OS. To simulate lower-spec devices, Android developers used Nexus 4 devices underclocked to run at a reduced CPU speed with only a single core active, 512 MB memory, and at 960×540 display resolution—specifications meant to represent a common low-end Android device.

A development tool called ProcStats was developed to analyze app memory usage over time, especially for apps that run background services. This data was used to optimize and decouple inefficient Google apps and services, thereby reducing Android's overall memory usage. Additionally, 4.4 was designed to be more aggressive in managing memory, helping to guard against apps wasting too much memory.

== Features ==
=== User experience ===
The overall interface of KitKat further downplays the "Holo" interface appearance introduced on 4.0, replacing remaining instances of blue accenting with grays and white (such as the status bar icons), and getting rid of the Wi-Fi upstream and downstream traffic indicators (triangles pointing up and down), though they can still be seen in the quick control center menu.

The Wi-Fi icon colour when only a connection to an access point with no Internet access has been changed from grey to orange.

The appearance may vary across custom vendor distributions, such as TouchWiz.

Apps may trigger a translucent status and navigation bar appearance, or trigger a full-screen mode ("Immersive mode") to hide them entirely. The launcher also received a refreshed appearance, with translucent navigation bars and a translucent backdrop replacing the black backdrop in the application drawer. Additionally, action overflow menu buttons in apps are always visible, even on devices with the deprecated "Menu" navigation key. In the Settings menu, users can now specify a default Home (launcher) and text messaging app.

On stock devices, the Messaging and Movie Studio apps were removed; the former was replaced by Google Hangouts, which supported SMS. The AOSP Gallery app was also deprecated in favor of Google+ Photos.

=== Platform ===
A new runtime environment known as the Android Runtime (ART), intended to replace the Dalvik virtual machine, was introduced as a technology preview in KitKat. ART is a cross-platform runtime which supports the x86, ARM, and MIPS architectures in both 32-bit and 64-bit environments. Unlike Dalvik, which uses just-in-time compilation (JIT), ART compiles apps upon installation, which are then run exclusively from the compiled version from then on. This technique eliminates the processing overhead of JIT, improving system performance.

Devices with 512 MB of RAM or less report as "low RAM" devices. Using an API, apps can detect low-RAM devices and adjust their functionality accordingly. KitKat also supports zram. WebView components were updated to utilize a version of the Google Chrome rendering engine. A new Storage Access Framework API allows apps to retrieve files consistently; as part of the framework, a new system file picker (branded as "Documents") allows users to access files from various sources (including those exposed by apps, such as online storage services).

A public API was introduced for creating and managing text messaging clients. Sensor batching, step detection, and counter APIs were also added. KitKat supports host card emulation for near-field communications, which allows apps to emulate a smart card for activities such as mobile payments.

This version also introduced official support for IR blasters API.

== See also ==
- Android version history
- iOS 7
- Windows Phone 8
- Windows 8.1
- OS X Mavericks
