= Android Marshmallow =

2015 Android mobile operating system

- Version of the Android operating system

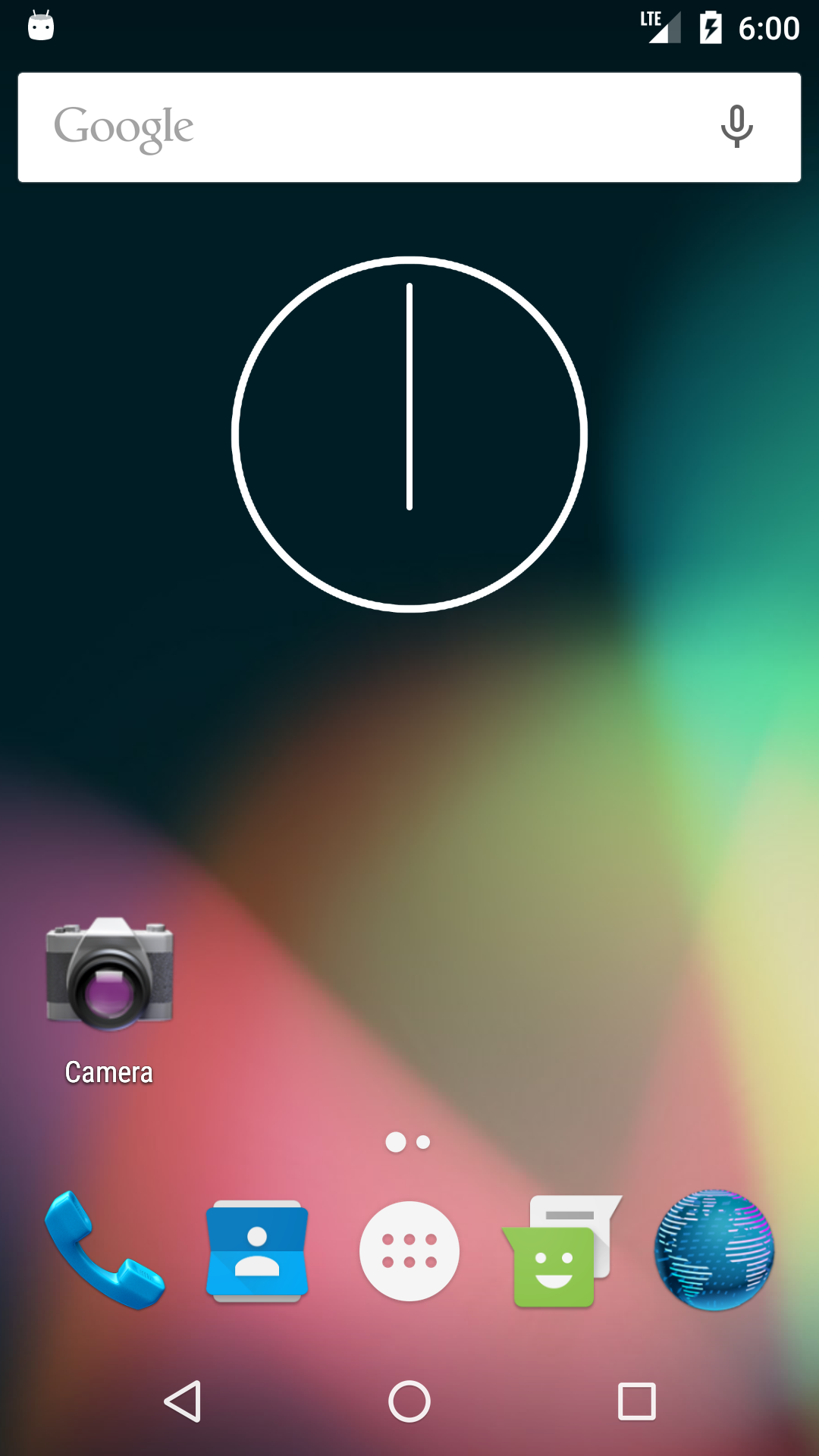
- Android Marshmallow running on a Nexus 5
- Developer: Google
- Released to manufacturing: August 17, 2015; 11 years ago
- General availability: September 29, 2015; 11 years ago (as Android 6.0) December 7, 2015; 10 years ago (as Android 6.0.1)
- Final release: 6.0.1_r81 (MOI10E) / October 1, 2017; 9 years ago
- Kernel type: Monolithic (Linux)
- Preceded by: Android Lollipop (5.x)
- Succeeded by: Android Nougat (7.x)
- Official website: www.android.com/versions/marshmallow-6-0/

Support status
- Unsupported as of August 6, 2018; Google Play Services support dropped since July 2026

Android Marshmallow (codenamed Android M during development) is the sixth major version of the Android operating system developed by Google, being the successor to Android Lollipop. It was announced at Google I/O on May 28, 2015, and released the same day as a beta, before being officially released on September 29, 2015. It was succeeded by Android Nougat on August 22, 2016.

Android Marshmallow primarily focuses on improving the overall user experience of its predecessor. It introduced a new opt-in permissions architecture, new APIs for contextual assistants (first used by a new feature "Now on Tap" to provide context-sensitive search results), a new power management system that reduces background activity when a device is not being physically handled, native support for fingerprint recognition and USB-C connectors, the ability to migrate data and applications to a microSD card, and other internal changes.

Android Marshmallow saw low adoption, with 13.3% of Android devices running it by July 2016. Usage of Android Marshmallow steadily increased since then, and by August 2017, 35.21% of Android devices ran Marshmallow, before receding. As of January 2026, 1.62% of Android devices ran Marshmallow. Security updates for Android Marshmallow ended in August 2018. On 30 July 2026, Google Play Services support for Android Marshmallow was dropped.

== History ==
Android Marshmallow was internally codenamed "Macadamia Nut Cookie". The first developer preview build for Android Marshmallow, codenamed Android "M", was unveiled and released at Google I/O on May 28, 2015, for the Nexus 5 and Nexus 6 smartphones, the Nexus 9 tablet, and the Nexus Player set-top box. The second developer preview was released on July 9, 2015, and the third and final preview was released on August 17, 2015, along with announcing that Android M would be titled Android "Marshmallow".

On September 29, 2015, Google unveiled launch devices for Marshmallow: the LG-produced Nexus 5X, the Huawei-produced Nexus 6P, alongside Google's own Pixel C tablet.

Android 6.0 updates and factory images for Nexus 5, 6, 7 (2013), 9, and Player were released on October 5, 2015. Older Nexus devices, including the Nexus 4, Nexus 7 (2012) and Nexus 10, did not receive an official update. On October 14, 2015, LG announced that it planned to release Marshmallow for its flagship LG G4 smartphone in Poland the following week, marking the first third-party device to receive an update to Android Marshmallow.

Android 6.0.1, a software patch featuring security fixes, support for Unicode 8.0 emoji (although without supporting skin tone extensions for human emoji), and the return of the "until next alarm" feature in Do Not Disturb mode, was released on December 7, 2015.

== System features ==
=== User experience ===
A new "Assist" API allows information from a currently opened app, including text and a screenshot of the current screen, to be sent to a designated "assistant" application for analysis and processing. This system is used by the Google Search app feature "Google Now on Tap", which allows users to perform searches within the context of information currently being displayed on-screen. While the "Home" button was used in Android 5 to show available apps, the "Home" button is used now (together with a voice command) to generate on-screen cards which display information, suggestions, and actions related to the content. "Direct Share" allows Share menus to display recently used combinations of contacts and an associated app as direct targets.

=== Adoptable storage ===
The new "Adoptable storage" feature allows a newly inserted SD card or other secondary storage media to be optionally designated as "internal" rather than "portable" storage.

"Portable" storage is the default behavior in previous Android versions, treating the media as a secondary storage device for user files. Storage media can be removed or replaced without repercussions, but user-installed apps are restricted to writing to their respective package-name directories under Android/data. This restriction was introduced in Android 4.4 KitKat. The Storage Access Framework, through which shared writing access to memory cards has been reinstated in Android 5.0 Lollipop, is backwards-incompatible and slower due to latencies.

When designated as "Internal" storage, the storage media is reformatted with an encrypted ext4 file system, and is "adopted" by the operating system as an extension of the primary storage partition. Existing data (including applications and "private" data folders) is migrated to external storage, and the device's regular operation becomes dependent on the media's presence. Apps and operating system functions will not function properly if the adopted storage device is removed, and the card cannot be reused in other devices until reformatted. If the user loses access to the storage media, the adopted storage can be "forgotten", which makes the data permanently inaccessible.

Not all OEMs support this feature, including LG and Samsung in particular; Samsung cited the potential for user confusion and data loss.

=== Platform ===
Android Marshmallow introduces a redesigned application permissions model; apps are no longer automatically granted all of their specified permissions at installation time. An opt-in system is now used, prompting users to grant or deny individual permissions (such as camera or microphone access) to an application when they are needed for the first time. Applications remember the grants, which the user can revoke at any time. The new permissions model is used only by applications developed for Marshmallow using its software development kit (SDK), and older apps will continue to use the previous all-or-nothing approach. Permissions can still be revoked for those apps, though this might prevent them from working properly, and a warning is displayed to that effect.

Marshmallow introduces new power management schemes known as "Doze" and "App Standby"; when running on battery power, a device will enter a low-power state if it is inactive and not being physically handled. In this state, network connectivity and background processing are restricted, and only "high-priority" notifications are processed. Additionally, network access by apps is deferred if the user has not recently interacted with the app. Apps may request a permission to exempt themselves from these policies, but will be rejected from Google Play Store as a violation of its "Dangerous Products" policy if their core functionality is not "adversely affected" by them.

Android Marshmallow provides native support for fingerprint recognition on supported devices via a standard API, allowing third-party applications to implement fingerprint-based authentication. Fingerprints can be used to unlock devices and authenticate Play Store and Google Pay purchases. Android Marshmallow supports USB-C, including the ability to instruct devices to charge another device over USB. Marshmallow also introduces "verified links" that can be configured to open directly in their specified application without further user prompts. User data for apps targeting Marshmallow can be automatically backed up to Google Drive over Wi-Fi. Each application receives up to 25 MB of storage, which is separate from a user's Google Drive storage allotment.

As of Marshmallow, the Android Compatibility Definition Document includes new security mandates for devices, requiring that devices capable of accessing encrypted data without affecting performance enable secure boot and device encryption by default. These conditions comprise part of a specification that must be met to be certified for the operating system, and be able to license Google Mobile Services software. The requirement for mandatory device encryption was initially intended to take effect on Lollipop, but was delayed due to performance issues.

== See also ==
- Android version history
