= KEUN =

KEUN may refer to:

- KEUN (AM), a radio station (1490 AM) licensed to Eunice, Louisiana, United States
- KEUN-FM, a radio station (105.5 FM) licensed to Eunice, Louisiana, United States

People with the surname Keun include:

- Hendrik Keun (1738–1787), painter from the northern Netherlands
- Irmgard Keun (1905–1982), German author
- Odette Keun (1888–1978), Dutch adventurer, journalist and writer

== See also ==
- Geun, a Korean name sometimes spelled Keun
- KUEN, a television station licensed to Ogden, Utah, United States
