= EUN =

EUN may refer to:

- Eun, Korean surname
- Eun (Korean given name)
- Eunos MRT station (station abbreviation)
- Hassan I Airport (IATA code)
- Unified Team at the Olympics
- Unified Team at the Paralympics
