= Byun =

- Hangul: 변
- Hanja: 卞; 邊; 變
- RR: Byeon
- MR: Pyŏn

Byeon (Korean: 변), also often spelled as Byun or Pyone is a Korean family name. According to the 2015 South Korean census, there were 138,802 people with this family name. It is written with three different hanja. In a study by the National Institute of the Korean Language based on 2007 application data for South Korean passports, it was found that 70.4% of people with this surname spelled it in Latin letters as Byun in their passports, while the rest spelled it with various other romanizations.

== Notable people ==
Notable people with this surname include:

=== Byeon ===
- Byeon Chang-heum (born 1964), South Korean educator and politician
- Byeon Jin-su (born 1993), South Korean baseball player
- Byeon Jun-byum (born 1991), South Korean footballer
- Byeon Sang-byeok, Joseon painter
- Byeon Sang-su (born 1964), South Korean canoeist
- Byeon Sung-wan (born 1965), South Korean politician
- Byeon Woo-seok (born 1991), South Korean actor
- Byeon Yeong-ro (1898–1961), South Korean poet
- Byeon Yung-jeon (1940–2025), South Korean politician

=== Byun ===
- Byun Baekhyun (born 1992), South Korean singer and actor, member of boy band Exo
- Byun Byung-joo (born 1961), South Korean former footballer
- Byun Chun-sa (born 1987), South Korean short track speed skater, Olympic gold medalist
- Byun Eun-jong (better known as JJu, born 1983), South Korean retired StarCraft pro gamer and poker player
- Byun Hee-bong (1942–2023), South Korean actor
- Byun Ho-young (born 1945), South Korean former footballer
- Byun Hui-su (1998–2021), the first known transgender soldier in South Korea
- Byun Hye-young (born 1983), South Korean former swimmer
- Byun Hyuk (born 1966), South Korean film director and screenwriter
- Byun Jae-sub (born 1975), South Korean footballer
- Byun Jang-ho (1940–2022), South Korean film director
- Byun Ji-hyun (born 1999), South Korean former competitive figure skater
- Byun Jung-il (born 1968), South Korean former professional boxer
- Byun Jung-soo (born 1974), South Korean model and actress
- Son Yeo-eun (born Byun Na-yeon, 1983), South Korean actress
- Byun Se-jong (born 1998), South Korean figure skater
- Byun Sung-hwan (born 1979), South Korean retired footballer
- Byun Woong (born 1986), South Korean footballer
- Byun Yo-han (born 1986), South Korean actor
- Byun Young-joo (born 1966), South Korean film director
- Byun Young-joon (born 1984), South Korean racewalker

=== Pyon ===
- Pyŏn Hyomun (1396–?), Joseon diplomat
- Pyon In-son (born 1946), North Korean politician
- Pyon Kwang-sun (born 1986), North Korean artistic gymnast
- Pyon Rye-yong (born 2001), North Korean artistic gymnast
- Pyon Yong-rip (1929–2016), North Korean politician
- Pyon Yong-tae (1892–1969), South Korean politician
