= Gil (Korean surname) =

- Hangul: 길
- Hanja: 吉
- RR: Gil
- MR: Kil

Gil or Kil (Korean: 길) is a Korean family name. The 2015 South Korean census found that there were 38,173 people with this family name. The most well-known clan is the Haepyeong Gil clan.

== People ==
Korean people with this surname include:

- Kil Chae (1353–1419), Korean scholar-official
- Gil Eun-hye (born 1988), South Korean actress
- Gil Hae-yeon (born 1964), South Korean actress
- Gil Hak-mi (born 1989), South Korean singer
- Gil Seon-ju (1869–1935), Korean Christian leader
- Gil Seong-joon (stage name Gill, born 1977), South Korean singer and television personality
- Gil Won-ok (1928–2025), South Korean activist
- Kil Yong-woo (born 1955), South Korean actor
- Gil Young-ah (born 1970), South Korean former badminton player
- Gil Young-tae (born 1991), South Korean footballer
