= Pyo (surname) =

- Hangul: 표
- Hanja: 表, 俵
- RR: Pyo
- MR: P'yo

Pyo (Korean: 표), also spelled Phyo, is a Korean family name. The 2015 South Korean census found that there were 30,749 people bearing the surname. Most people with this surname belong to the Sinchang Pyo clan.

Notable people with this surname include:

- Ani Phyo (born 1968), Canadian-born American organic chef and author
- Pyo Chang-won (born 1966), South Korean politician
- Helen Cha-Pyo, South Korean-born American conductor and organist
- Pyo Hyeon-gi (born 1933), South Korean boxer
- Pyo Hyun-myung (born 1958), South Korean businessman
- Pyo Jeong-min (born 2002), South Korean curler
- Pyo Ji-hoon (stage name P.O, born 1993), South Korean rapper, singer, actor
- Pyo Mu-won (1925–2006), North Korean military officer and politician
- Rejina Pyo (born 1983), South Korean fashion designer
- Pyo Seung-ju (born 1992), South Korean volleyball player
- Pyo Un-suk (born 1981), North Korean long-distance runner
- Pyo Ye-jin (born 1992), South Korean actress
- Pyo Yeong-jae (born 1972), South Korean voice actor
- Phyo Yong-myong (born 1989), North Korean figure skater
