= Sunwoo (Korean surname) =

- Hangul: 선우
- Hanja: 鮮于
- RR: Seonu
- MR: Sŏnu

Sunwoo (Korean: 선우), also spelled Seonu, Sŏnu, or Seonwoo, is a Korean surname.

One of the clans of this surname is Taewon Sunwoo clan. Its origin is Taiyuan, Shanxi, China. The 2000 South Korean census estimated that there were 3,560 people with this surname in South Korea, making it the second-most common two-syllable surname in the country.

People with this surname include:

- Sunwoo Eun-sook (born 1959), South Korean actress
- Seonu Hwi (1922–1986), South Korean author and novelist
- Sonu Hyang-hui, North Korean violinist, member of girl group Moranbong Band
- Sunwoo Jae-duk (born 1962), South Korean actor
- Sunwoo Jin (1922–2009), South Korean independence activist and politician
- Sunwoo Jung-a (born 1985), South Korean musician
- Sonu Kyong-sun (born 1983), North Korean football player
- Sunwoo Sun (born Jung Yoo-jin, 1975), South Korean actress
- Yekwon Sunwoo (born 1989), South Korean pianist
- Sunwoo Yong-nyeo (born Jung Yong-rye, 1945), South Korean actress

== See also ==
- Sun-woo, Korean given name
