= Je (surname) =

- Hangul: 제
- Hanja: 諸, 齊
- RR: Je
- MR: Che

Je (Korean: 제) is a rare Korean family name. The 2015 South Korean census found that there were only 21,988 people bearing the surname. It is written with two different hanja; the most common 諸, and the less common 齊. The most well-known clan is the Chirwon Je clan.

Notable people with this surname include:

- Je Jong-geel (born 1955), South Korean politician
- Je Jong-hyun (born 1991), South Korean footballer
- Je Yong-sam (born 1972), South Korean retired footballer
