= Dje (disambiguation) =

Dje is a letter of the Cyrillic script.

Dje, Djé, or DJE can also refer to:

- Djé Tavares (born 2003), Cape Verdean footballer
- Ludovic Djé (born 1977), a French footballer
- Zarma language, a language spoken in Niger, by ISO 639 code
- Djerba–Zarzis International Airport, an airport in Djerba, Tunisia, by IATA code

== See also ==
- Je (disambiguation)
- G (disambiguation)
