= In (Korean name) =

In (Korean: 인) is an uncommon Korean family name and a Korean given name.

== Family name ==
As a family name, In may be written with one hanja, meaning "mark" or "seal" (印; 도장 인). It has two clans: Kyodong, which is an island in Incheon and Yonan, North Korea. The 2000 South Korean census found 20,635 people with this family name. In a study by the National Institute of the Korean Language based on 2007 application data for South Korean passports, it was found that 86.9% of people with this surname spelled it in Latin letters as In in their passports. Alternative spellings (the remaining 13.1%) included Yin and Ihn.

People with this family name include:

- In Jae-keun (born 1953), South Korean democracy activist
- Ihn Yo-han (born John Linton, 1959), American-South Korean physician and politician
- In Chang-soo (born 1972), South Korean-Argentinian footballer and coach
- In Gyo-jin (born 1980), South Korean actor
- In Joon-yeon (born 1991), South Korean footballer
- In Kyo-don (born 1992), South Korean taekwondo practitioner
- Inn Hyo-ri (born 2000), South Korean singer, member of girl group Mimiirose

== Given name ==
People with the given name In include:

- Song In (died 1126), Goryeo dynasty male civil official
- Hwangbo In (died 1453), Joseon dynasty male civil official
- Kim In (1943–2021), South Korean male Go player
- Lee In (volleyball) (born 1952), South Korean male volleyball player
- Lee In (actor) (born 1984), South Korean male actor
- Cui Ren (Korean name Choe In, born 1989), Chinese football player of Korean descent

== See also ==
- List of Korean family names
- List of Korean given names
