= List of Korean surnames =

This is a list of Korean surnames, in Hangul alphabetical order. See Korean name § Surnames for an explanation.

The most common Korean surname (particularly in South Korea) is Kim (Korean: 김; Hanja: 金), followed by Lee (이; 李) and Park (박; 朴). These three surnames are held by around half of the ethnic Korean population.

This article uses the most recent South Korean statistics (currently 2015) as the basis. No such data are available from North Korea.

== From 2015 South Korean statistics ==
As of 2015, at least 191 distinct surnames in Hangul and 514 distinct surnames in Hanja were in use.

Hangul	Hanja	RR	MR	Other romanizations	Population (2015)	Percentage
가	賈, 價	Ga	Ka	Kah, Kha, Gha	9,950	0.02%
간	簡, 間	Gan	Kan	Khan, Kahn, Kann	2,525	0.0051%
갈	葛	Gal	Kal	Gar, Karl	2,086	0.0042%
감	甘	Gam	Kam	Kahm, Kang, Gahm	6,024	0.0121%
강	姜, 康, 強, 江, 剛, 㝩	Gang	Kang	Khang, Kahng, Kwang, Ghang, Kaing	1,269,290	2.5536%
견	甄, 堅	Gyeon	Kyŏn	Kyun, Kyeon, Kyoun, Gyun, Kyon	1,684	0.0034%
경	慶, 景, 京, 耿	Gyeong	Kyŏng	Kyung, Kyoung, Geong, Guong, Gyeng	16,958	0.0341%
계	桂, 季	Gye	Kye	Kae, Kay, Keh, Key, Gae	6,641	0.0134%
고	高, 顧	Go	Ko	Koh, Goh, Kho, Gho, Koo	471,429	0.9484%
곡	曲, 谷	Gok	Kok	Koock	101	0.0002%
공	孔, 公	Gong	Kong	Kohng, Ghong, Con, Gohng, Goung	92,340	0.1858%
곽	郭, 廓, 槨	Gwak	Kwak	Kwag, Kwack, Gwag, Koak, Koag	203,365	0.4091%
관	關, 管	Gwan	Kwan		20	0%
교	橋, 喬	Gyo	Kyo		26	0.0001%
구	具, 丘, 邱, 仇	Gu	Ku	Koo, Goo, Kuh, Kou, Khu	208,550	0.4196%
국	鞠, 鞫, 菊, 國, 麴	Guk	Kuk	Kook, Gook, Kug, Cook, Koog	20,768	0.0418%
궁	弓, 宮	Gung	Kung	Koong, Goong, Koung	572	0.0012%
궉	鴌	Gwok	Kwŏk	Kwok, Kweok, Kwoc	183	0.0004%
권	權, 勸, 㩲, 券	Gwon	Kwŏn	Kwon, Kweon, Kwun, Gweon, Kwan	706,212	1.4208%
근	斤	Geun	Kŭn	Keun, Gun	170	0.0003%
금	琴, 金, 芩, 禁	Geum	Kŭm	Keum, Kum, Gum, Kuem, Guem	25,472	0.0512%
기	奇, 寄, 箕, 紀	Gi	Ki	Kee, Key, Kie, Kih, Gee	29,062	0.0585%
길	吉	Gil	Kil	Gill, Gihl, Khil, Keel, Kill	38,173	0.0768%
김	金, 钅 [sic]	Gim	Kim	Ghim, Kin	10,689,967	21.5065%
나	羅 (Note: 라; Ra in North Korea.), 蘿, 邏, 罗, 那	Na	Na	Ra, La, Nah, Rha, Rah	161,015	0.3239%
난	欒 (Note: 란; Ran in North Korea.)	Nan	Nan	An	8	0%
남	南, 男	Nam	Nam	Nahm, Nham, Nan, Lam, Narm	275,659	0.5546%
남궁	南宮, 南宫	Namgung	Namgung	Namkung, Namkoong, Namgoong, Namgoung, Namkoung	21,313	0.0429%
낭	浪 (Note: 랑; Rang in North Korea.)	Nang	Nang	Lang	181	0.0004%
내	乃, 奈	Nae	Nae		374	0.0008%
노	盧 (Note: 로; Ro in North Korea.), 魯, 蘆, 路, 虜, 卢, 努	No	No	Noh, Roh, Ro, Rho, Nho	315,372	0.6345%
뇌	雷 (Note: 뢰; Roe in North Korea.)	Noe	Noe	Noi, Lei	19	0%
다	多	Da	Ta		7	0%
단	段, 單	Dan	Tan	Dahn, Dhan	1,632	0.0033%
담	譚	Dam	Tam	Tan	47	0.0001%
당	唐	Dang	Tang	Dhang	1,146	0.0023%
대	大, 代, 戴	Dae	Tae	Dai, Dea	669	0.0013%
도	都, 陶, 道, 到, 度, 桃, 覩	Do	To	Doh, Dho, Doe, Toh, Doo	57,946	0.1166%
독	獨	Dok	Tok		17	0%
독고	獨孤	Dokgo	Tokko	Dokko, Dockko, Dogko, Dockgo, Dohkgoh	502	0.001%
돈	頓	Don	Ton		117	0.0002%
동	董, 蕫, 童, 東, 薫	Dong	Tong	Dhong, Doung	5,936	0.0119%
동방	東方	Dongbang	Tongbang		180	0.0004%
두	杜	Du	Tu	Doo, Do, Dou, Dow	6,428	0.0129%
등	滕, 鄧	Deung	Tŭng		20	0%
등정	藤井	Deungjeong	Tŭngjŏng		5	0%
라	羅, 蘿, 邏	Ra	Ra	Na, La, Rha, Rah, Nah	25,974	0.0523%
란	欒	Ran	Ran		10	0%
랑	浪	Rang	Rang		125	0.0003%
려	呂	Ryeo	Ryŏ		19	0%
로	路, 魯, 盧	Ro	Ro		67	0.0001%
뢰	雷	Roe	Roe		19	0%
류	柳, 劉, 㧕	Ryu	Ryu	Yoo, Ryoo, Yu, You, Lyu	163,994	0.3299%
리	李	Ri	Ri		240	0.0005%
림	林	Rim	Rim		47	0.0001%
마	馬, 麻	Ma	Ma	Mah, Mar, Mach, Mha	39,196	0.0789%
만	萬	Man	Man	Mahn, Mhan	124	0.0002%
망절	網切	Mangjeol	Mangjŏl	Mangjul	8	0%
매	梅	Mae	Mae	Mai, Mea, Mei	201	0.0004%
맹	孟	Maeng	Maeng	Meang, Mang, Maing, Meng, Meing	22,028	0.0443%
명	明	Myeong	Myŏng	Myung, Myoung, Myong, Moung, Myoeng	29,110	0.0586%
모	牟, 毛, 慕	Mo	Mo	Moh, Mho, Moo, Moe, Meo	21,912	0.0441%
목	睦, 穆	Mok	Mok	Mock, Mog, Mook, Mork, Mouk	8,859	0.0178%
묘	苗	Myo	Myo		21	0%
무	武	Mu	Mu		15	0%
무본	武本	Mubon	Mubon		6	0%
묵	墨	Muk	Muk	Mook, Mok, Moog	172	0.0003%
문	文, 門	Mun	Mun	Moon, Mon, Moun, Muhn, Moom	464,047	0.9336%
미	米	Mi	Mi	Mee	16	0%
민	閔, 民, 敏, 珉, 悶, 旻	Min	Min	Minn, Mihn, Meen, Mheen, Mean	171,799	0.3456%
박	朴, 博	Bak	Pak	Park, Pack, Bark, Bag, Papk	4,192,080	8.4338%
반	潘, 班	Ban	Pan	Bahn, Van, Bhan, Barn, Pahn	28,223	0.0568%
방	方, 房, 龐, 邦, 防, 旁, 芳	Bang	Pang	Bhang, Bahng, Barng, Baang, Fang	129,559	0.2607%
배	裵, 輩, 培, 背, 配	Bae	Pae	Bea, Bai, Pai, Be, Bay	400,669	0.8061%
백	白, 百, 伯, 柏	Baek	Paek	Back, Baik, Paik, Beak, Baeg	382,447	0.7694%
번	樊	Beon	Pŏn		6	0%
범	范, 範	Beom	Pŏm	Bum, Buhm, Beum, Bom, Burm	3,838	0.0077%
변	卞, 邊, 變	Byeon	Pyŏn	Byun, Byon, Byoun, Pyun, Byen	138,802	0.2792%
보	寶, 保, 甫	Bo	Po		16	0%
복	卜	Bok	Pok	Bog, Bock, Pock, Boc, Bouk	9,538	0.0192%
봉	奉, 鳳	Bong	Pong	Vong	12,959	0.0261%
부	夫, 付, 傅, 富	Bu	Pu	Boo, Poo, Vu, Booh, Buh	10,604	0.0213%
비	丕	Bi	Pi	Vy, Vi, Bie, Bee	16	0%
빈	賓, 彬, 賔, 濱, 貧	Bin	Pin	Been, Bhin, Bean, Vin, Bihn	5,782	0.0116%
빙	氷	Bing	Ping		763	0.0015%
사	史, 司, 謝, 舍, 沙	Sa	Sa	Sha, Sah, Sar	10,998	0.0221%
사공	司空, 司公	Sagong	Sagong	Sakong, Shakong, Sagoung, Sagung	4,488	0.009%
산	山	San	San		9	0%
삼	森, 杉	Sam	Sam		38	0.0001%
상	尙, 常, 尚, 商	Sang	Sang	Shang, Sahng, Sarng	2,416	0.0049%
서	徐, 俆, 西, 書, 緖	Seo	Sŏ	Suh, Su, Sur, So, Sea	752,233	1.5134%
서문	西門, 西問	Seomun	Sŏmun	Seomoon, Suhmoon, Seamoon, Sumoon, Semun	2,044	0.0041%
석	石, 昔, 釋, 席	Seok	Sŏk	Suk, Seog, Sok, Suck, Seuk	60,607	0.1219%
선	宣, 鮮, 善	Seon	Sŏn	Sun, Son, Shun, Sen, Suhn	42,842	0.0862%
선우	鮮于, 鮮宇, 蘚于, 鮮牛	Seonu	Sŏnu	Sunwoo, Seonwoo, Sonu, Sunoo, Sunu	3,648	0.0073%
설	薛, 偰, 楔, 辥, 雪, 卨	Seol	Sŏl	Sul, Seul, Sol, Sel, Seal	45,692	0.0919%
섭	葉	Seop	Sŏp	Seoub, Sub, Sup	75	0.0002%
성	成, 盛, 宬, 星, 城	Seong	Sŏng	Sung, Soung, Seoung, Seung, Song	199,160	0.4007%
소	蘇, 邵, 肖, 蕭, 小, 卲, 所, 昭, 簫	So	So	Soh, Sho, Soo, Seo, Sou	53,856	0.1083%
손	孫, 遜, 損, 蓀	Son	Son	Sohn, Shon, Sun, Soun, Soon	457,356	0.9201%
송	宋, 松, 送	Song	Song	Soung, Shong, Sohng, Sung, Seung	683,521	1.3751%
수	隋, 水, 洙	Su	Su		47	0.0001%
순	荀, 筍, 舜, 淳, 順, 旬	Sun	Sun	Soon	1,237	0.0025%
승	承, 昇	Seung	Sŭng	Sung, Seoung, Seong, Sheung, Soeung	3,430	0.0069%
시	施, 柴, 時	Si	Si	Shi, See, Sea, Se	4,354	0.0088%
신	申, 辛, 愼, 莘, 新, 信, 伸	Sin	Sin	Shin, Sheen, Sihn, Shinn, Synn	986,001	1.9837%
심	沈, 沁, 深, 心	Sim	Sim	Shim, Sym, Seem, Sem, Sihm	272,049	0.5473%
아	阿	A	A	Ah	529	0.0011%
안	安, 顔, 案	An	An	Ahn, Ann, Anh, Ane, Aun	685,688	1.3795%
애	艾	Ae	Ae	Ai	24	0%
야	夜	Ya	Ya	Yha	77	0.0002%
양	梁 (Note: 량; Ryang in North Korea.), 楊, 粱, 揚, 陽, 洋, 杨, 樑, 樣	Yang	Yang	Ryang, Yaung, Young, Yahng, Yhang	530,554	1.0674%
어	魚, 漁	Eo	Ŏ	Uh, Eoh, Auh, Eu, Au	18,929	0.0381%
어금	魚金	Eogeum	Ŏgŭm	Eokum, Eokeum, Akeum, Uhkum	8	0%
엄	嚴, 儼, 严, 㘙	Eom	Ŏm	Um, Eum, Uhm, Aum, Om	144,660	0.291%
여	呂 (Note: 려; Ryeo; Ryŏ in North Korea.), 余, 黎	Yeo	Yŏ	Yuh, Yo, Yu, Yea, Yeu	80,672	0.1623%
연	延, 連 (Note: 련; Ryeon; Ryŏn in North Korea.), 燕, 涎	Yeon	Yŏn	Youn, Yun, Yon, Yeun, Yeoun	34,850	0.0701%
염	廉 (Note: 렴; Ryeom; Ryŏm in North Korea.), 閻, 簾	Yeom	Yŏm	Yum, Youm, Yeum, Yom, Yeoum	69,428	0.1397%
엽	葉	Yeop	Yŏp	Yub, Yup, Yop, Youb, Yeb	571	0.0011%
영	榮, 影	Yeong	Yŏng		24	0%
예	芮, 禮 (Note: 례; Rye in North Korea.), 倪, 藝	Ye	Ye	Yea, Yae, Yeh, Yee, Yei	13,587	0.0273%
오	吳, 伍, 吾, 五, 晤	O	O	Oh, Ou, Ohe, Oe, Olh	763,334	1.5357%
옥	玉	Ok	Ok	Ock, Og, Ohk, Oak, Ouk	25,107	0.0505%
온	溫	On	On	Ohn, Eon, Onn, Own, Yon	5,418	0.0109%
옹	邕, 雍	Ong	Ong	Ohng, Ohong, Ung	967	0.0019%
완	阮	Wan	Wan		6	0%
왕	王, 汪	Wang	Wang	Whang, Woang, Ywang, Yang, Whyang	25,581	0.0515%
요	姚	Yo	Yo		29	0.0001%
용	龍 (Note: 룡; Ryong in North Korea.)	Yong	Yong	Young, Lyong, Yung, Ryong, Yeong	15,276	0.0307%
우	禹, 于, 寓, 宇, 愚, 牛, 偶, 遇, 尤	U	U	Woo, Wu, Wo, Ou, Uh	195,729	0.3938%
운	雲, 芸	Un	Un	Woon	118	0.0002%
원	元, 袁, 原, 阮, 苑, 院, 圓	Won	Wŏn	Weon, Woon, One, Wone, Woun	130,174	0.2619%
위	魏, 韋, 衛, 偉	Wi	Wi	Wee, We, Wie, Wei, Wui	32,191	0.0648%
유	柳 (Note: 류; Ryu in North Korea.), 劉, 兪, 庾, 枊, 杻 (Note: 뉴; Nyu in North Korea.), 有, 楡, 由, 裕	Yu	Yu	Yoo, You, Ryu, Ryoo, Lyu	963,498	1.9384%
육	陸 (Note: 륙; Ryuk in North Korea.)	Yuk	Yuk	Yook, Youk, Yug, Yuck, Ryuk	23,455	0.0472%
윤	尹, 允, 潤	Yun	Yun	Yoon, Youn, Yune, Yeun, Yon	1,020,564	2.0532%
은	殷, 銀, 恩, 慇	Eun	Ŭn	Un, En, Een, Uhan, Eyn	16,927	0.0341%
음	陰	Eum	Ŭm	Um, Em, Yum, Ehum, Ng	5,604	0.0113%
이	李 (Note: 리; Ri in North Korea.), 異, 伊, 利, 怡, 㛅	I	I	Lee, Yi, Rhee, Yee, Rhie	7,307,237	14.701%
인	印	In	In	Ihn, Yin, Inn, Leen, Lin	22,363	0.045%
임	林 (Note: 림; Rim in North Korea.), 任, 壬, 恁	Im	Im	Lim, Yim, Rim, Leem, Rhim	1,015,200	2.0424%
자	慈	Ja	Cha		75	0.0002%
장	張, 蔣, 章, 莊, 長, 將, 藏, 場, 裝, 臧, 葬, 壯, 庄, 张, 漿	Jang	Chang	Jhang, Zhang, Jahng, Zang, Jaung	1,021,107	2.0543%
전	全, 田, 錢, 戰	Jeon	Chŏn	Jun, Chun, Chon, Jeun, Cheon	749,266	1.5074%
점	占	Jeom	Chŏm	Jum	158	0.0003%
정	鄭, 丁, 程, 政, 桯, 定, 正, 情	Jeong	Chŏng	Jung, Chung, Joung, Chong, Cheong	2,407,601	4.8437%
제	諸, 齊	Je	Che	Jae, Jea, Jeh, Jye, Jee	21,988	0.0442%
제갈	諸葛, 諸* [sic], 諸曷, 諸渴	Jegal	Chegal	Jekal, Jaegal, Jaekal, Jeagal, Jeakal	5,735	0.0115%
조	趙, 曺, 調, 造, 赵, 刁, 朝	Jo	Cho	Joe, Joh, Jho, Jou, Zo	1,453,971	2.9252%
종	鍾, 宗	Jong	Chong		681	0.0014%
좌	左, 佐	Jwa	Chwa	Joa, Choa, Chua, Jua, Chaw	3,383	0.0068%
주	朱, 周, 主, 珠, 株	Ju	Chu	Joo, Choo, Jou, Zoo, Zhu	232,063	0.4669%
증	增, 曾	Jeung	Chŭng	Zeng, Tsang, Duong, Tseng, Cheng	18	0%
지	池, 智, 地, 遲	Ji	Chi	Jee, Gi, Gee, Chee, Jie	160,147	0.3222%
진	陳, 秦, 晋, 陣, 眞, 蔯, 進, 珍, 䄅, 陈	Jin	Chin	Jhin, Jean, Gin, Chen, Jeen	186,310	0.3748%
차	車, 次	Cha	Ch'a	Char, Tcha, Tchah, Chah, Tscha	194,788	0.3919%
창	昌, 倉	Chang	Ch'ang		1,095	0.0022%
채	蔡, 菜, 采	Chae	Ch'ae	Chai, Che, Chea, Cha, Choi	131,757	0.2651%
천	千, 天, 川	Cheon	Ch'ŏn	Chun, Chon, Chen, Choun, Cheun	121,927	0.2453%
초	楚, 初	Cho	Ch'o	Tcho	236	0.0005%
총	叢	Chong	Ch'ong		27	0.0001%
최	崔, 催, 寉, 最	Choe	Ch'oe	Choi, Choy, Che, Chai, Chae	2,340,582	4.7089%
추	秋, 鄒	Chu	Ch'u	Choo, Chou, Cho, Chue, Chew	60,561	0.1218%
탁	卓	Tak	T'ak	Tark, Tag, Tack, Tahk, Thak	21,099	0.0424%
탄	彈	Tan	T'an	Than, Tahn, Tran	149	0.0003%
탕	湯	Tang	T'ang		5	0%
태	太, 泰	Tae	T'ae	Tai, Tea, Te, Thae	9,073	0.0183%
판	判	Pan	P'an		278	0.0006%
팽	彭	Paeng	P'aeng	Paing, Peang, Pang, Peng, Phang	2,935	0.0059%
편	片	Pyeon	P'yŏn	Pyun, Pyon, Pyoun, Pyen, Pyeun	16,689	0.0336%
평	平	Pyeong	P'yŏng	Pyung, Pyoung, Pyong, Pyeoung	515	0.001%
포	包	Po	P'o		57	0.0001%
표	表, 俵	Pyo	P'yo	Phyo, Poy, Peo, Pho, Pou	30,749	0.0619%
풍	馮	Pung	P'ung	Poong, Poung	651	0.0013%
피	皮	Pi	P'i	Pee, Phee, Phi, Pe, Phie	6,578	0.0132%
필	弼, 畢	Pil	P'il	Phil, Fil, Peel	174	0.0004%
하	河, 夏, 何, 賀, 荷	Ha	Ha	Hah, Har, Hwa, Haa, Hagh	233,106	0.469%
학	郝	Hak	Hak		35	0.0001%
한	韓, 漢, 汗, 恨	Han	Han	Hahn, Hann, Haan, Khan, Hwan	773,537	1.5562%
함	咸	Ham	Ham	Hahm, Harm, Hamm, Haam, Hwam	80,659	0.1623%
해	海, 解	Hae	Hae		155	0.0003%
허	許, 许	Heo	Hŏ	Hur, Huh, Her, Hu, Ho	326,782	0.6574%
현	玄, 賢	Hyeon	Hyŏn	Hyun, Hyon, Hyoun, Hyen, Hyeun	88,831	0.1787%
형	邢, 刑, 形	Hyeong	Hyŏng	Hyung, Hyoung, Hyong, Hung, Houng	7,328	0.0147%
호	扈, 胡, 鎬, 虎, 湖	Ho	Ho	Hoh	5,853	0.0118%
홍	洪, 烘, 䜤, 弘, 㤨, 哄, 紅	Hong	Hong	Houng, Heung, Heong, Whong, Hohng	558,994	1.1246%
화	化	Hwa	Hwa	Wha, Hoa, Hua	915	0.0018%
황	黃, 皇, 潢, 荒, 晃, 煌, 簧	Hwang	Hwang	Whang, Hoang, Huang, Hang, Hawng	697,475	1.4032%
황목	荒木	Hwangmok	Hwangmok		5	0%
황보	皇甫, 黃甫	Hwangbo	Hwangbo	Whangbo, Hoangbo, Hwangpo, Whoangbo, Howangbo	10,427	0.021%
후	侯, 候, 后	Hu	Hu	Hou, Hoo, Hong, Who, Huu	74	0.0001%
Other					91,107	0.1833%

== From 2000 South Korean statistics ==
These are surnames that appear in the 2000 South Korean statistics but not in 2015. Since the 2015 statistics only lists surnames used by five or more people, these surnames may still exist.

Hangul	Hanja	RR	MR	Other romanizations	Population (2000)
강	彊	Gang	Kang	(see above)	13,328
강전	岡田	Gangjeon	Kangjŏn	Kangjun	51
개	介	Gae	Kae		86
군	君	Gun	Kun		46
뇌	賴	Noe	Noe	(see above)	12
누	樓 (Note: 루; Ru in North Korea.)	Nu	Nu		24
단	端	Dan	Tan	(see above)	34
돈	敦	Don	Ton	(see above)	21
두	頭	Du	Tu	(see above)	208
범	凡	Beom	Pŏm	(see above)	157
빙	冰	Bing	Ping	(see above)	726
소봉	小峰	Sobong	Sobong		18
십	辻	Sip	Sip		82
양	襄	Yang	Yang	(see above)	823
여	汝	Yeo	Yŏ	(see above)	358
영	永	Yeong	Yŏng	(see above)	132
예	乂	Ye	Ye	(see above)	1
장곡	長谷	Janggok	Changgok		52
저	邸	Jeo	Chŏ	Cho, Ji, Chu, Jo	48
준	俊	Jun	Chun	June	72
즙	辻	Jeup	Chŭp	Chup	4
초	肖	Cho	Ch'o	(see above)	70
춘	椿	Chun	Ch'un		77
편	扁	Pyeon	P'yŏn	(see above)	633
환	桓	Hwan	Hwan		157
흥	興	Heung	Hŭng	Hong, Huynh, Khuong	462

== Other surnames ==
=== Historical surnames ===
These surnames are found in historical texts and are no longer in use today.

Hangul	Hanja	RR	MR	References
고이	古爾	Goi	Koi	
명림	明臨	Myeongnim	Myŏngnim	
목	木	Mok	Mok	
목협	木劦	Mokhyeop	Mokhyŏp	
백	苩	Baek	Paek	
부여	扶餘	Buyeo	Puyŏ	
사마	司馬	Sama	Sama	
소실	少室	Sosil	Sosil	
수미	首彌	Sumi	Sumi	
여	餘	Yeo	Yŏ	
연	淵	Yeon	Yŏn	
우	優	U	U	
을	乙	Eul	Ŭl	
을지	乙支	Eulji	Ŭlchi	
조미	祖彌	Jomi	Chomi	
중실	仲室	Jungsil	Chungsil	
협	劦	Hyeop	Hyŏp	
혜	嵇	Hye	Hye	
흑치	黑齒	Heukchi	Hŭkch'i	

== See also ==
- Korean name
- Korean culture
- Korean language
- List of common Chinese surnames

== Notes ==
For these notes, see North–South differences in the Korean language.
