= Seon (Korean name) =

Seon (Korean: 선), also spelled Sun, is an uncommon Korean family name, as well as a Korean given name.

== Family name ==
As a family name, Seon may be written with either of two hanja, one meaning "to announce" (宣) and the other meaning "first" (先). Each has one bon-gwan: for the former, Boseong, Jeollanam-do, and for the latter, Jinseong, Jinju, Gyeongsangnam-do, both in what is today South Korea. The 2000 South Korean census found 38,849 people with these family names. In a study by the National Institute of the Korean Language based on 2007 application data for South Korean passports, it was found that 60.7% of people with this surname spelled it in Latin letters as Sun in their passports, while another 39.2% spelled it as Seon.

People with this family name include:

- Sun Dong-yeol (born 1963), South Korean baseball player
- Sun Ju-kyung (stage name Ugly Duck, born 1991), South Korean rapper and singer
- Sun Mi (born 1992), South Korean singer (changed her name to Lee Sun-mi)
- Sun Mi-sook (born 1968), South Korean volleyball player
- Sun Mu, 20th-century Korean painter
- Sun So-eun (born 1988), South Korean swimmer
- Sun Ye-in (born 1996), stage name Sunyoul, South Korean singer, member of UP10TION

== Given name ==
People with the given name Seon include:

- Seon of Balhae (fl. 818–830), 10th King of Balhae
- Kim Seon (fl. 10th century), minor lord of the early Goryeo Dynasty
- Jeong Seon (1676–1759), Joseon Dynasty landscape painter
- Sunwoo Sun (born Jung Yoo-jin, 1975), South Korean actress
- Chloe Kim (Korean name Kim Seon, born 2000), American snowboarder of Korean descent

== See also ==
- List of Korean given names
