= Namsadang cant =

Jargon used by Korean performers

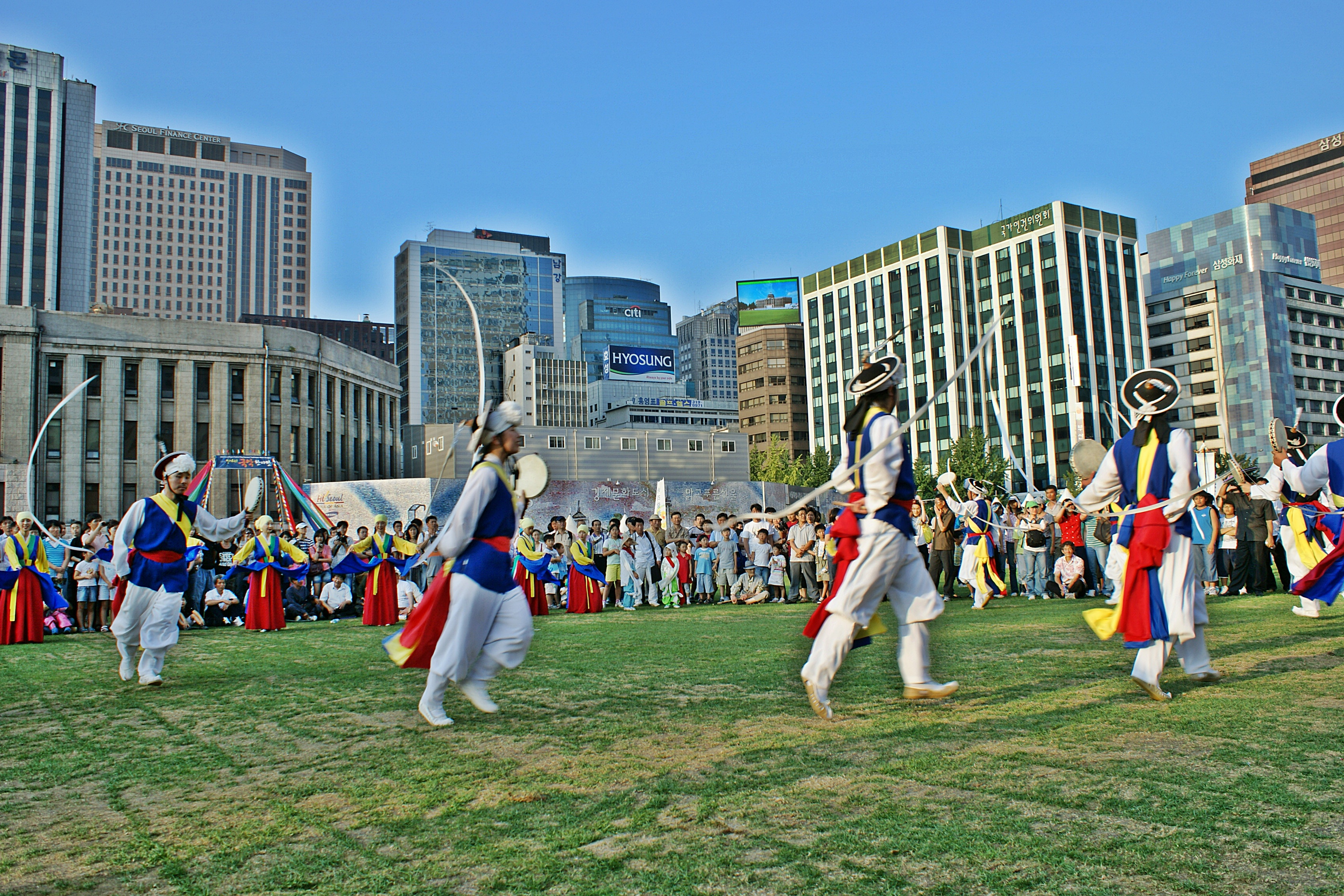
A performance by members of a Namsadang, the traditional users of this jargon.

The Namsadang cant (Korean: 남사당 은어; lit. 'Namsadang jargon') was a cant, or secret language, used by members of the Korean Namsadang performance art troupes. Although once widely used, decline in popularity of these troupes in the 20th century have led to much of the original jargon being forgotten, with only certain words surviving from those who remember parts and words from the jargon, who were often older or retired members of these troupes. Currently, with the re-establishment of the troupe Anseong, where the Namsadang originate from, there has been some renewed interest in the art, and thus the revival of the use and knowledge of some words in the community.

== History ==
The Namsadang was believed to have been created in the late Joseon Dynasty from groups of commoners and baekjeong, and were often quite popular among commoners as a form of entertainment. Having been detached from the rest of society due to their low status as entertainers, Namsadang members often had their own customs, titles and style of living. In order to secretly communicate between members of the troupe without the risk of being eavesdropped by the rest of the population, and to maintain secrets about the organisation and its members, the cant was created. Although the re-establishment of the company has allowed for some slang terms to be in use among current members, much of the original jargon has now been forgotten as many elderly members, many of whom have not been performing for years, often forget words and their meanings.

== Examples ==
Words in the jargon were often created through many different methods, many words were coined by pronouncing them backwards to confuse potential eavesdroppers, such as the words for tobacco (배담- baedam, in contrast to 담배- dambae), husband (방서- bangseo, rather than 서방- seobang) and shaman (단골- dangol, instead of 골단- goldan, a dialectal term for shaman). Scrambling of words can also be seen in terms for dokkaebi (개비도- gaebido, instead of 도깨비- dokkaebi) and Jeolla Province (라도절- ladojeol, instead of 전라도- Jeollado).

Words were also created by using other words and terms to allude to another meaning. Such words include the words for gun (검은대- geomeundae- literally 'black thing'), a dead person (녹은설- nogeunseol, literally 'frozen snow') and soup (흘림- heullim, literally spilling- a reference to how soup 'spills'.).

Interestingly, words for numbers, animals and surnames were also created. This includes the words for four (죽은- jugeun- literally 'death', a reference to how four is an unlucky number in east Asia), the surname Cheon (하늘세- haneulse, due to the surname and the hanja for sky; '天', being homonyms) and egg (벙어리사지-beongeorisaji).

Other unique vocabulary includes the words for spy (논달설- nondalseol, the 'seol' part appears in many words regarding people and figures), cooked rice (걸- geol) and watermelon (월냉이- Wolnaenggi).

== See also ==
- Korean dialects
- Korean culture
