= Song (Korean surname) =

- Hangul: 송
- Hanja: 宋, 松, 訟
- RR: Song
- MR: Song

Song is a Korean family name derived from the Chinese surname Song. Songs make up roughly 1.4% of the Korean population; the 2000 South Korean census found 622,208 in that country.

== Kinds ==
- Song (宋) family : Various Korean family name.
- Song (訟) family : unknown origin, later surname change to Seong (成) and became the Gangneung Seong clan.
- Song (松) family : the Song Yang (松讓) ethnicity in the Buyeo kingdom.

== Clans ==
Family seal of the Yeosan Song clan

Family seal of the Eunjin Song clan

Song (宋) clans include the Yeosan, Eunjin, Jincheon, Yeonan, Yaseong, Cheongju, Sinpyeong, Gimhae, Namyang and Bokheung.

One Song (松) clan is the Yong Song.

== List of people with the surname ==
=== Notable people of the past ===
- Song Deok-gi (1893–1977), taekkyeon master
- Song Hŭigyŏng (1376–1446), Joseon scholar-official
- Song In (died 1126), Goryeo official
- Queen Jeongsun (Danjong) (born 1440), consort of King Danjong of Joseon
- Song Jin-woo (1889–1945), Korean journalist, CEO of The Dong-A Ilbo, founder of the Korea Democratic Party
- Song Jun-gil (1606–1672), Joseon Dynasty politician and scholar
- Song Oh-kyun (1892–1970) Korean independence activist
- Song Sang-hyeon (1551–1592), Joseon writer and politician
- Song Si-yŏl (1607–1689), Joseon philosopher
- Song Yang, who surrendered to Dongmyeong of Goguryeo in 37 BCE
- Song Yi-kyun (1885–1927) Korean independence activist

=== Notable people of recent times ===
- Anna Song (born 1971), South Korean-born American politician
- Aree Song (born 1986), Thai-South Korean professional golfer
- Song Bo-bae (born 1986), South Korean professional golfer
- Song Byung-gu (born 1988), South Korean professional StarCraft player
- Cathy Song (born 1955), American poet
- Song Chang-eui (born 1979), South Korean actor
- Song Chang-ho (born 1986), South Korean footballer
- Song Chang-sik (born 1947), Korean singer
- Song Chong-gug (born 1979), South Korean retired footballer
- Song Dae-kwan (1946–2025), South Korean trot singer
- Song Dae-nam (born 1979), South Korean former judoka, Olympic gold medallist
- Daewon Song (born 1975), South Korean-born American professional skateboarder
- Song Do-yeong (born 1951), South Korean voice actress
- Song Dong-hwan (born 1980), South Korean ice hockey forward
- Song Dong-jin (born 1984), South Korean footballer
- Song Dong-wook (born 1962), South Korean tennis player
- Song Du-yul (born 1944), professor at University of Münster
- Song Geon-hee (born 1997), South Korean actor
- Song Gi-won (1947–2024), South Korean novelist
- Song Gisuk (1935–2021), South Korean writer
- Song Hae (1927–2022), South Korean TV host and singer
- Song Hae-sung (born 1964), South Korean film director and screenwriter
- Song Byeok (born 1969), North Korean painter
- Song Han-bok (born 1984), South Korean footballer
- Song Ho-young (born 1954), South Korean radiologist
- Song Ho-young (footballer) (born 1988), South Korean footballer
- Song Hye-kyo (born 1981), South Korean actress
- Song Hyeong-keun (born 1974), South Korean former professional tennis player
- Song Hyun-wook, South Korean film director
- Song I-han (born 1994), South Korean singer
- Song Il-gon (born 1971), South Korean film director and screenwriter
- Song Il-kook (born 1971), South Korean actor
- Song Il-soo (born 1950), Japanese former baseball player and manager
- Song In-young (born 1990), South Korean footballer
- Song Ja (born 1936), South Korean politician and academic, former Minister of Education
- Song Jae-hak (born 1955), South Korean poet and dentist
- Song Jae-hee (born 1979), South Korean actor
- Song Jae-ho (1937–2020), South Korean actor
- Song Jae-ho (fencer) (born 1990), South Korean fencer, Olympic bronze medallist
- Song Jae-jeong (born 1973), South Korean television screenwriter
- Song Jae-kun (born 1974), South Korean short track speed skater
- Song Jae-rim (1985–2024), South Korean actor and model
- Song Jae-ung (born 1945), South Korean diver
- Song Je-heon (born 1986), South Korean footballer
- Song Ji-eun (born 1990), South Korean singer and actress, former member of girl group Secret
- Song Ji-eun (handballer) (born 1996), South Korean handballer
- Song Ji-ho (born 1992), South Korean actor
- Song Ji-hyun (born 1969), South Korean handball player, Olympic gold medallist
- Song Ji-man (born 1973), South Korean baseball player
- Song Ji-na (born 1959), South Korean screenwriter
- Song Ji-woo (born 1997) ,South Korean actress
- Song Jin-hyung (born 1987), South Korean footballer
- Song Jin-woo (born 1966), South Korean baseball player
- Song Jong-sun (born 1981), North Korean footballer
- Song Joo-hee (stage name Alice, born 1990), South Korean singer and actress, former member of girl group Hello Venus
- Song Joon-seok (born 1974), South Korean voice actor
- Song Joong-ki (born 1985), South Korean actor
- Song Ju-hee (born 1977), South Korean football coach and former player
- Song Ju-seok (born 1967), South Korean former footballer
- Song Jung-hyun (born 1976), South Korean footballer
- Song Kang (born 1994), South Korean actor
- Song Kang-ho (born 1967), South Korean actor
- Song Kuk-hyang (born 2001), North Korean weightlifter
- Luke Song (born 1972), American fashion designer
- Song Mi-jin (born 1983), South Korean singer and actress
- Song Min-gi (born 1999), South Korean rapper, member of boy group Ateez
- Song Min-ho (born 1993), South Korean rapper, member of boy band Winner
- Song Min-jae (born 2012), South Korean actor
- Song Min-ji (born 1998), South Korean cyclist
- Song Min-soon (born 1948), South Korean politician and diplomat, former Minister of Foreign Affairs and Trade
- Song Myeong-seob (born 1984), South Korean taekwondo martial artist
- Song Nam-hyang (born 1996), North Korean professional diver
- Naree Song (born 1986), Thai-South Korean professional golfer
- Noah Song (born 1997), American professional baseball player
- Song Ok-joo (born 1965), South Korean politician
- Song Ok-sook (born 1960), South Korean actress
- Song Sae-byeok (born 1979), South Korean actor
- Sanghee Song (born 1970), South Korean artist
- Song Sang-hyun (born 1941), South Korean lawyer, former President of the International Criminal Court
- Song Seung-heon (born 1976), South Korean actor
- Song Seung-hyun (born 1992), South Korean former musician, former member of rock band F.T. Island
- Song Seung-jun (born 1980), South Korean former professional baseball player
- Song Seung-tae (born 1972), South Korean retired field hockey player
- Song Sin-do (1922–2017), South Korean human rights activist
- Song So-hee (born 1997), South Korean singer
- Song Soon-chun (born 1934), South Korean amateur boxer
- Song Suk-woo (born 1983), South Korean short-track speed skater
- Song Tae-kon (born 1986), South Korean professional Go player
- Song Tae-lim (born 1984), South Korean footballer
- Song Ui-young (born 1993), Singaporean professional footballer
- Song Yeong (1940–2016), South Korean writer
- Song Yo-chan (1918–1980), former Prime Minister of South Korea
- Song Yoo-geun (born 1997), South Korea's youngest university student
- Song Yoon-ah (born 1973), South Korean actress
- Song Young-gil (born 1963), South Korean politician
- Song Yun-hyeong (born 1995), South Korean singer, member of boy band iKON
- Song Yun-soo (born 1995), South Korean compound archer
- Song Yuvin (born 1998), South Korean singer and actor, former member of boy band MYTEEN

== See also ==
- List of Korean family names
- Korean name
- Song (Chinese name)
