= Kyun =

Kyun may refer to:

- KYUN, FM radio station in Twin Falls, Idaho
- "Kyun" (song), a 2019 single by Japanese group Hinatazaka46
- Kyun-Tas, a mountain range in Yakutia, Russia

== See also ==
- Kyung
