= Young-tae =

- Hangul: 영태
- RR: Yeongtae
- MR: Yŏngt'ae

Young-tae is a Korean given name.

People with this name include:

- Byeon Yeong-tae (1892–1969), South Korean politician, 5th Prime Minister
- Li Yongtai (1928–2015), Chinese politician and air force lieutenant general of Korean descent
- Young-Tae Chang (born 1968), South Korean chemistry professor
- Kim Young-tae (born 1975), South Korean weightlifter, represented South Korea at the 2000 Summer Olympics
- Ko Young-tae (born 1976), South Korean businessman and fencer
- Boo Young-tae (born 1985), South Korean football forward (K3 League)
- Gil Young-tae (born 1991), South Korean football centre-back (K-League Classic)

== See also ==
- List of Korean given names
