= Geum (Korean name) =

Geum (Korean: 금), also spelled Keum or Kum, is a rare Korean family name and a Korean given name. Most people bearing this surname belong to the Bonghwa Geum clan.

== Family name ==
As a family name, Geum may be written with four different hanja: 琴, 金, 芩, 禁. The 2015 South Korean census found that there were 25,472 people with this family name. People with this surname include:

- Geum Bo-ra (born 1961), South Korean actress
- Keum Dong-hyun (born 2003), South Korean singer, former member of boy band EPEX
- Geum Hannah (born 1987), South Korean actress
- Keum Ji-hyeon (born 2000), South Korean sport shooter, Olympic silver medalist
- Kum Jun-hyeon (born 2004), South Korean singer, member of boy band TIOT
- Geum Kyo-jin (born 1992), South Korean footballer
- Geum Min (born 1962), South Korean politician
- Keum Na-na (born 1983), South Korean author, beauty pageant titleholder, Miss Korea 2002
- Keum Sae-rok (born 1992), South Korean actress
- Keum Tae-sup (born 1967), South Korean politician and lawyer

== Given name ==
People with the given name Geum include:

- Yeongjo of Joseon (1694–1776), personal name Yi Kŭm

== See also ==
- List of Korean family names
- List of Korean given names
