= Sang (Korean name) =

Sang (Korean: 상) is a rare Korean family name and a Korean given name.

== Family name ==
As a family name, Sang may be written with only one hanja, meaning "yet" or "still" (尙; 오히려 상 ohiryeo sang). The 2000 South Korean Census found 2,298 people and 702 households with this family name. All but five of those listed a single bongwan (origin of a clan lineage, not necessarily the actual residence of clan members): Mokcheon (today Mokcheon-eup), Dongnam District, Cheonan, South Chungcheong Province. One person listed a different bongwan, while four others had their bongwan listed as unknown. They claim descent from Sang Guk-jin (상국진; 尙國珍), an official of the early Goryeo period who was born in Mokcheon and rose to the post of jangni (장리; 長吏) there.

== Given name ==
People with the given name Sang include:

- Yi Sang (1910–1937), birth name Kim Haikyung, Korean writer of the Japanese colonial period
- Ku Sang (1919–2004), South Korean poet
- Chang Sang (born 1939), South Korean politician, country's first female prime minister

== See also ==
- List of Korean family names
- List of Korean given names
