= Je =

Je or JE may refer to:

== Arts and entertainment ==
- JE (TV series), a Canadian television newsmagazine series on TVA
- Joy Electric, an analogue purist synthpop group

== Businesses and organizations ==
- Johnny's Entertainment, a Japanese talent agency
- Jonathan Edwards College, a residential college at Yale University
- Junior enterprise, a local non-profit organization offering consulting services (managed by students)
- Mango, a South African airline (2006-2021, IATA code JE)

== Language ==
- Je (Cyrillic), a character in several alphabets
- Je (Armenian letter)
- Jê languages, a language family of Brazil
- Yei language, or Je, a language of Papua New Guinea

== People ==
- Je (surname), a Korean family name
- Je Tsongkhapa (1357–1419), Tibetan religious leader

== Other uses ==
- , official symbol used for the Keiyō Line, operated by JR East.
- JE, an intermediate source text postulated by the documentary hypothesis for the Torah
- Jahnke and Emde aka "Tables of Functions with Formulas and Curves", a mathematics book on special functions
- Japanese encephalitis, an infectious disease
- Jersey, an island in the English Channel (ISO 3166-1 alpha-2 country code JE)
  - JE postcode area
  - .je, the Internet country code top-level domain for Jersey
- Jê peoples of Brazil
- Jurong East, a town in Singapore
- Jewish Encyclopedia
- Jōmon Era of prehistoric Japan
- Journal entry
