= Seung (Korean surname) =

Korean family name (승)

- Hangul: 승
- Hanja: 承; 昇
- RR: Seung
- MR: Sŭng
- IPA: [sɯŋ]

Seung, also spelled Sung, is an uncommon Korean surname.

== Overview ==
There are two hanja which may be used to write the surname Seung, each indicating different lineages. The 2000 South Korean census found 3,304 people with these surnames.

=== More common (承) ===
The more common Seung surname is written with a hanja meaning "inherit" (承; 이을 승; ieul seung). The 2000 South Korean census found 2,494 people with this family name, and 762 households. The surviving bon-gwan (origin of a clan lineage, not necessarily the actual residence of the clan members) at that time included:

1. Yeonil: 1,828 people and 568 households. They claim descent from Seung Gae (承愷), a general under Jeongjong, 10th monarch of Goryeo.
2. Gwangsan: 643 people and 188 households. This is a different name for the Yeonil Seung clan, claiming descent from the same ancestor.
3. Yangju: Six people and two households.
4. Other or undistinguished bon-gwan: 17 people and four households.

People with this surname include:

- T. K. Seung (born 1930), Korean-born American philosopher and literary critic
- Seung H-Sang (born Seung Hyo-sang, 1952), South Korean architect
- Sung Hyang-sim (born 1999), North Korean footballer
- Sebastian Seung, American physicist and neuroscientist of Korean descent

=== Less common (昇) ===
The less common Seung surname is written with a hanja meaning "rise" (昇; 오를 승; oreul seung). The 2000 South Korean census found 810 people with this family name, and 239 households. The surviving bon-gwan at that time included:

- Namwon: 613 people and 183 households
- Changpyeong: 134 people and 39 households
- Geumseong: 20 people and five households
- Miryang: 14 people and three households
- Naju: Six people and three households
- Other or undistinguished bon-gwan: 21 people and four households

== See also ==
- List of Korean family names
