= Eo (surname) =

- Hangul: 어
- Hanja: 魚, 漁
- RR: Eo
- MR: Ŏ

Eo (Korean: 어) is an uncommon Korean family name, also spelled Auh or Euh. The 2015 South Korean census found that there were only 18,929 people bearing the surname. It is written with two different hanja; the most common 魚, and the less common 漁. Most people with this surname belong to the Hamjong Eo clan.

Notable people with this surname include:

- Queen Seonui (선의왕후; 1705–1730), Queen of Joseon
- Eo Jae-yeon (어재연; 1823–1871), Joseon general
- Eo Jeong-won (어정원; born 1999), South Korean footballer
- Auh June-sun (어준선; 1937–2022), South Korean businessman and politician
- Ou Kyoung-jun (어정원; born 1987), South Korean footballer
- Ryu Soo-young (birth name Eo Nam-seon; 어남선; born 1979), South Korean actor
- Ŏ Yŏngdam (어영담; 1532–1594), Joseon military official
- Euh Yoon-dae (어윤대; born 1945), South Korean professor, financier, government advisor
