= Yong (name) =

Yong (Korean: 용) is a Korean family name and a Korean given name.

== As a family name ==
Most hanja with the reading Yong are pronounced that way in all dialects of Korean. However, the character used to write the family name 龍 (meaning "dragon") is also read as Ryong and spelled as such in hangul (룡). This is the standard reading in North Korea and among Koreans in China. In a study by the National Institute of the Korean Language based on a sample of year 2007 applications for South Korean passports, it was found that 97% of people with this surname chose to have it spelled it in Latin letters as Yong, while 3% chose to spell it Young, and none spelled it Ryong.

The 2000 South Korean Census found 14,067 people and 4,320 households with this family name. They identified with the following bongwan (the hometown of a clan lineage, not necessary the actual residence of the clan members):

- Hongcheon (in what is today Gangwon-do, South Korea): 12,733 and 3,930 households
- Gaeseong (in what is today South Pyongan Province, North Korea): 439 people and 130 households
- Suwon (in what is today Gyeonggi-do, South Korea): 264 people and 72 households
- Gwangju (in what is today South Korea): 206 people and 59 households
- Yongin (in what is today Gyeonggi-do, South Korea): 174 people and 54 households
- Paju (in what is today Gyeonggi-do, South Korea): 164 people and 54 households
- Other or unreported bon-gwan: 87 people and 21 households

People with this family name include:

- Yong Jae-hyun (born 1988), South Korean football player
- Yong Jun-hyung (born 1989), South Korean rapper
- Yong Hye-in (born 1990), South Korean civil society activist

== Given name ==
People with the given name Yong or Ryong include:

- Jang Yong (born 1945), South Korean footballer
- Ryoo Ryong (born 1957), South Korean chemistry professor
- Jim Yong Kim (born Kim Yong, 1959), South Korean-born American physician, 12th President of the World Bank
- Lee Yong (luger) (born 1978), South Korean luger
- Kang Yong (born 1979), South Korean footballer
- Min Ryoung (born 1982), South Korean short track speed skater
- Lee Yong (footballer born 1986), South Korean footballer
- Lee Yong (footballer born 1989), South Korean footballer

== See also ==
- List of Korean family names
- List of Korean given names
