= Maeng =

- Hangul: 맹
- Hanja: 孟
- RR: Maeng
- MR: Maeng

Maeng (Korean: 맹) is a Korean family name. The 2015 South Korean census found that there were 22,028 people bearing this family name. It has only one known bongwan, the Sinchang Maeng clan, whose ancestor was Mencius.

== People ==
Notable people with this surname include:

- Maeng Sang-hoon (born 1960), South Korean actor
- Maeng Se-chang (born 1991), South Korean actor and singer
- Maeng Seong-ung (born 1998), South Korean footballer
- Maeng Yu-na (1989–2018), South Korean singer
