= Kye (surname) =

- Hangul: 계
- Hanja: 桂; 季
- RR: Gye
- MR: Kye

Kye (Korean: 계) is a Korean family name. There were 6,641 people with this family name according to the 2015 South Korean census. The 1930 national census found that 97% of those with surname Kye were mostly found in the northern region (now North Korea), the majority were located in Sonchon County, North Pyongan Province.

Notable people with this surname:

- Bumzu (born Kye Beom-ju, 1991), South Korean singer, songwriter, record producer
- Kye Sun-hui (born 1979), North Korean judoka, Olympic gold medalist
- Kye Ung-sang (1893–1967), North Korean geneticist and expert on silkworms
- Kye Ung-thae (1925–2006), North Korean politician, former Vice Premier of North Korea
- Kye Yong-mook (1904–1961), South Korean writer
