= Kang Thae-mu =

North Korean military officer (1925–2007)

Personal details
- Born: 15 March 1925 Yeonghyeon-myeon, Goseong County, South Gyeongsang Province
- Died: 17 June 2007 (aged 82)
- Party: Workers' Party of Korea
- Education: Telecommunications Military School; Kim Il Sung Military University
- Occupation: Military officer, politician

Military service
- Allegiance: North Korea
- Branch/service: Korean People's Army
- Rank: Major general
- Battles/wars: Korean War

Kang Thae-mu (Korean: 강태무; 15 March 1925 – 17 June 2007) was a military officer and politician of North Korea. Although he was an officer of the Korean People's Army, he led the troops into the war just before the outbreak of the Korean War.

== Biography ==
Born in 1925 in Bongbal-ri, Yeonghyeon-myeon, Goseong County, South Gyeongsang Province, and moved to Jinju, South Gyeongsang Province. Graduated from Rikkyo University in Tokyo. Kang Tae-moo's older brother, Kang Tae-yeol, was a communist activist who later became a North Korean cadre and became a North Korean leader. After the end of the Second World War in 1945, Kang Tae-yeol introduced his younger brother to the independent activist Kim Chang-suk and received a letter of recommendation from Kim Gu to enter the second year of Korea Military Academy. Kang Tae-moo is a friend of Pyomu-won and they are all related to the left wing officer Choi Nam-geun, who passed through the 8th Regiment, and emerged on the investigation by Major Kim Chang-ryong's Sookgun investigation group.

Kim Chang-ryong suggested the arrest of Pyo Mu-won (표무원) and Kang Thae-mu. At the time, however, Chief of Staff Eung-Jun Lee had no fact that they had joined the Communist Party, and had been in charge of investigating and deploying eight trainees as they were heads of the unit in charge of the 38th parallel.

On 4 May 1949, Kang Tae-moo, commander of the 2nd Battalion of the 8th Regiment, stationed in Hongcheon, Kangwon Province, deceived that he would attack the Korean People's Army as a command of the regiment's operation against the battalion of the armed forces, and then proceeded to Inje-hyeon, Inje, Gangwon-do, North Korea. After the siege of the Korean People's Army, he surrendered to North Korea by voluntarily surrendering. However, Kim In-sik of the 8th Battalion and several troops of the 5th and 7th Company revolted and returned through the siege, 143 of the 300 battalion's troops revived, 150 surrendered, and surrendered.

On 5 May 1949, he was welcomed as a 'hero of the North of North Korea' together with a North Korean North Korean official, and re-educated at the Pyongyang Academy. In the Korean War, the 200th Battalion Commander of the 766th Regiment. Later, he advanced to the Masan area as the 104th security lead. In 1951, he was dispatched to the prison camps as an instructor to conduct the ideological education of the ROK prisoners. In 1952, he was the battalion commander of the 22nd Brigade of the People's Army of the Republic of Korea (President Ho-seong Song).

Subsequently, he participated in the war as vice-president and was promoted to major general at the age of 28 immediately after the armistice.

In 1977, he served as Vice-Chairman of the Yanggang Province Administrative Committee (People's Committee), and since 1996, has been a lecturer at the National Liberation War Victory Memorial Hall.

Received the Medal of Excellence and the Unification of the Fatherland. On his 75th and 80th birthdays, he received a birthday award from Kim Jong Il.
