= Hwan (name) =

Korean surname and given name

Hwan (Korean: 환) is a rare Korean family name and a Korean given name.

== Family name ==
As a family name, Hwan is written with only one hanja, the Sino-Korean name of the Sapindus mukorossi tree (桓; 굳셀 환 gutsel hwan). The 2000 South Korean census found 157 people with this family name. People with this family name include:

- Thomas Hwan, South Korean actor based in Denmark

== Given name ==
People with the given name Hwan include:

- Myeongjong of Joseon (1534–1567), personal name Yi Hwan
- Heonjong of Joseon (1827–1849), personal name Yi Hwan

== See also ==
- List of Korean family names
- List of Korean given names
