= Wi (surname) =

- Hangul: 위
- Hanja: 魏; 韋; 衛; 偉
- RR: Wi
- MR: Wi

Wi (Korean: 위) is an uncommon Korean family name. The 2015 South Korean census found that there were 32,191 people with this family name. It is written with four different hanja.

People with this surname include:

- Wi Bok-sun (born 1974), North Korean former international table tennis player
- Wi Ha-joon (born 1991), South Korean actor
- Wi Jae-wook (born 1973), South Korean cross-country skier
- Michelle Wie (born 1989), American professional golfer
- Wi Seo-yeong (born 2005), South Korean figure skater
- Wi Seong-gon (born 1968), South Korean politician
