= Taewon Seonu clan =

Korean clan from Shaanxi, China

- Country: Korea
- Current region: Taiyuan
- Founder: Seonu Jeong
- Connected members: Sunwoo Eun-sook; Sunwoo Jae-duk; Sunwoo Hwi; Sunwoo Jin

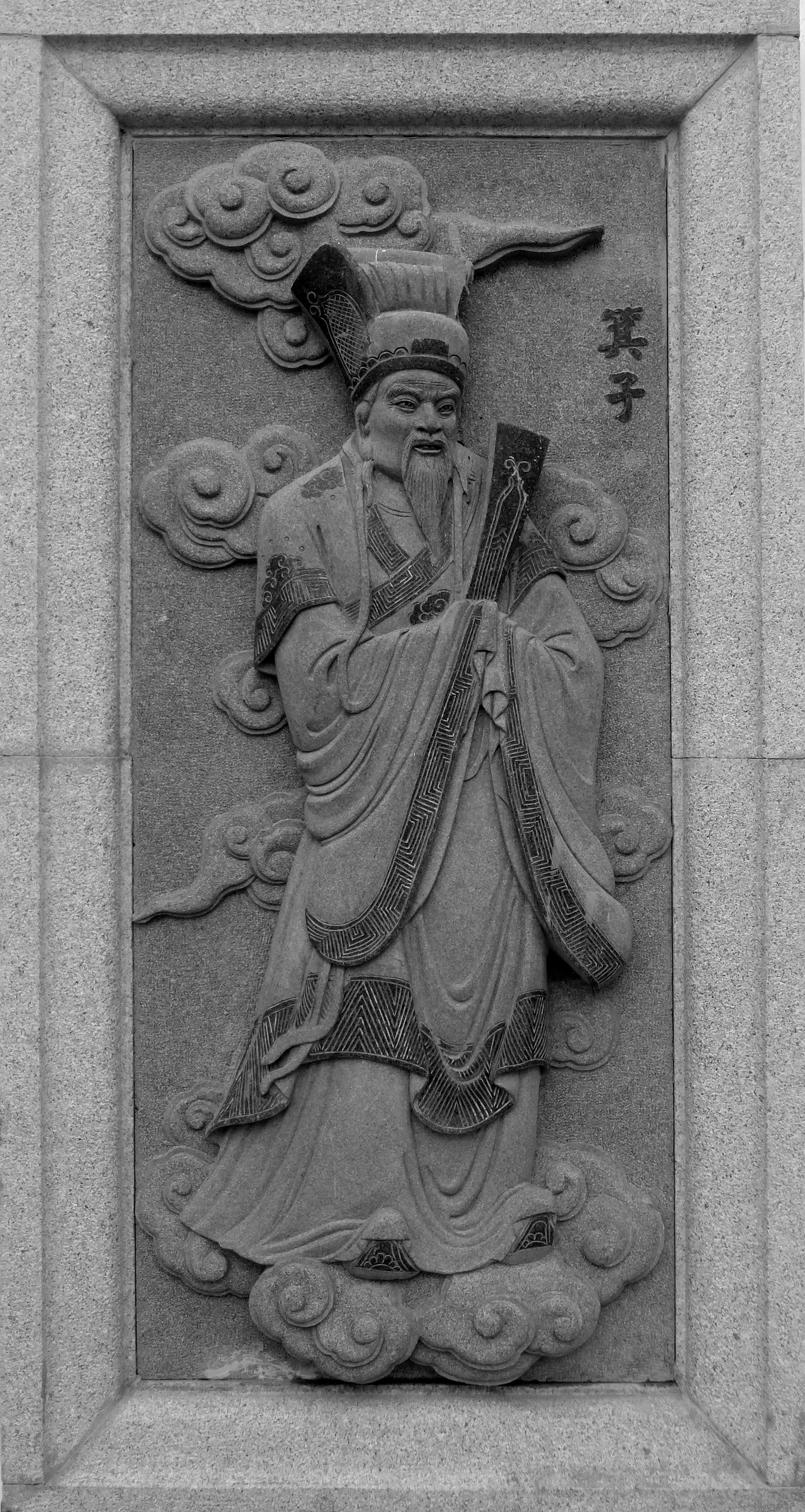
Gija

The Taewon Seonu clan (Korean: 태원 선우씨; Hanja: 太原 鮮于氏) is one of the Korean clans. Their Bon-gwan is in Taiyuan, Shanxi, China. Taiyuan, Shanxi was Gija's hometown. According to the census held in 2000, the number of the Taewon Seonu clan was 3560. Gija appointed Song, his oldest son, Song of Gojoseon, and Jung, his second son, Usan after he founded Gija Joseon. Then, Jung's descendant changed their surname to Seonu. He named "Seonu clan" (鮮于) using one of the words of Joseon (朝鮮) and Usan (于山国). Gi Yang was Gija's 48th descendant. The history of Seonu clan began after Gi Yang entered South Pyongan Province, and his son named Seonu Jeong was the founder of Seonu clan of Taewon.

== See also ==
- Korean clan names of foreign origin
