= Haepyeong Gil clan =

Korean clan

- Country: Korea
- Current region: Gumi, North Gyeongsang
- Founder: Gil Dang
- Connected members: Kil Chae; Gil Seon-ju; Kil Yong-woo; Gil Young-ah; Gill (musician)

The Haepyeong Gil clan (Korean: 해평 길씨; Hanja: 海平 吉氏) is a Korean clan. Their bon-gwan is in Gumi, North Gyeongsang Province. According to research conducted in 2015, there were 35,823 members of the Haepyeong Gil clan. Their founder was Gil Dang, one of the 'Eight Scholars' (Hanja: 八學士) that emigrated to Goryeo from Song China.

== See also ==
- Korean clan names of foreign origin
