= Sun Mu =

South Korean painter

- Hangul: 선무
- Hanja: 線無
- Revised Romanization: Seon Mu
- McCune–Reischauer: Sŏn Mu

Sun Mu is a Korean painter. He worked as a propaganda artist in North Korea before fleeing to South Korea in the 1990s.

== Personal history ==
Sun Mu was born in North Korea and trained by the North Korean Army as a propaganda artist. Later he studied art in college.

During a severe famine in the 1990s, he fled to South Korea where he works as a painter. Out of concern for the family he left behind in North Korea he uses the pseudonym "Sun Mu" instead of his real name and does not allow photos of his face.

== Art ==
Sun has acquired fame and notoriety for the Socialist Realist style of his paintings, which resemble North Korean propaganda imagery and have even been mistaken for such. One of his portraits of former North Korean leader Kim Il Sung was removed from a Pusan biennale because organizers wanted to avoid problems for exhibiting "pro-communist" art.

Sun himself and art critics have noted that his images are replete with political satire; depicting, for instance, the North Korean leaders in Western clothing. His signature work is the "Happy Children" series of paintings, which show North Korean children displaying the uniform forced smile that Sun says was taught to him at school in North Korea.

An exhibition of his works, scheduled to open at the Yuan Dian Gallery in Beijing at the end of July 2014, was cancelled at the request of the Chinese authorities.

He is the subject of the 2015 documentary I am Sun Mu directed by Adam Sjöberg.
