= Chirwon Je clan =

Korean clan from South Gyeongsang Province

- Country: Korea
- Current region: Haman
- Founder: Zhuge Yeong
- Connected members: Je Jong-geel
- Website: http://www.jekm.com.ne.kr/

Chirwon Je clan (Korean: 칠원 제씨; Hanja: 漆原 諸氏) is a Korean clan. Their Bon-gwan is in Haman County, South Gyeongsang Province. According to the research in 2015, the number of Chirwon Je clan was 20095. Their founder was Zhuge Yeong who was a politician in Han dynasty. Zhuge Liang was a 6th descendant of Zhuge Yeong. Zhuge Chung (Hanja: 諸葛忠), a great-grandchild of Zhuge Liang, came over to Silla during 13th king Michu of Silla’s reign.

== See also ==
- Korean clan names of foreign origin
