= KEUN (AM) =

- Eunice, Louisiana; United States
- Broadcast area: St. Landry Parish
- Frequency: 1490 kHz

Programming
- Format: News Talk Information
- Affiliations: IRN Radio Network, Louisiana Network News

Ownership
- Owner: Cajun Prairie Broadcasting; (Cajun Prairie Broadcasting, LLC)
- Sister stations: KEUN-FM

History
- First air date: October 12, 1952
- Call sign meaning: City of license: EUNice, LA

Technical information
- Licensing authority: FCC
- Facility ID: 67746
- Class: C
- Power: 1,000 watts unlimited
- Transmitter coordinates: 30°28′17″N 92°24′51″W

Links
- Public license information: Public file; LMS

KEUN (1490 AM) is a radio station licensed to Eunice, Louisiana, United States, broadcasting a news/talk/information format. The station is currently owned by Dane Wilson, through licensee Cajun Prairie Broadcasting, LLC.
