= KEUN-FM =

- Eunice, Louisiana; United States
- Broadcast area: Tri-Parish Area
- Frequency: 105.5 MHz
- Branding: 105-5 KEUN

Programming
- Format: Country music Swamp Pop and Cajun music on Saturdays 5am to 6pm

Ownership
- Owner: Dane Wilson; (Cajun Prairie Broadcasting, LLC)
- Sister stations: KEUN

History
- First air date: October 22, 1981
- Former call signs: KJJB
- Call sign meaning: Eunice

Technical information
- Licensing authority: FCC
- Facility ID: 67747
- Class: A
- ERP: 1000 watts
- HAAT: 148 meters (486 ft)
- Transmitter coordinates: 30°26′16″N 92°26′49″W

Links
- Public license information: Public file; LMS

KEUN-FM (105.5 FM) is an American radio station licensed to Eunice, Louisiana, United States, and serving St. Landry Parish and surrounding areas. Owned by Dane Wilson, through licensee Cajun Prairie Broadcasting, LLC., which is owned by Wilson, it broadcasts a contemporary country and Cajun music format every day except Saturdays, when it plays Cajun music from 5 a.m. to 6 p.m.

== History ==
The station went on the air October 22, 1981, after test transmissions began on October 20, bearing the callsign KJJB. Originally a 3,000 watt station, its power was reduced to 1000 watts ERP when the tower height was increased from 91 meters to 148 meters in 2001.
