= Bonghwa Geum clan =

Korean clan from North Gyeongsang Province

- Country: Korea
- Current region: Bonghwa County
- Founder: Geum Yong sik
- Connected members: Geum Min; Keum Na-na; Keum Sae-rok; Keum Dong-hyun

The Bonghwa Geum clan (Korean: 봉화 금씨; Hanja: 奉化 琴氏) is a Korean clan. Their bon-gwan is in Bonghwa County, North Gyeongsang Province. According to the research held in 2015, the number of Geum clan of Bonghwa was 23301. Geum clan began when Geum Eung (Hanja: 琴應) founded Gija Joseon with Gija after Gija conquered Korea. Their founder was Geum Yong sik who worked as High Merit Minister (Hanja: 壁上功臣) in Goryeo.

== See also ==
- Korean clan names of foreign origin
