= Song In =

Korean politician (fl. 12th century)

- Hangul: 송인
- Hanja: 宋仁
- RR: Song In
- MR: Song In

Song In (Korean: 송인; Hanja: 宋仁; ? – 1126) was a civil official in the mid-Goryeo era who became the intermediary founder of the Jincheon Song clan. His highest post was munha pyeongjangsa (문하 평장사). This was the highest government position in the period. Song In was responsible for administration, judicial affairs and economy in the district.

As he performed meritorious deeds during the King, he was conferred with Chanhwagongsin and Jincheonbaek. Baek was a position of politicians who were responsible for administration, judicial affairs and economy in the district. As the government created him Jincheonbaek, his family started regarding Jincheon as their origin. Hence, the family origin became Jincheon Song.

When he was in the position of Sangsanbaek, he tried to be just and fair in all the administrative affairs and emphasized the welfare of his people. He also focused on education for the youth and courtesy for people, contributing to a reputation for orderly and respectful behavior in the region. After that, he was remembered and respected for his efforts.

During the insurrection of Yi Cha-gyŏm in the 4th year of King Injong of Goryeo's reign in 1126, he was killed by a rebellious band led by Ch'ŏk Chun-gyŏng while escorting the king. After the rebels were put down, Song In was posthumously named 'meritous subject' and titled Lord Sangsanbaek (상산백).

Song was born in Durujinmaeul (village), Duchon-ri, Deoksan-myeon. He was promoted to Pyeongjangsa, which was the highest government position in the period.

== Tomb of Song In ==
North Chungcheong Province Monument No. 91 Location: Duchon-ri, Deoksan-myeon, Jincheon-gun

This is the tomb of Song In (? – 1126). It has a rectangular-shaped protective wall surrounding the tomb, typical of the Goryeo style. There are two tombstones erected in the late Joseon Dynasty period.

In the grave area, there are many tombs that belong to the clan. In front of his tomb stands the jaesil (chamber for memorial rites) with the tablet reading 'Sangsanjae'.

His grave is in Duchon-ri, Deoksan-myeon, which had been called Duruji, Sanjeong-myeon. The beautiful peak behind his grave is called Mountain Bibong which was named after Bongsae (bird) that is said to live in heaven and to fly down to sit on the summit. However, after the statue was inscribed with Song In, the founder of Jincheon Song, the peak was compared to a slowly dropping ume flower. Thus, Mountain Bibong was called Maesanbibong, in which 'Mae' was named after an ume flower instead of a bird.

As he was a meritorious subject and served as a Pyeongjangsa (higher government official), the government ordered his grave mound to be surrounded by stones and a monument. The grave is one of the oldest ones in Jincheon and is recorded in Seokchong (stone tomb) in Hwanyeoseungram.

Thousands of descendants of the Jincheon Song clan are living across the nation. Song Guk-cheom and Song Eon-gi who were devoted to fight against the Mongolian invasion into Goryeo are also the offspring of Jincheonbaek.

== See also ==
- Song (Korean name)
- Korean clans
