= Je Jong-geel =

South Korean politician

- 제종길

Mayor of Ansan
- In office July 1, 2014 – June 30, 2018
- Preceded by: Kim Chul-min
- Succeeded by: Yoon Hwa-seop

Member of the National Assembly
- In office May 30, 2004 – May 29, 2008
- Preceded by: Chun Jung-bae
- Succeeded by: Park Soon-ja
- Constituency: Ansan Danwon 2nd

Personal details
- Born: March 21, 1955 (age 71) Changwon, South Korea
- Party: Democratic
- Other political affiliations: Uri Party

Korean name
- Hangul: 제종길
- Hanja: 諸淙吉
- RR: Je Jonggil
- MR: Che Chonggil

Je Jong-geel (Korean: 제종길; born March 21, 1955) is a South Korean politician. He was a member of the 17th National Assembly and the mayor of Ansan from 2014 to 2018. He is a member of the Chirwon Je clan.
