= Ludovic Djé =

French footballer and manager (born 1977)

Personal information
- Date of birth: 22 July 1977 (age 48)
- Place of birth: Les Abymes, Guadeloupe
- Position(s): Defender, Midfielder, Forward

Senior career*
Years	Team	Apps	(Gls)
199x-1999	AFC Creil		
1999-2000	FC Atlas de Bruxelles		
2005-2006	Stockport County F.C.	10	(0)
2006	Hayes & Yeading United F.C.	1	(0)
2006-2007	East Thurrock United F.C.		
- * Club domestic league appearances and goals

Ludovic Djé (born 22 July 1977) is a French retired footballer of Ivorian descent, who now works as a manager at Seculand.

== Career ==
Dje started his senior career with AFC Creil. In 2005, he signed for Stockport County in the English Football League Division Three, where he made eleven appearances. After that, he played for English clubs Hayes & Yeading United and East Thurrock United before retiring.
