= Song Byeok =

North Korean defector (born 1969)

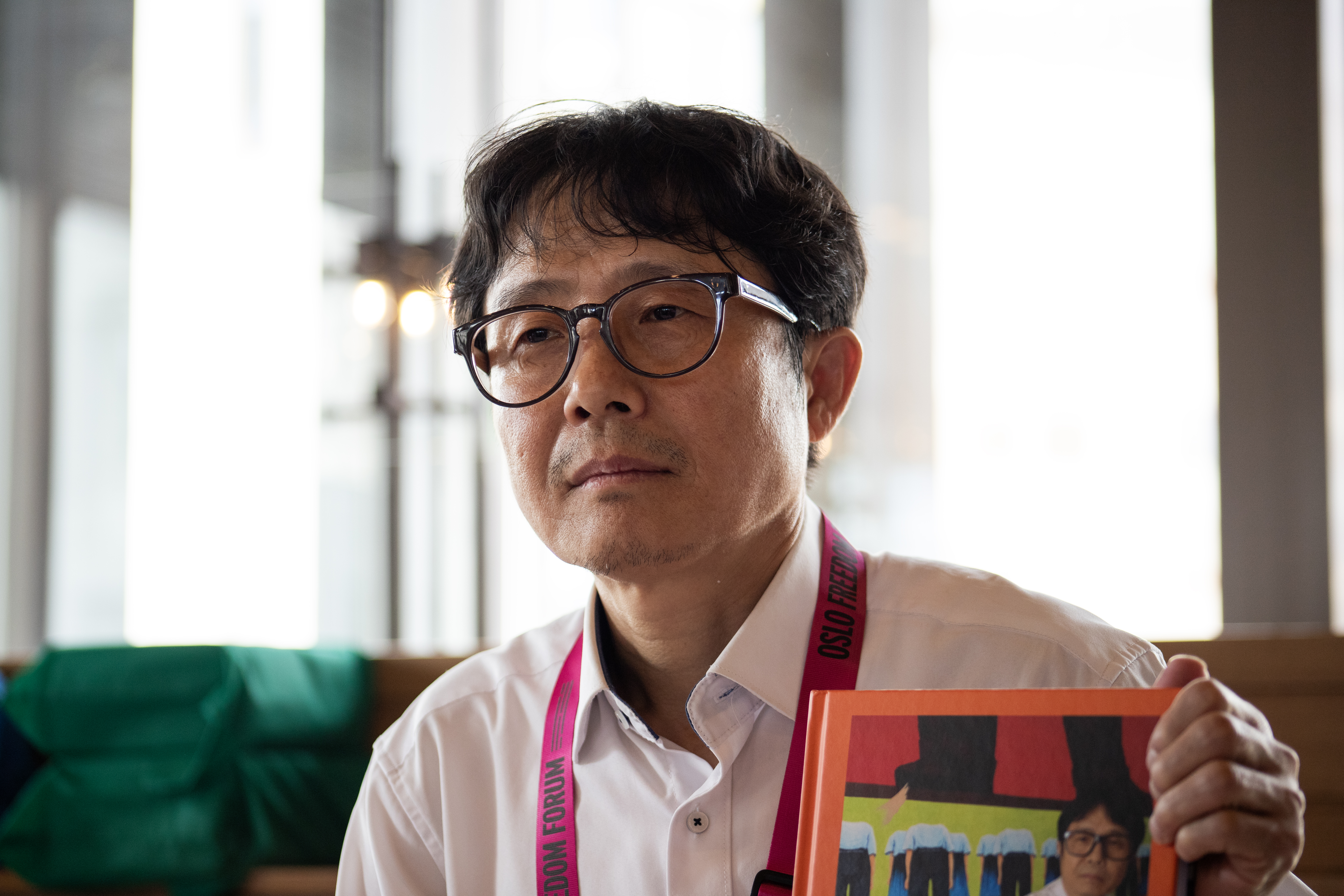
- Song in 2025
- Born: 1969; Hwanghae Province, North Korea
- Other names: Andy Warhol of North Korea
- Education: Hongik University
- Alma mater: Kongju National University
- Occupations: Painter; Artist; Human rights activist
- Years active: 1990 – present

Song Byeok (Korean: 송벽; born 1969) is a South Korean painter, activist, and North Korean defector. Before defecting, he was a propaganda painter. Often referred to as the "Andy Warhol of North Korea", he is known for his satirical pop art that critiques the North Korean regime and its cult of personality. After a harrowing defection in 2002 following the death of family members during the North Korean famine, Song settled in South Korea, where he transformed his propaganda techniques into a medium for political dissent and human rights advocacy.

== Early life and career in North Korea ==
Song Byeok was born in 1969 in Hwanghae Province, North Korea. Growing up under the Juche ideology, he displayed an early talent for sketching and art. While working as a laborer, his skills were discovered by a local official, leading to his recruitment as an official state propaganda artist at age 24.

For seven years, Song produced posters praising the Kim regime, painting utopian scenes of happy workers and soldiers alongside slogans such as "Let us become a bullet for General Kim Jong-il!". During this period, he was a "true believer" in the regime's indoctrination.

== Famine and defection ==
Song's perspective shifted during the "Arduous March" famine of the 1990s, which claimed the lives of his mother and younger sister. In 2000, facing starvation, Song and his father attempted to cross the Tumen River into China to find food. His father was swept away by the current and drowned; when Song approached North Korean border guards for help, he was instead arrested and tortured.

He spent six months in a labor reform camp, where he suffered severe abuse, including the loss of a finger. Released while near death, he eventually escaped to China in 2001 and arrived in South Korea in January 2002.

== Artistic style and major works ==
In South Korea, Song received a formal education in fine arts, earning bachelor's and master's degrees from Hongik University and Kongju National University. He began subverting the bold, graphic style of propaganda into satirical pop art. His most famous work, Take Off Your Clothes depicting former leader Kim Jong-il's head on Marilyn Monroe's body in her iconic white dress pose from The Seven Year Itch. Later he made another painting called Show of Dictator which features Kim Jong-un on the body of Elvis Presley.

He painted another one called Hope a painting of a man spreading wings, representing the desire for freedom for the North Korean people. Later he made another called Around the Tumen River a traditional Tang Dynasty-style landscape that, upon closer inspection, reveals the harsh realities of North Korean life, such as soldiers scrounging for food.

In 2025, he published his autobiography, Escaping North Korea: The Journey of a Propaganda Painter to the Free World.

== Activism ==
Song continues to engage in international advocacy, participating in events like the Bergen International Literary Festival (LitFestBergen) to discuss North-South Korean relations and the power of art in protest.

== Recognition and recent projects ==
Song has received international acclaim for his role in the "Art in Protest" movement. In 2018, he was awarded the Global Artist Award (also cited as the Global Artist of Distinction) for his contributions to human rights advocacy. His work has been featured at Amnesty International in London, the Minnesota Street Project in San Francisco, and the Center for Korean Studies at the University of Hawai'i.
