= Je Jong-hyun =

South Korean footballer

Personal information
- Full name: Je Jong-hyun
- Date of birth: 6 December 1991 (age 34)
- Place of birth: South Korea
- Height: 1.91 m (6 ft 3 in)
- Position: Goalkeeper

Youth career
- 2010–2012: Soongsil University

Senior career*
Years	Team	Apps	(Gls)
2013–2018	Gwangju FC	42	(0)
2016–2017	→ Sangju Sangmu (army)	6	(0)
2019	Asan Mugunghwa	3	(0)
2020–2025	Cheonan City	63	(0)
2023	FC Mokpo (Loan)	27	(0)
- * Club domestic league appearances and goals as of 7 January 2026

Je Jong-hyun (Korean: 제종현; born 6 December 1991) is a South Korean footballer who plays as goalkeeper.

== Career ==
He was selected by Gwangju FC in the 2013 K League draft.
