= Sunwoo Jin =

Korean independence activist (1922–2009)

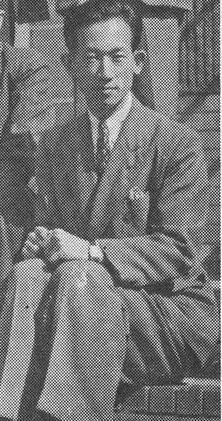
- Sunwoo Jin visiting Pyongyang for inter-Korean Negotiations.

Vice-President of the United States Army Military Government in Korea, Chief of Staff
- In office February 1, 1946 – August 15, 1948
- Minister: Ahn Jae-hong, Minister of Civil Affairs, U.S. Military Government

Personal details
- Born: January 18, 1922 Jeongju-gun, Heianhoku Province, Korea, Empire of Japan
- Died: May 17, 2009 (aged 87) Seoul Veterans Hospital, South Korea
- Party: Korean Independence Party
- Other political affiliations: New Democratic Republican Party

Military service
- Branch/service: Korean Liberation Army
- Rank: Lieutenant

Korean name
- Hangul: 선우진
- Hanja: 鮮于鎭
- RR: Seonu Jin
- MR: Sŏnu Chin

Sunwoo Jin (Korean: 선우진; January 18, 1922 – May 17, 2009) was a Korean independence activist and politician. He served as an officer of the Korean Liberation Army.

He was born in the Jeongju-gun, North Pyongan Province and comes from the Taewon Seonu clan. Jin played a major role in the Korean independence movement as the personal secretary to famous Korean activist Kim Ku. He served as his personal secretary from the period around the liberation of Korea until June 26, 1949, when he was assassinated.

== Early life and education ==
Jin was born in Japanese occupied Korea, in the Jeongju-gun, North Pyeongan Province. Being born ethnically Korean, he and his family was discriminated against along with many others during this period.

At the age of 18, Jin attended the Changchun University in Manchuria, earning a Bachelor's degree from the Department of Law. He then sought off to the Central Military Academy where he graduated in order to prepare for his career as a member of the Korean Liberation Army. After his work as a Korean activist and service in the Korean Liberation Army, he completed another Bachelor's degree in Public Administration at the Korea National Defense University.

In his early 20s, he left and helped form the Korean Independence Party as well as volunteering in the Korean Liberation Army alongside Kim Ku. He had to leave most of his family behind and he did not see them again until after Korean independence.

== Exile in China ==
Having left his family behind, Jin travelled with many other young aspiring Korean activists in order to fight for Korean independence. Many independence movements in Korea used China as a protector state in order to avoid Japanese persecution. The journey through China was rough, as China was an economically downtrodden nation due to many years of political conflicts and warfare with its neighbors. With the lack of vehicles to aid their travel, Jin and his associates had to walk over 6,000 miles to Shanghai, China.

=== Work in the Korean Liberation Army and Korean Independence Movement ===
Joining Kim Ku's work in China to help liberate Korea from Japanese rule, Jin enlisted in the Korean Liberation Army in August 1944. He entered the Korean Liberation Army cadre training group attached to the 10th branch school cadre training group at the Central Military Academy where he would complete his military education and training. He was then assigned to the General Headquarters of TI&E (Troop Information and Education) and was commissioned as a lieutenant in the Liberation Army. At the general headquarters, he worked on propaganda campaigns, and worked to broadcast news for those listening to networks affiliated with the Korean independence movement.

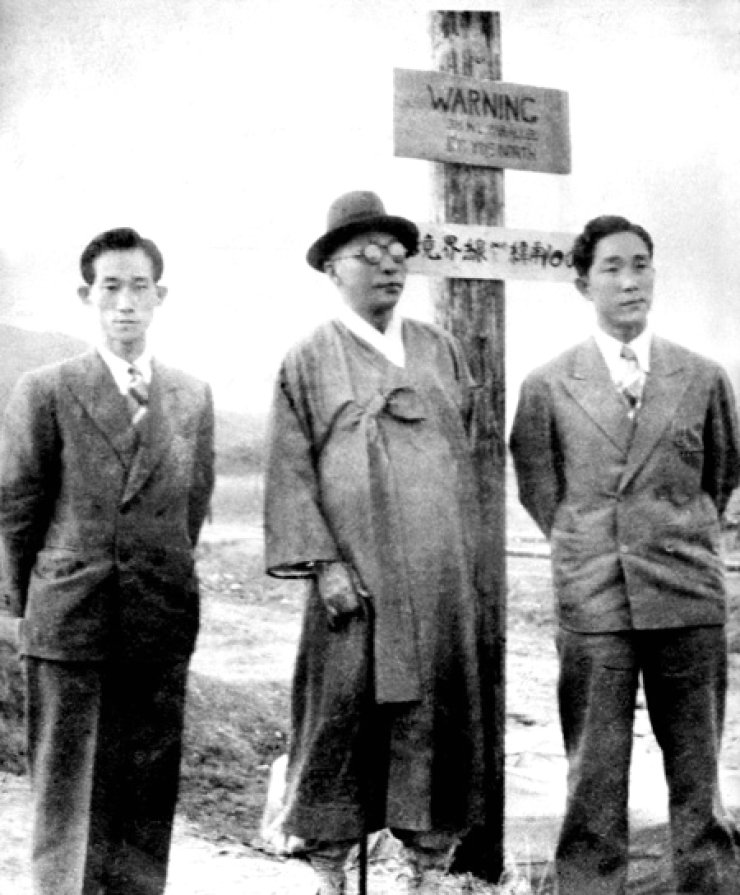
Kim Ku, in the center, Sunwoo Jin, to the left, and Kim Shin, to the right, prepare to cross into the 38th parallel on April 19, 1948. They prepare to attend a joint South-North conference in Pyongyang. / Courtesy of Dolbegae.

== After the liberation of Korea ==
After seeing the liberation of Korea with the fall of the Japanese Empire and their surrender to Allied powers, Jin attempted to return to South Korea. Because of the ongoing Chinese Civil War, there were issues that impeded the return of Jin and Kim Ku back to South Korea. The Nationalist Chinese government was supposed to help facilitate the return of Jin and Kim, but could not due to political conflicts. Eventually, the United States was able to help Kim and Jin return to South Korea in time for the joint South-North conference in Pyongyang in 1948. He then worked as a Korean politician as the Vice-President of the United States Army Military Government in Korea, Chief of Staff to Kim being the President of this committee prior to the establishing of the First Republic of Korea. Jin was awarded the National Founding Medal of the Republic of Korea in 1977 and the Order of National Founding of the Republic of Korea Patriotic Medal in 1990.

=== Under the Rhee presidency ===
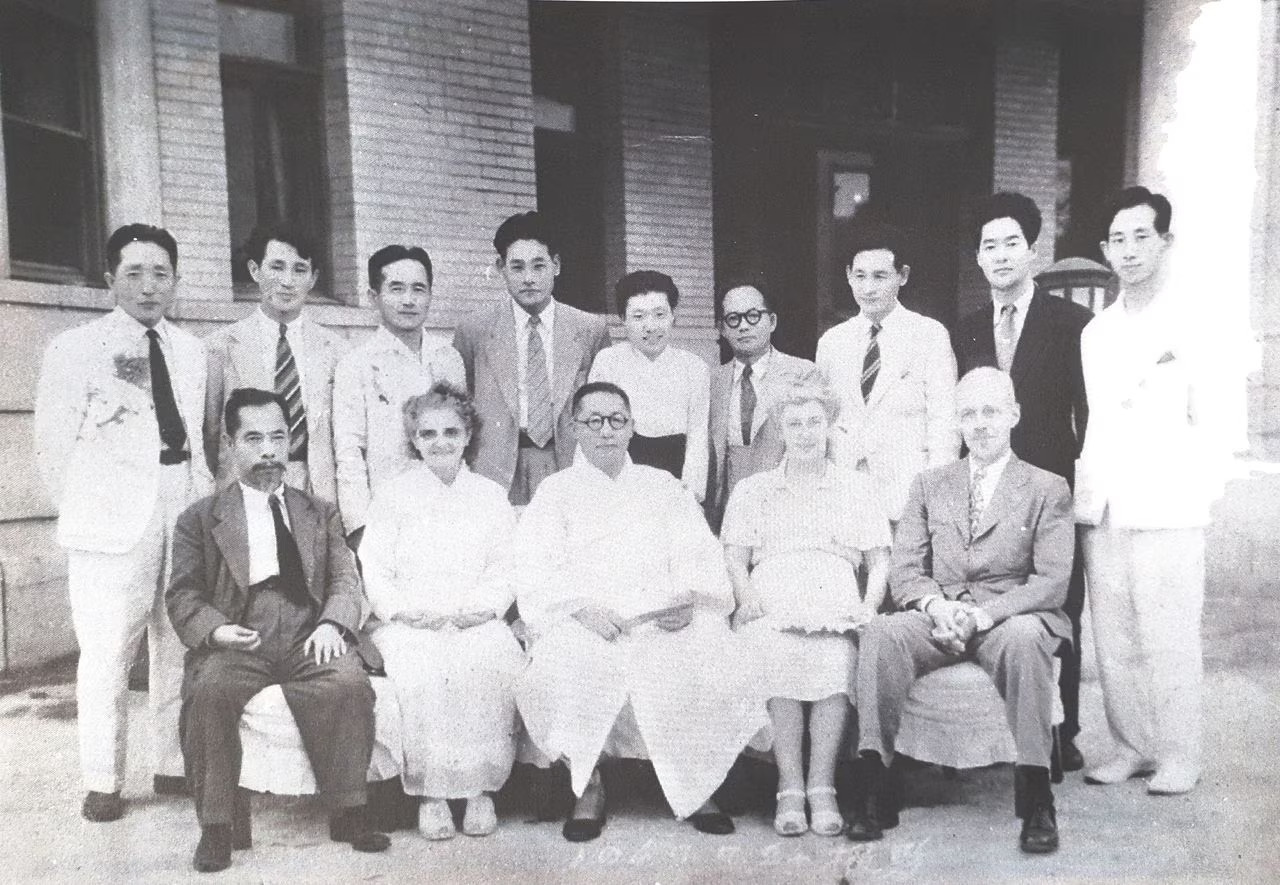
Sunwoo Jin in a group photo, 1946

During Syngman Rhee's presidency in the First Republic of Korea, Rhee's government was disliked by many Korean citizens as it was similar to the North's. The First Republic was ruled in an authoritarian dictatorship-like way with limited democracy in the country. After Rhee took office as the president, many Korean activists and independence fighters were targeted in fear of a counter revolution against his rule. Because of the unpopular regime, many riots and protests broke out in Korea for reforms and government change. As a result of this, Kim Ku, and many other activists were persecuted and hunted down by the military and police for suspicion of instigating the insurrections. After Kim's assassination, because Jin was such a trusted associate of Kim, whenever there were protests against Rhee, the police believed Jin was directly involved, and he had to hide in the attic in his home to prevent his arrest as an instigator against Rhee.

== Later life and death ==
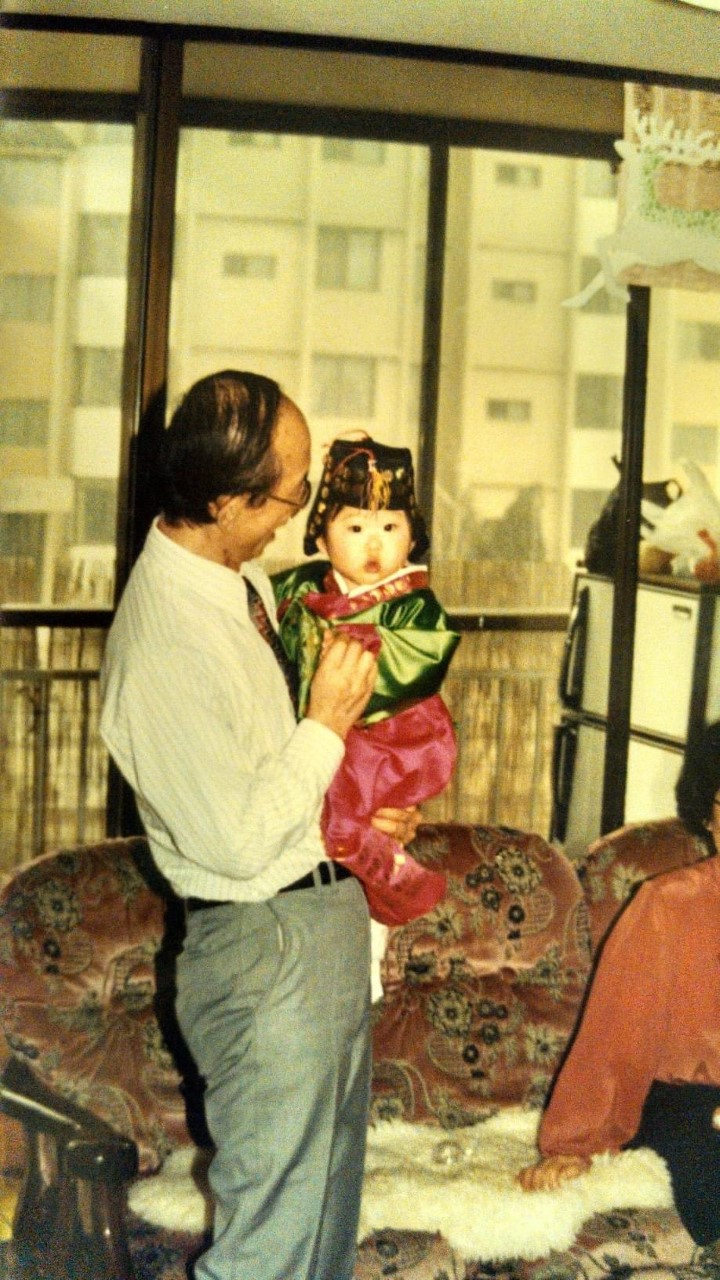
Jin with his granddaughter.

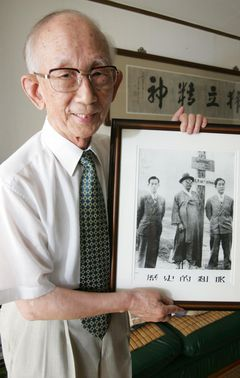
Seon Woo-Jin holding a picture of the 1948 North–South Korea conference.

After leaving politics behind, Jin continued to work as Kim's secretary. He helped manage and organize Kim's work and life until Kim's death in 1949. After Ku's death, Jin worked to maintain the Kim Ku memorial in Seoul. He had many business ties with the museum and Kim himself, and became its executive director. He lived with his family until his passing on May 17, 2009, at the age of 87. He was buried at the National Cemetery in Daejon on May 20, 2009.

== Personal life ==
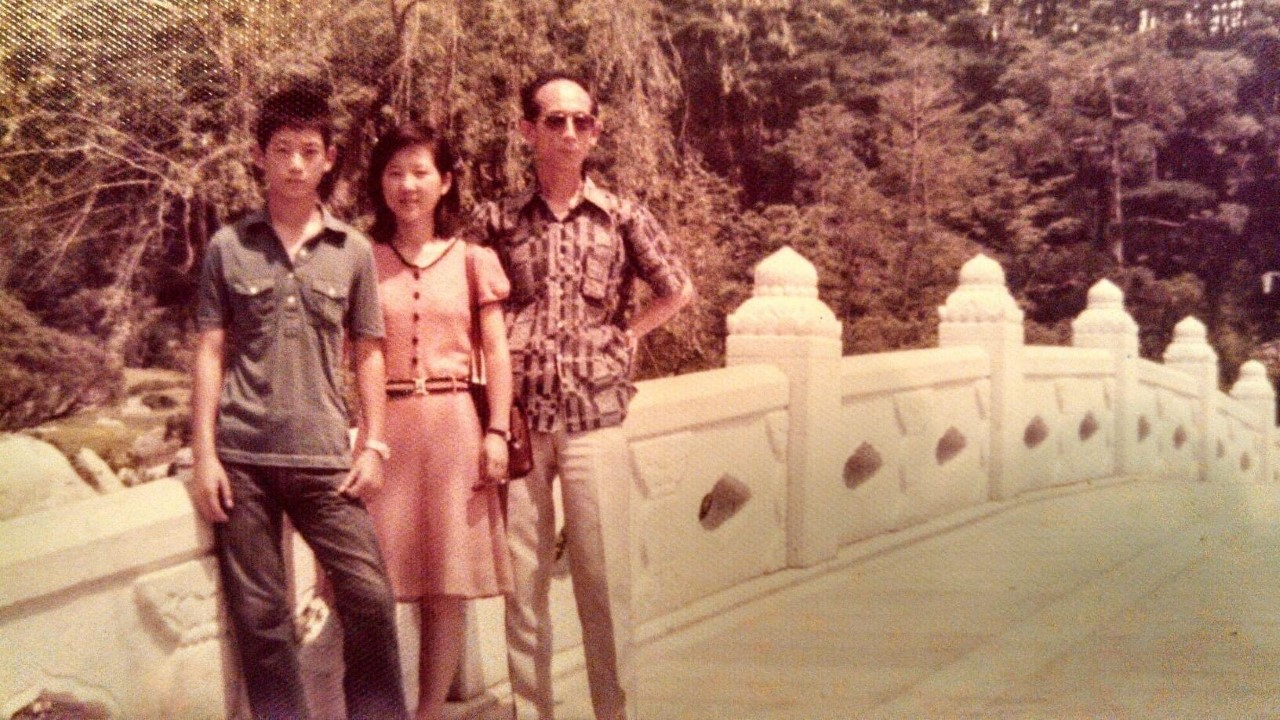
Jin with his family.

Jin was the father of six children (3 boys and 3 girls including twin girls), and a husband to Kwon Jeong-rye, his work placed his family in precarious situations. His twin daughters were born on June 22, 1950, in Seoul, 3 days before the beginning of the Korean War. As the two newborns were put to sleep, a bomb was dropped near their house, and shrapnel had flown and left a small scar on his daughter's face. Because of the ongoing conflict and threat of invading forces from the North, Jin's family was forced to flee to Busan. He and his family had to walk to Busan, due to the chaos and inability to access vehicles and the threat of enemy bombings.

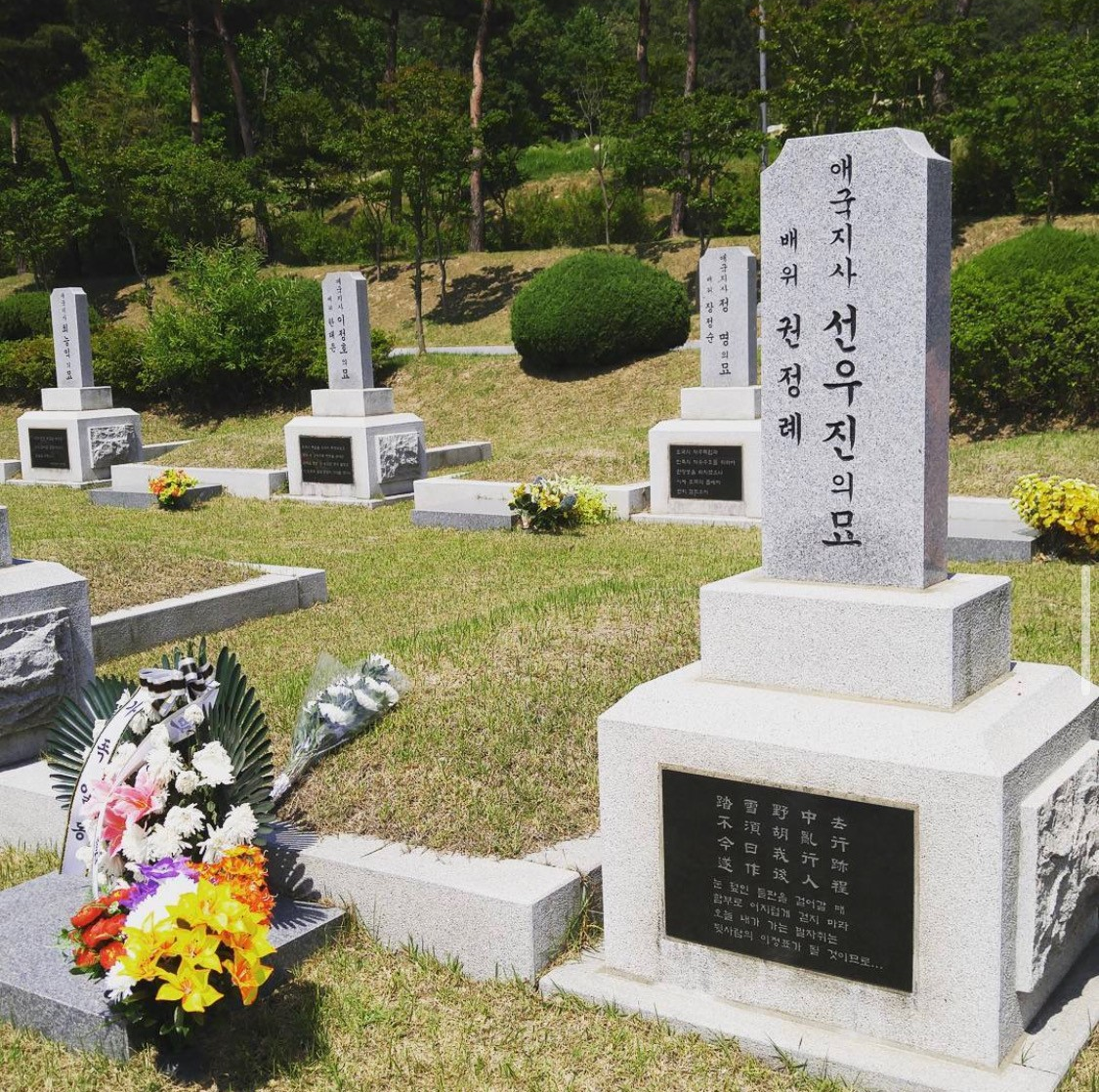
Jin's grave at the National Cemetery in Daejon
