= Geun =

Geun (Korean: 근), also spelled Gun, Keun, or Kun, is a rare Korean family name, a Korean given name, and a historical Korean unit of measurement for weight.

== Family name ==
As a family name, Geun is written with one hanja, meaning "axe" (斤; 도끼 근), also the name of the unit of weight sometimes called "catty" in English. It has one clan: Cheongju, Chungcheongbuk-do, in what is today South Korea. The 2000 South Korean census enumerated that there were 242 people with this family name.

== Given name ==
People with the given name Geun include:

- Kwŏn Kŭn (1352–1409), early Joseon Dynasty Neo-Confucian scholar
- Ri Gun, North Korean diplomat

== Unit of measure ==
The actual weight of a geun (Korean: 근; Hanja: 斤) varies depending on context with ranges from 200 grams to 600 grams and a typical weight of 375 grams. These and further details can be found at Wikipedia's article concerning Korean units of measurement.

== See also ==
- List of Korean family names
- List of Korean given names
