= Cheon =

- Hangul: 천
- Hanja: 千; 天
- RR: Cheon
- MR: Ch'ŏn

Cheon, also spelled Chun or Chon, is an uncommon Korean surname. It is written with either of two hanja:

- Ilcheon Cheon (千) meaning "thousand". This is the more common character, used as a surname by 103,811 people in 32,229 households in South Korea, according to the 2000 census.
- Haneul Cheon (天), meaning "heaven". The 2000 census found 8,416 people in 2,668 households who used this character to write their surname.

In a study by the National Institute of Korean Language based on 2007 application data for South Korean passports, it was found that 50% of people with this family name spelled it in Latin letters as Cheon in their passports, while 42% spelled it Chun, and 3.5% spelled it Chon. Rarer alternative spellings (the remaining 4.5%) included Choun and the Yale romanization Chen.

People with this surname include:

== Entertainment ==
- Chun Bo-geun (born 2002), South Korean actor
- Greg Chun (born 1971), American voice actor and musician
- Chun Ho-jin (born 1960), South Korean actor
- Chun Jung-myung (born 1980), South Korean actor
- Chun Myung-hoon (born 1978), South Korean singer, rapper, actor
- Chun Soo-yeon (stage name Song Ji-hyo, born 1981), South Korean actress
- Chun Woo-hee (born 1987), South Korean actress

== Sportspeople ==
- Cheon Eun-bi (born 1992), South Korean field hockey player
- Cheon Eun-suk (born 1969), South Korean basketball player
- Cheon Hui-ju (born 1975), South Korean speed skater
- Cheon In-sik (born 1968), South Korean sprint canoeist
- Cheon Ju-hyeon (born 1977), South Korean speed skater
- Cheon Min-ho (born 1987), South Korean sport shooter
- Cheon Seong-hoon (born 2000), South Korean professional footballer
- Cheon Seong-tae (born 1943), South Korean rower
- Cheon Seul-ki (born 1989), South Korean field hockey player

== Writers ==
- Chon Kye-young (born 1970), South Korean manhwa author
- Cheon Myeong-kwan (born 1964), South Korean novelist
- Cheon Sang-byeong (1930–1993), South Korean poet
- Cheon Un-yeong (born 1971), South Korean writer of short stories
- Cheon Yang-hee (born 1942), South Korean poet

== Other ==
- Cheon Ho-sun (born 1962), South Korean politician
- Cheon Jinwoo (born 1962), South Korean professor of nanomedicine
- Cheon Jun-ho (born 1971), South Korean politician
- Chun Jung-bae (born 1954), South Korean politician
- Cheon Jung Hee (born 1969), South Korean mathematician
- Kyung-ja Chun (1924–2015), South Korean painter
- Mina Cheon (born 1973), South Korean-born American artist
- Taksu Cheon (born 1958), Japanese physicist
- Chun Yung-woo (born 1952), South Korean diplomat and politician

== See also ==
- List of Korean family names
- Yeongyang Cheon clan
