= Sun-woo =

- Hangul: 선우
- RR: Seonu
- MR: Sŏnu

Sun-woo (Korean: 선우), also spelled Seon-u, Sŏn-u, or Seon-woo, is a Korean given name.

People with this given name include:

== Entertainers ==
- Jang Sun-woo (born 1952), South Korean film director
- Kim Seon-wu (born 1970), South Korean poet
- Baro (born Cha Sun-woo, 1992), South Korean singer

== Sportspeople ==
- Sun-woo Kim (born 1977), South Korean male baseball pitcher (Korea Baseball Organization)
- Kim Sun-woo (footballer born 1983), South Korean male football forward (K-League Classic)
- Infiltration (gamer) (born Lee Seon-woo, 1985), South Korean professional electronic games player
- Kim Sun-woo (footballer, born 1993), South Korean male football midfielder (K-League Classic)
- Kim Sun-woo (pentathlete) (born 1996), South Korean female modern pentathlete
- Kwon Sun-oo (born 1999), South Korean female snowboarder

== Other ==
- Do Sunwoo, South Korean writer
- Sun Woo Lee, South Korean businessman, former Samsung COO

== Fictional characters ==
- Kim Sun-woo, in 2005 South Korean film A Bittersweet Life
- Kim Sun-woo, in 2011 South Korean television series Poseidon
- Kim Sun-woo, in 2012 South Korean television series Man from the Equator
- Park Sun-woo, in 2013 South Korean television series Nine: Nine Time Travels
- Jung Sun-woo, in 2013 South Korean television series Monstar
- Ha Sun-woo, in 2014 South Korean television series Cheo Yong
- Sung Sun-woo, in 2015 South Korean television series Reply 1988
- Park Sun-woo, in 2016 South Korean television series Signal
- Lee Sun-woo, in 2020 South Korean television series Nobody Knows
- Ji Sun-woo, in 2020 South Korean television series The World of the Married
- Sunwoo Han, a.k.a. Jett, in 2020 video game Valorant

== See also ==
- List of Korean given names
