= Pyo Mu-won =

Korean military officer, defector to North Korea (1925–2006)

Personal details
- Born: 10 February 1925 Daegu, North Gyeongsang Province
- Died: 15 April 2006 (aged 81)
- Citizenship: North Korean
- Party: Workers' Party of Korea
- Education: Korea Military School
- Occupation: Military officer, politician

Military service
- Allegiance: North Korea
- Branch/service: Korean People's Army
- Rank: Major general
- Battles/wars: Korean War

Pyo Moo-won (Korean: 표무원; February 10, 1925 – April 15, 2006) was a military officer and politician of the Democratic People's Republic of Korea. He was an officer of Armed Forces of the Republic of Korea who defected to the North Korean side and joined the Korean People's Army.

== Biography ==
Born in 1925 in Daegu, North Gyeongsang Province. He graduated from Daesung Middle School in Tokyo. He was born in Japan as a special supporter; he also served as a military soldier.

After the end of World War II in 1945, he was active in the Daegu district of the left armed forces reserve, and enlisted as a soldier with the recommendation of the vice-chairman Ha Jae-pal, who was from Daegu who was participating in the creation of the 6th Regiment. Ha Jae-pal, who had a strong left-wing propensity, organized a private organization called the “National Armed Forces Reserve” in Daegu shortly after the end of the Second World War, and assembled the left-wing youth. When the U.S. military government drove into an illegal organization, he entered the Military English School (Korean: 군사영어학교), the predecessor of the Yuksa, and completed the 6th Regiment Formation after becoming an army marshal. Pyo Mu-won enlisted in the 6th Regiment, joined the left wing Kim Jong-suk as Lieutenant Sergeant, and then entered the 2nd Korea Military Academy with the recommendation of the left-wing Choi Nam-geun (Lt. Neung-geun).

Pyo Mu-won was appointed as the 1st Battalion Commander of the 8th Regiment in Chuncheon, and on May 4, 1949, on the afternoon of marching and night training, he deceived the soldiers and gathered 455 battalions. Subsequently, he fled to the north of the 38th parallel and surrendered himself to the Korean People's Army. There were 4 officers and 213 soldiers. Under the leadership of Lieutenant Choi Dong-seop and Han Jeong-hee, some troops escaped and 239 returned. Major Kang Thae-mu, the second battalion commander of Pyo Mu-won's hometown friend, came to North Korea in the same way.

On May 5, 1949, Kang Thae-mu was awarded Hero of the Democratic People's Republic of Korea and retrained at Pyongyang Academy. In the Korean War, he landed on the Samcheok officers as the 424th Battalion Commander of the 766th Regiment. In 1951, he was dispatched to the prison camps as an instructor to conduct the ideological education of the ROK prisoners. In 1952, he was the battalion commander of the 22nd Brigade of the Korean People's Army (President Ho-seong Song). [6]

In 1954, he served as the head of the Political School of the North Korean Residents, in 1961, Vice-Chairman of the Military People's Committee, and in 1977, Vice-Chairman of the People's Committee of the North Pyongan Province. Re-enlisted in 1996, he served as a lecturer for the Victory of the Fatherland Liberation War as a rank of Lieutenant General and received the Order of Kim Il-sung and the 'National Unification Award' for his contribution to the system.
