= Byeon Yung-jeon =

South Korean politician (1940–2025)

- 변웅전

Member of the National Assembly of South Korea
- In office 30 May 2008 – 29 May 2012
- In office 30 May 1996 – 29 May 2004

Personal details
- Born: 15 October 1940 Seosan, Korea, Empire of Japan
- Died: 23 November 2025 (aged 85) Seoul, South Korea
- Political party: ULD; LFP
- Education: Chung-Ang University (BA, MA)
- Occupation: Journalist

Byeon Yung-jeon (Korean: 변웅전; 15 October 1940 – 23 November 2025) was a South Korean politician. A member of the United Liberal Democrats and the Liberty Forward Party, he served in the National Assembly from 1996 to 2004 and again from 2008 to 2012.

Byeon died in Seoul on 23 November 2025, at the age of 85.
