= Eun (Korean given name) =

- Hangul: 은
- RR: Eun
- MR: Ŭn

Eun (Korean: 은), also spelled Un, or En, Ehn, Enn, Unn, is a Korean given name. Notable people with the name include:

- Yi Un (1897–1970), Joseon Dynasty prince
- Ko Un (born 1933), South Korean poet
- Lee Eun (born 1961), South Korean film director
- Eun Yang (born 1973), American journalist

== See also ==
- List of Korean given names
