= Byeon Yeong-ro =

South Korean poet (1898–1961)

Pyun Yong-ro
- Born: 1898; Hanseong, Joseon
- Died: 1961; Seoul, South Korea
- Occupations: Poet; English literature scholar

Korean name
- Hangul: 변영로
- Hanja: 卞榮魯
- RR: Byeon Yeongro
- MR: Pyŏn Yŏngno

Art name
- Hangul: 수주
- Hanja: 樹州
- RR: Suju
- MR: Suju

Byeon Yeong-ro (Korean: 변영로; 1898–1961), also known by the art name Suju (수주), was a Korean poet and English literature scholar. His original name was Byeon Yeong-bok (변영복; 卞榮福), but he changed his name in 1958. He is considered a pioneer of modern Korean poetry and is well known for the poem, "Nongae" (논개), which was included in South Korean government-issued textbooks from 1953 to 2003.

== Biography ==
Byeon was born in Seoul in 1898. He began studying English in 1915 when he was 17 years old and graduated from a three-year English language course in only six months. In 1923, he became a lecturer at Ewha Womans University, and in 1931, he went to the United States to study at San José State University. In 1946, he became an English professor at Sungkyunkwan University. In 1955, he was elected the first chairman of the Korean PEN association.

Byeon died of throat cancer in 1961.

== Works ==
- Cosmos – An English poem written in 1918, published in the magazine Youth (청춘)
- Non-Gae – A poem published in 1922 about the spirit of Nongae
- Sa-Byeuk song
- MyungJeong 40nyun – Essay published in 1953 about a drunkard living through life.

== Episode ==
Byun Young-ro often drank at a bar called Eunsung. The bar owner was Lee Myung-sook, the mother of Korean actor Choi Bul-am. One day, Choi Bul-am entered university. Byun Young-ro gave Choi Bul-am a glass of rice wine. Before drinking the rice wine, Choi removed the yeast mass by hand, and was slapped by Byun Young-ro. The reason was because he threw away food thoughtlessly.
