= Eun =

- Hangul: 은
- Hanja: 殷; 恩
- RR: Eun
- MR: Ŭn
- IPA: [ɯn]

Eun, also spelled Un, or En, Ehn, Enn, Unn, is an uncommon Korean surname.

== Overview ==
=== Eun (殷) ===
The 2000 South Korean Census found 15,657 people with this Korean surname. They traced their origins to three different bon-gwan: Yonan County, South Hwanghae and Kangeum, Kumchon County, North Hwanghae in what is today North Korea, and Haengju (행주동), Goyang, Gyeonggi-do in what is today South Korea.

=== Eun (恩) ===
It is said that the queen of King Uija of Baekje is Eungo in the Nihon Shoki. Gobu-eun, who is based in Gobu-gun, Jeolla-do, was born in 1784 by Eun Kwang-hoon, born in 1754 He was paid in time-departed radish. Eun Kwang-hoon's residence is Yeongyu, Pyongan-do, Pyeongwon-gun. In 1930, a national census showed that one family was living in Ssangyong-myeon, Gangseo-gun, South Pyongan. In the 2015 National Statistical Office Census, there were 13 people with this surname.

People with the surname Eun (殷 or 恩) include:

- Eun Hee-kyung (born 1959), South Korean writer
- Eun Hwi (born 2004), South Korean singer, member of boy band TNX
- Eun Ji-won (born 1978), South Korean rapper, leader of boy band Sechs Kies
- Eun Soo-mi (born 1963), South Korean activist and politician
- Eun Won-jae (born 1994), South Korean actor

== See also ==
- List of Korean surnames
