= Kyung =

Kyung (Korean: 경), also spelled Kyoung, Gyeong, Kyeong, Keyoung, or Kyong, is an uncommon Korean family name, as well as a Korean given name.

== As a family name ==
The 2000 South Korean Census found 15,784 people with the family name Kyung. It may be written with either of two different hanja. Those with the name meaning "scenery" (景) may belong to one of two different clans: Haeju, South Hwanghae, in what is today North Korea, and Taein (泰仁). There is only one clan for the other Kyung surname, meaning "celebration" (慶): Cheongju, Chungcheongbuk-do, in what is today South Korea. In a study by the National Institute of the Korean Language based on 2007 application data for South Korean passports, it was found that 69.2% of people with this surname spelled it in Latin letters as Kyung in their passports, while another 19.2% spelled it as Kyoung. The Revised Romanisation spelling Gyeong came in third place at 7.6%. Rarer alternative spellings (the remaining 4.0%) included Kyeong.

People with the surname Kyung include:

- Kyŏng Tae-sŭng (1154–1183), Goryeo Dynasty general
- Kyong Won-ha (born 1928), North Korean nuclear scientist
- Kyung Soo-jin (born 1987), South Korean actress
- Kyung Sung-hyun (born 1990), South Korean alpine skier

== Given name ==
People with the given name Kyung include:

- Kyung Lah (born 1971), Korean-American journalist
- Sol Kyong (born 1990), North Korean judo practitioner
- Park Kyung (born 1992), South Korean rapper and record producer
- Hong Kyung (born 1996), South Korean actor

== See also ==
- List of Korean given names
