= Pyo Hyun-myung =

- Hangul: 표현명
- RR: Pyo Hyeonmyeong
- MR: P'yo Hyŏnmyŏng

Pyo Hyun-myung (Korean: 표현명) is the President of KT Telecom's Personal Customer Group, and a member of their board of directors. Pyo also sits on the board of directors of GSM World, a worldwide organization of GSM mobile communications providers.

He has BS (1981), MS (1983) and Ph.D. (1988) degrees in Electronic Engineering from Korea University. His first employer was the Electronics and Telecommunications Research Institute.
