= Gil Young-tae =

South Korean footballer (born 1991)

Gil Young-Tae
Personal information
- Full name: Gil Young-Tae
- Date of birth: June 15, 1991 (age 35)
- Place of birth: South Korea
- Height: 1.87 m (6 ft 2 in)
- Positions: Centre back; defensive midfielder

Team information
- Current team: Gangwon FC
- Number: 19

Senior career*
Years	Team	Apps	(Gls)
2014–2015	Pohang Steelers FC	17	(1)
2016	Gangwon FC	23	(3)
- * Club domestic league appearances and goals

Gil Young-Tae (Korean: 길영태) is a Gangwon FC footballer from South Korea

Listed on the K-League winter transfers list, it said that he went out from Pohang Steelers FC to Gangwon FC.
