= Horween =

Horween may refer to:

- Ralph Horween, American football player and coach, brother of Arnold Horween
- Arnold Horween, American football player and coach, brother of Ralph Horween
- Horween Leather Company, an American tannery located in Chicago
