= MagSafe (wireless charger) =

Magnetic connection system for Apple products

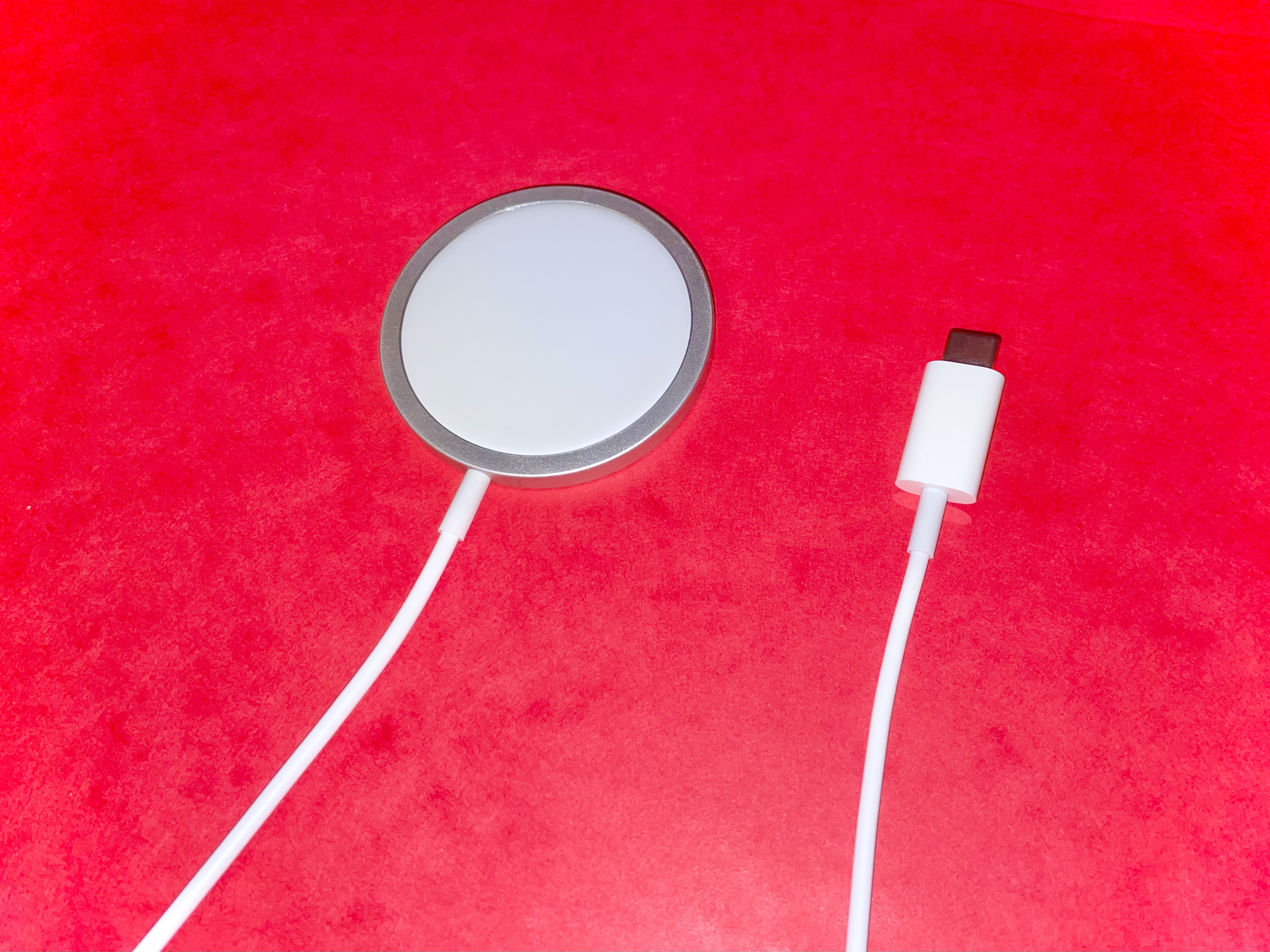
- MagSafe Charger
- Type: Smartphone wireless charging connector

Production history
- Designer: Apple Inc.
- Manufacturer: Apple Inc.
- Produced: October 2020 (5 years ago)
- Hot pluggable: Yes
- External: Yes

MagSafe is a proprietary, magnetically attached wireless power transfer and accessory-attachment standard developed by Apple Inc. for its iPhone and AirPods product lines. It was announced on October 13, 2020, in conjunction with the iPhone 12 and 12 Pro series.

The first version of MagSafe provides up to 15 W of power and is compatible with the open Qi standard for up to 7.5 W of power. The second version, announced in 2024 in conjunction with the iPhone 16 and 16 Pro, provides up to 25 W of power and is compatible with the Qi2 standard for up to 15 W of power. A revised MagSafe Charger released in 2025 supports Qi2 charging up to 25 W. The connector also enables connecting non-charger accessories such as card holders and cases with communication through an integrated NFC loop. The charger uses a circle of rare-earth magnets.

Apple released two chargers using the MagSafe standard in 2020: the MagSafe Charger, which is a single charging pad for iPhone, and the MagSafe Duo Charger, which is a charging mat with both MagSafe and an Apple Watch charger. Apple has also licensed the MagSafe standard to third parties to develop chargers and cases. In 2021, Apple released the MagSafe Battery Pack and added MagSafe charging to AirPods and AirPods Pro. In 2025, Apple released a MagSafe Battery exclusively for the iPhone Air.

== History ==
The MagSafe name was first used by Apple for the conductive power connectors of its MacBook lineup, beginning with the 2006 MacBook Pro. It began to be phased out upon the release of the 2015 MacBook, which used USB Power Delivery and the USB-C connector for charging. MagSafe was discontinued across MacBooks in 2019 but reintroduced with 14 in (360 mm) and 16 in (410 mm) MacBook Pro models released in October 2021.

In 2017, Apple announced AirPower, a wireless charging mat capable of charging an iPhone, AirPods and Apple Watch (which uses a proprietary wireless charging system) simultaneously and the devices could be placed anywhere on the mat. However, it was canceled in early 2019 due to overheating issues caused by the many overlapping coils.

Apple announced MagSafe along with the iPhone 12 series on October 13, 2020, during the “Hi, Speed” Apple Special Event as a universal ecosystem of wireless charging and accessories. Apple's chargers based on MagSafe are their first to use the Qi standard, following the development of AirPower. The MagSafe receptacle on iPhones, internally called MagSafe Attach, uses magnets to align automatically and attach to a Qi charger, ensuring reliable charging.

On October 18, 2021, Apple released the 3rd generation AirPods and an updated SKU of AirPods Pro with a bundled MagSafe charging case.

In 2023, the Wireless Power Consortium announced the Qi2 standard that is based on MagSafe.

== Chargers and accessories ==
=== MagSafe Charger ===
The MagSafe Charger is a single charging pad that contains recyclable rare-earth magnets surrounding a Qi wireless charging coil with a 1 m cable terminating in a USB‑C plug. The first version of the MagSafe Charger, released in 2020, delivers up to 15 W of power to iPhones 12, 12 Pro, and newer, with the exception of iPhone 12 Mini and 13 Mini, which support 12 W. The Wall Street Journal found the MagSafe Charger charged at half the speed of a 20 W wired charger. Being a Qi charger, the MagSafe Charger can charge all Qi-certified devices, including older iPhone models and AirPods, though testing by MacRumors found that MagSafe charged iPhones older than the 12 series at around half the speed of third-party 7.5 W Qi chargers. Devices without MagSafe or Qi2's Magnetic Power Profile (MPP) need to be manually aligned as they do not have the built-in array of magnets that interlock with MagSafe. Apple recommends a 20 W power adapter. Users have reported MagSafe Chargers leaving circular imprints on leather cases.

On September 9, 2024, Apple discontinued the original MagSafe Charger and replaced it with a second-generation model that provides up to 25 W charging with the iPhone 16/16 Pro series and newer, and 20 W with the iPhone Air. It is compatible with the Qi2 standard for up to 15 W of power. Apple recommends a 30 W power adapter. In September 2025, Apple released an updated version with support for 25 W Qi2 charging.

=== MagSafe Duo Charger ===
The MagSafe Duo Charger is a foldable charging mat with a MagSafe charger on one side and an Apple Watch charger on the other. The Apple Watch charger disc can be laid flat for face-up charging or can be vertical for nightstand use. The MagSafe Duo charger can be folded when not in use. The charger came with a Lightning–to–USB-C cable, and Apple recommends their newer 30 W USB-C power adapter (released in 2018), and notes their older 29 W adapter is incompatible and can only charge one device at a time.

Durability testing performed by Apple Insider found that the hinge could fail with frequent folding, noting it "started to break down at 180 folds and ultimately failed at 212." The larger camera array on the iPhone 13 Pro and later models elevates the top end from the charger with a case so it not longer sits flush, though charging is unaffected. The MagSafe Duo does not support fast charging on Apple Watches released since 2021 (Series 7 and later, Ultra). The MagSafe Duo was discontinued in September 2023.

=== MagSafe Battery Pack ===
In July 2021, Apple released the MagSafe Battery Pack (A2384). It contains a 11.13 W⋅h, 1,460 mA⋅h battery that on its own can charge an iPhone at up to 7.5 W. While the pack is being charged via Lightning it can charge an iPhone at up to 15 W. The pack itself can be charged either directly through its Lightning port or wirelessly from an iPhone that is being charged via Lightning (ie Reverse wireless charging). Height 95.8 mm, width 64.13 mm, thickness 11.28 mm and weight of 113.8 grams. The MagSafe Battery Pack was discontinued in September 2023 after the iPhone 15 series was released, which charges via USB‑C for wired charging rather than Lightning.

=== MagSafe Battery for iPhone Air ===
On September 9, 2025, Apple released the MagSafe Battery which is only compatible with the iPhone Air (A3466) and provides up to an extra 65% charge. It supports 12 W wireless charging, or up to 20 W when connected to a power adapter. It can also be reversed charged by an iPhone connected to power. It can charge smaller accessories using its USB-C port at up to 4.5 W. It will function with other iPhones and devices with MagSafe and/or Qi, but the camera bumps on other iPhones prevent it from sitting flat, it will only mount flush when sideways. 3149 mAh, 12.26 Wh, input 5-9V 3A, output 5V 1.5A PD 3.0, certified CE and CCC. Height 122.24 mm, width 70.78 mm, thickness 7.72 mm and weight of 126.5 grams.

=== Cases, wallets and sleeves ===
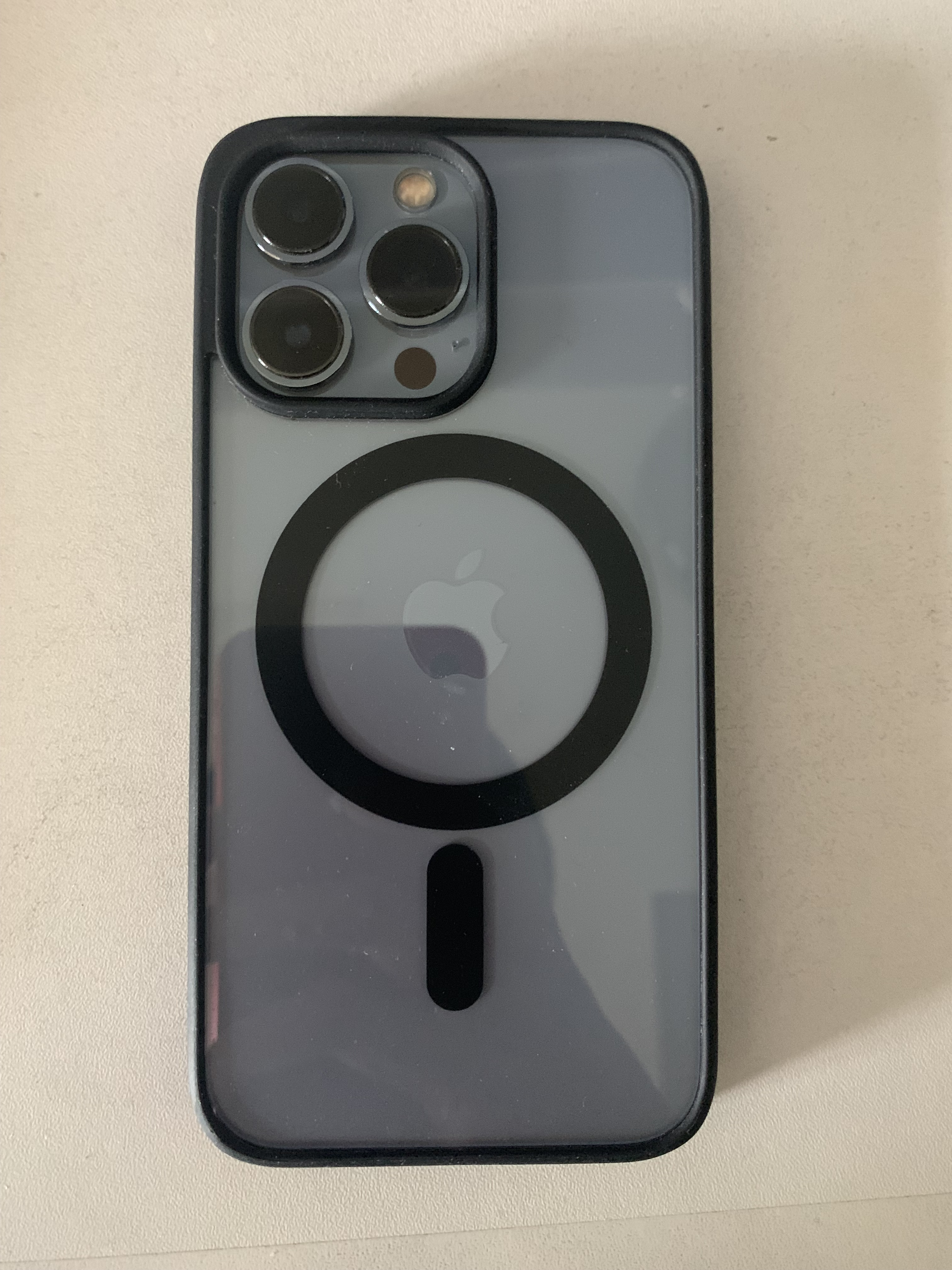
A clear iPhone case showing the MagSafe magnet layout

Apple released a line of MagSafe cases and other accessories, such as leather sleeves and wallets that can attach magnetically to iPhones and cases with MagSafe. Apple states MagSafe charging works through their cases. Apple states that their leather wallets are shielded to protect credit cards from the rare-earth magnets used in these accessories, although warns that credit cards should not be placed between an iPhone and a MagSafe charger. In 2021, Apple released an updated MagSafe wallet with an NFC chip that supports Find My location tracking when the wallet is disconnected from an iPhone, but is not supported by Apple's clear cases for iPhone 12 models. In 2023, with the iPhone 15 family, Apple replaced the leather MagSafe wallet with a FineWoven version. The FineWoven cases were replaced with "TechWoven" cases in 2025 with the iPhone 17 family.

=== Third-party chargers and accessories ===
Apple refers to officially licensed third-party MagSafe products as "Made for MagSafe". Apple worked with Belkin to design chargers using MagSafe. At launch, Belkin was the only accessory maker to which Apple had licensed the MagSafe charging standard; while other third-party accessory makers advertise magnetic charging products as "MagSafe compatible," they use older Qi standards that deliver a maximum charging speed of 7.5 W, compared to first-generation MagSafe's 15 W, and lack integrated NFC. In 2022, accessory maker Mophie worked with Apple to release a 3-in-1 Made for MagSafe travel charger; Nomad also released a charging base. OtterBox manufactures officially licensed cases and a 2-in-1 charger.

== Devices supporting MagSafe ==
The following devices support MagSafe:

- iPhones released in October 2020 and later (iPhone 12/12 Pro and newer) except the iPhone SE (3rd generation) and iPhone 16e
  - The iPhone 16/16 Pro and newer support 25 W charging with the second-generation MagSafe Charger, with the exception of the iPhone Air which supports 20 W charging, and the iPhone 17e which supports 15 W charging. The iPhone 12/12 Pro and newer (except the 3rd generation iPhone SE and iPhone 16e) support Qi2 with iOS 17.4.
- MagSafe Charging Case for AirPods (3rd generation)
  - The wireless charging case for AirPods (4th generation) does not have magnets to automatically align with MagSafe chargers due to its smaller size.
- MagSafe Charging Case for AirPods Pro (first-generation SKUs after October 2021, and second generation and newer)

=== MagSafe compatible ===
MagSafe chargers are listed as compatible with all iPhones with Qi charging, which includes the iPhone 8 through iPhone 11 family; however, the magnetic function cannot be used and only charging up to 7.5 W is supported. MagSafe cases or stickers for those phones are not MFi-certified and may interfere with the compass and GPS.
