= Elston Avenue =

- Daniel Elston Memorial Avenue
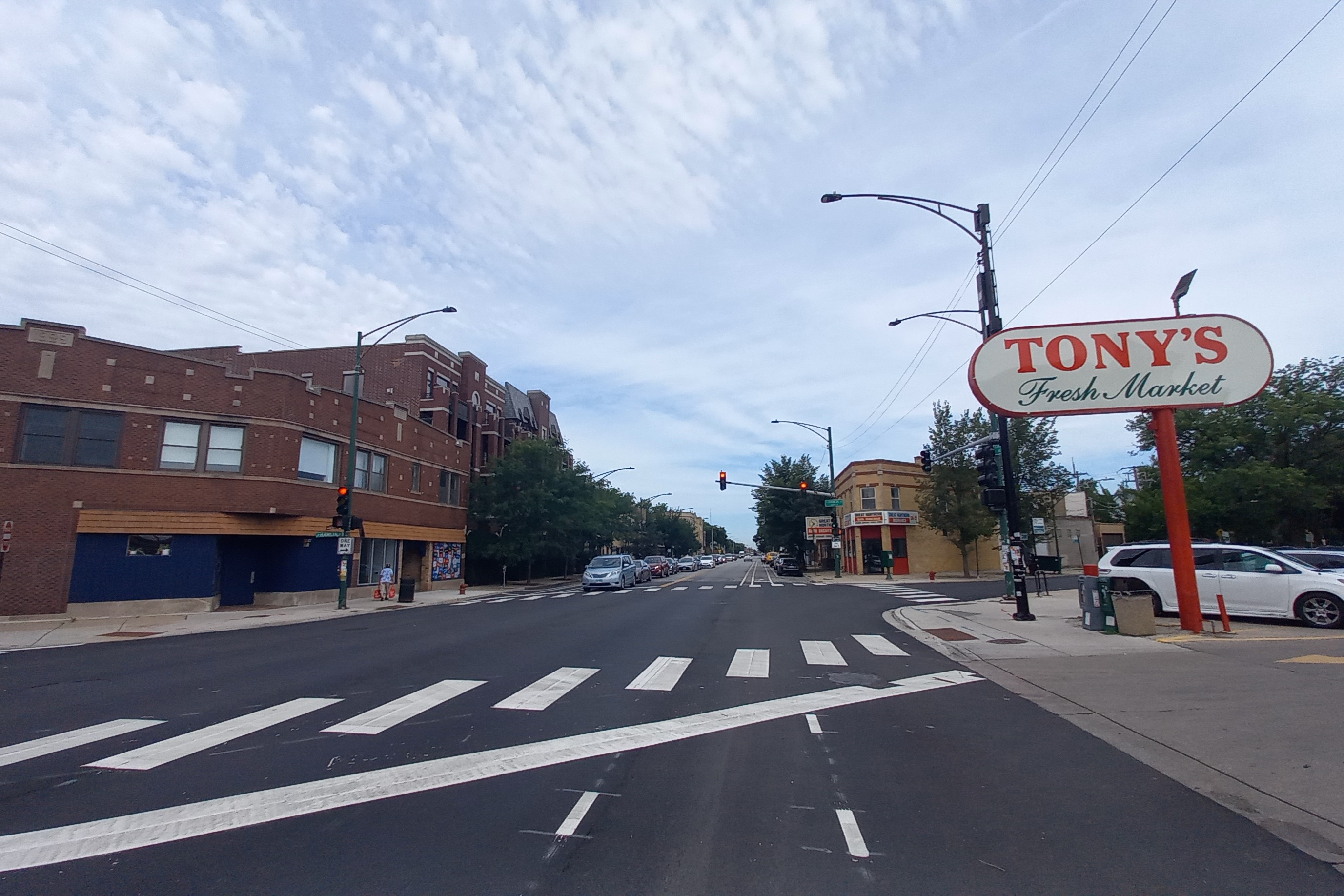
- Elston Avenue at Hamlin Avenue
- Length: 9.51 mi (15.30 km)
- Location: Chicago
- South end: Milwaukee Avenue in West Town, Chicago
- North end: Milwaukee Avenue/Melvina Avenue in Norwood Park, Chicago

Elston Avenue is a street in the city of Chicago, serving as an alternate route along the east side of the Kennedy Expressway (Interstates 90 and 94). It begins at Milwaukee Avenue, just north of Chicago Avenue. It travels northwest for almost 10 miles (16 km) until ending at Milwaukee Avenue again, just south of Devon Avenue. The road never strays too far from either the Kennedy Expressway or Milwaukee Avenue.

== Route description ==
After beginning at Milwaukee Avenue, Elston Avenue travels northwest for its entire route. On its routing, it intersects streets such as Division Street, Illinois Route 64 (North Avenue), Armitage Avenue, Fullerton Avenue, and Damen Avenue. Elston Avenue then crosses Diversey Avenue and Western Avenue at the same point. After this intersection, the road continues northwest, intersecting Belmont Avenue, Kedzie Avenue, Addison Street, Illinois Route 19 (Irving Park Road), and Pulaski Road. Elston Avenue then crosses over Interstate 94 (Edens Expressway). then has intersections with Illinois Route 50 (Cicero Avenue) and Foster Avenue. Elston Avenue finally ends again at Milwaukee Avenue.

== History ==
In the 1830s, the road was a toll road operated by Amos J. Snell, who set up tolls at the intersections with Division Street, Lawrence Avenue, and Milwaukee Avenue. Snell charged 2.5c per mile and could collect as much as $790 in a single day. A group of local farmers who were tired of paying the tolls dressed up as Indians and destroyed the toll gates.

In 1920, what is now Horween Leather Company moved to its current location in a five-story block-long factory at 2015 North Elston Avenue (at Ashland Avenue), on the Chicago River. It obtained the site, which remains the company's current location, by purchasing it from Herman Loescher and Sons tannery.

=== Public transit ===
Surface transit services (streetcars and buses) previously ran along Elston Avenue, with the latest being 41 Elston/Clybourn. This bus route, coupled with nine other routes, was discontinued in 1997 due to budget constraints.

== Major intersections ==
The entire route is in Chicago, Cook County.

mi	km	Destinations	Notes
0.0	0.0	North Milwaukee Avenue	Southern terminus
1.0	1.6	IL 64 (West North Avenue)	
5.3	8.5	IL 19 (West Irving Park Road)	
7.3	11.7	I-94 east (Edens Expressway)	Eastbound I 94 entrance only
7.3	11.7	IL 50 (North Cicero Avenue)	
9.5	15.3	North Milwaukee Avenue/North Melvina Avenue	Northern terminus
1.000 mi = 1.609 km; 1.000 km = 0.621 mi: Incomplete access
