= Arda Bowser =

American football player (1899–1996)

Profile
- Positions: Fullback; Halfback

Personal information
- Born: January 9, 1899; Danville, Pennsylvania, United States
- Died: September 7, 1996 (aged 97); Winter Park, Florida, United States
- Listed height: 6 ft 2 in (1.88 m)
- Listed weight: 210 lb (95 kg)

Career information
- College: Bucknell; Bethany

Career history
- 1922: Canton Bulldogs
- 1923: Cleveland Indians

Awards and highlights
- NFL champion (1922); Frank G. Menke All-America team (1920); Grantland Rice All-American team (1921)
- Stats at Pro Football Reference

Other information
- Military career
- Allegiance: United States
- Branch: U.S. Navy
- Service years: 1917–1919
- Conflicts: World War I

Arda "Ard" Crawford Bowser (January 9, 1899 – September 7, 1996) was a professional football player who spent two years of the National Football League with the Canton Bulldogs and the Cleveland Indians. Bowser won an NFL championship with the Bulldogs in 1922. In 1923, he played for the Indians. He was the first NFL player to use the kicking tee. Arda was considered the last surviving member of the 1922 Canton Bulldogs team, when he died in 1996.

== Early life ==
Arda Crawford Bowser was born on January 9, 1899, in Danville, Pennsylvania. He was the son of Rev. Addison Bartholomew Bowser (1858-1936) and Ella Zelima Stebbins (1869-1954).

== College career ==
After serving in the Navy during World War I, Bowser entered Bethany College, however he transferred to Bucknell University in 1920 where he also played college football. At Bucknell, he received All-East and All-American honors. He was captain of the 1921 Bucknell football team and is considered one of the great kickers in the school's history.

He received Honorable Mention on Walter Camp's All-American team. Ross Kauffman, a noted football authority, to call Bowser "the greatest line 'cracker' in the country." That same year, Bowser made Kauffman's All-Pennsylvania College team and Kauffman's All-Eastern team as first-team fullback. He also made first-team All-America on Frank G. Menke's team and the New York Telegram's team. Arda led all eastern colleges in scoring in 1920 with a 102 points, most of which came from 13 TD's he scored.

In 1921, Bowser was Bucknell's captain and again led the East in scoring with 112 points. He was named first-team All-America on Grantland Rice's All-American team.

== Professional career ==
In 1922, Bowser discovered that he used up his all of college football eligibility. He however stayed on to finish his degree requirements and assist head coach Pete Reynolds in 1922. At this time Bowser also played professional football for two teams at three positions: fullback, linebacker and kicker. On a visit to Canton, Ohio, in 1922, Bowser sought out Ralph Hay, the manager of the Bulldogs. Hay and Bowser agreed on a sum of $250 a game. However, the Frankford Yellow Jackets also sought out Bower's services. He ended up playing for both teams. On Saturdays, he played for the Yellow Jackets. The Bulldogs played on Sunday, and, because of Pennsylvania blue laws, the Yellow Jackets played on Saturdays. So after the Yellow Jackets game, he would ride an overnight train for Canton, to play for the Bulldogs on Sundays. On one Thanksgiving weekend, he reportedly played 60 minutes of football in four consecutive games. 1922 was the first year that the NFL required everyone to sign a contract, instead of an oral agreement sealed by a handshake. One of the clauses in that contract was that a player could play for only one team in the 'association' (league). That clause was aimed at eliminating team 'hopping'. However Bowser still played with other teams that year besides Canton. The key words in that clause were 'association team', and according to Bowser, he felt that teams not members of the NFL were exempt from this rule.

However most college officials tried to steer their personnel away from the pro game. This made Arda give up a coaching career in favor of playing professionally. In 1922 Arda won the 1922 NFL Championship with the Canton Bulldogs, when he was made the team's kicker, after Pete Henry injured his foot. Arda replaced Jim Thorpe and played both fullback and linebacker.

In 1923, Bowser got a job with the White Motor Company in Cleveland, Ohio. This led him to play for Cleveland Indians because he could also travel to Philadelphia to play with the Yellow Jackets. On again he found himself in a scenario whereone team played on Saturday and the other on Sunday. However, the Indians could not draw in the crowds. When Cleveland played the Oorang Indians, featuring Jim Thorpe, the Cleveland manager thought he could promote his team by having Arda challenge Thorpe in a kicking competition. During the competition, Thorpe bested Bowser in punting, while Bowser bested Thorpe in kicking. It was at this time, that Bowser became the first professional football player to use a tee for kicking. He designed the tee with the help of his coach from Bucknell, Pete Reynolds.

In 1924, the White Motor Company transferred Arda to Pittsburgh, Pennsylvania. There he served as a salesman for the area and was selected for supervisor training. However, the company told Bowser that he had to give up playing football on the weekends or his job would be terminated. He decided that his job was too important. With a wife and new obligations, he could not give up his career. However Bowser still played on weekends, under an alias and playing for teams in small towns such as Mount Carmel. His playing career officially ended after the 1924 season.

== Post-football ==
Over time, Bowser became an insurance executive. However, a massive heart attack in 1947 forced him to retire. He had been told by doctors that he had a year to live. He moved to Florida in 1947, and lived for almost another 50 years.

== 75th Season ==
Bowser was interviewed in 1994 for the special 75 Seasons: The Story of the National Football League, produced for Turner Network Television by NFL Films. He was interviewed by Phil Tuckett. Tuckett later called Bowser "one of the easiest interviewees to work with." To tie together the beginning and the present of the pro game, the NFL held a ceremony in which Bowser would stand next to the current NFL stars. The ceremony took place on first game of the 1994 season in a game between the Tampa Bay Buccaneers and the Indianapolis Colts. It was decided that a Buccaneers' game would be the easiest for Bowser, now a resident of Winter Park, Florida, to attend. The Buccaneers, went beyond just having Bowser on the field to turning the event into an appreciation ceremony for Bowser.

== Oldest pro ==
As part of its 75th anniversary celebrations in 1994, the NFL honored Bowser, then 95, as the league's oldest living ex-NFL player. It was only later that NFL officials discovered that they had made a mistake – because Ralph Horween (then 99), who had played for the Chicago Cardinals in 1921–23 season, was still alive and living in Virginia. Horween later became the first NFL player to live to 100 years of age.

== Halls of Fame ==
- In 1979, Bowser was elected into the Bucknell University Athletics Hall of Fame.
- In 1973, he was inducted into the Ford City Hall of Fame in 1973.
- In 1973, he was inducted into the Armstrong County Sportsman's Hall of Fame.

== Family ==
Arda had five children: Marilyn B. Siff, Nevin G. Bowser, Robert S. Bowser, Ann Murphy and Thomas A. Bowser. His father was a Baptist minister. At the time of his death, a memorial service was held at the Montgomeryville Baptist Church in Montgomeryville, Pennsylvania, where Arda's father had been a pastor.
