= AirPower (Apple) =

Cancelled wireless charger produced by Apple, Inc.

- AirPower promotional image
- Developer: Apple Inc.
- Type: Wireless charging mat
- Released: Announced for early 2018, canceled in 2019

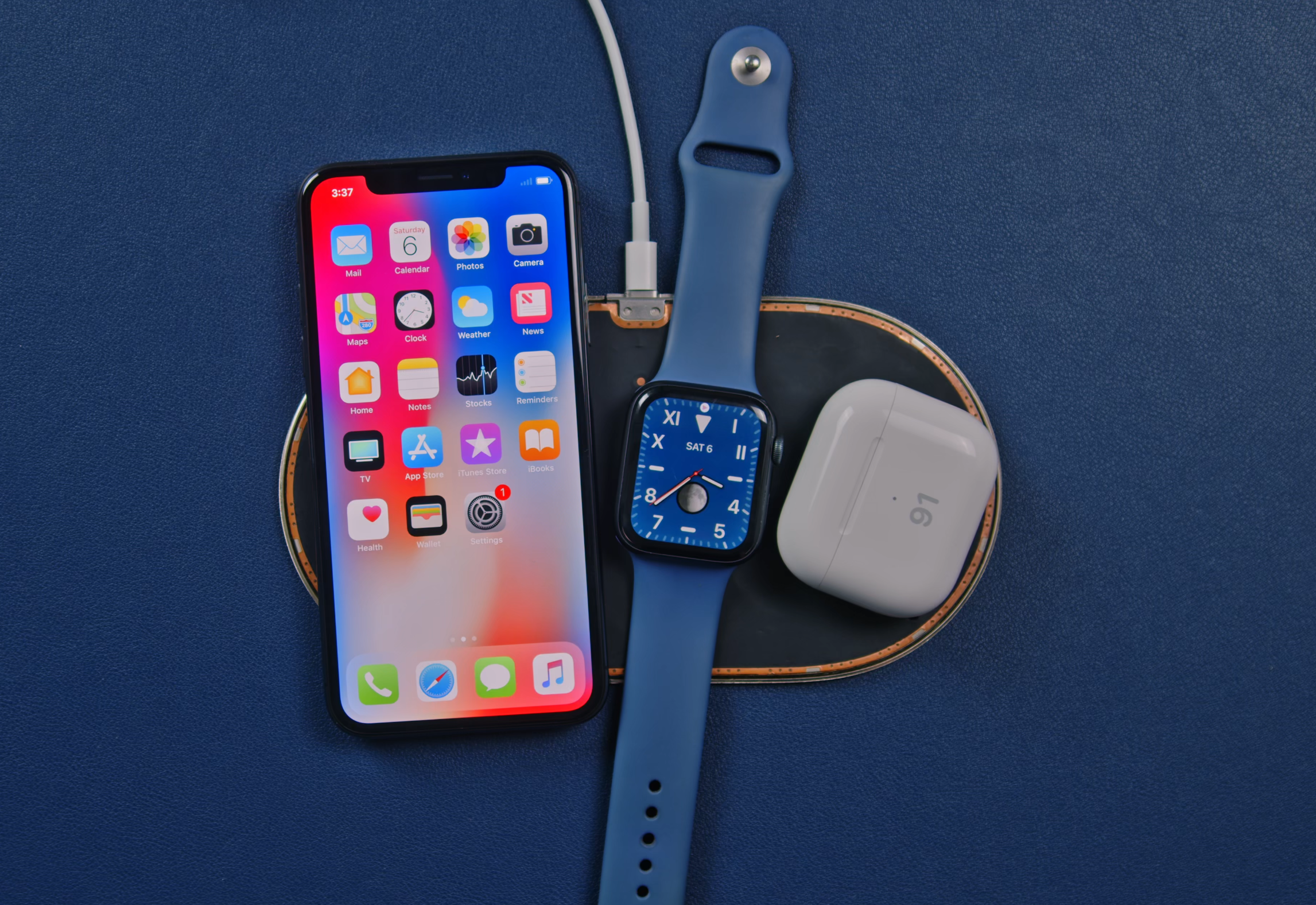
A non-functional late stage prototype of the AirPower displayed with an iPhone X, Apple Watch, and AirPods case

AirPower is an unreleased wireless charging mat developed by Apple Inc. It was designed to charge up to three devices simultaneously, supporting two Qi devices, such as an iPhone and AirPods, and an Apple Watch. It was announced on September 12, 2017. Formerly scheduled to be released in early 2018, AirPower failed to materialize, leading to wide speculation over the product's future, until Apple announced on March 29, 2019 that it had canceled the release.

== Development ==
AirPower was announced on September 12, 2017, at a media event held at Apple's Steve Jobs Theater, in conjunction with the announcement of the iPhone 8, iPhone X, and Wireless Charging Case for AirPods. Following the event, non-functional prototype models were displayed for attendees.

=== Issues ===
AirPower missed its announced release window of "early 2018" without explanation. Immediately after another media event held in September 2018, Apple removed almost all mentions of AirPower from its website. There were reportedly several development issues that led to this decision, with heat management, inter-device communication and speed, as well as mechanical and interference issues all being rumored. Reportedly, the main engineering issue came from including coils for two charging standards, as the Apple Watch uses a proprietary non-Qi standard. Blogger John Gruber wrote that he had heard of issues with the device's design: "Something about the multi-coil design getting too hot — way too hot. There are engineers who looked at AirPower's design and said it could never work thermally."

AirPower was still mentioned in the packaging of several Apple products, including iPhone XS and iPhone XR, and in January 2019 media outlets reported that AirPower may have entered production. On March 25, 2019, Apple released iOS 12.2 with support for AirPower. On March 26, 2019, Apple shipped the Wireless Charging Case for AirPods featuring AirPower on the packaging. Also in late March, Apple secured a trademark on the AirPower name.

However, on March 29, 2019, Dan Riccio, Apple's senior vice president of hardware engineering, said in a statement emailed to TechCrunch: "After much effort, we've concluded AirPower will not achieve our high standards and we have canceled the project." The move was unprecedented for Apple as it had never previously canceled an announced hardware product.

Third party accessory makers mimicked AirPower's design and functionality but were unable to fully replicate Apple's planned features, such as freely placing devices. Apple later sold three-device chargers designed by Mophie and Belkin with the ability to simultaneously charge two Qi devices and an Apple Watch, albeit with a separate receptacle for Apple Watch's inductive charger. Apple released its first Qi chargers in 2020 using the proprietary MagSafe standard.

== Specifications ==
=== Hardware ===
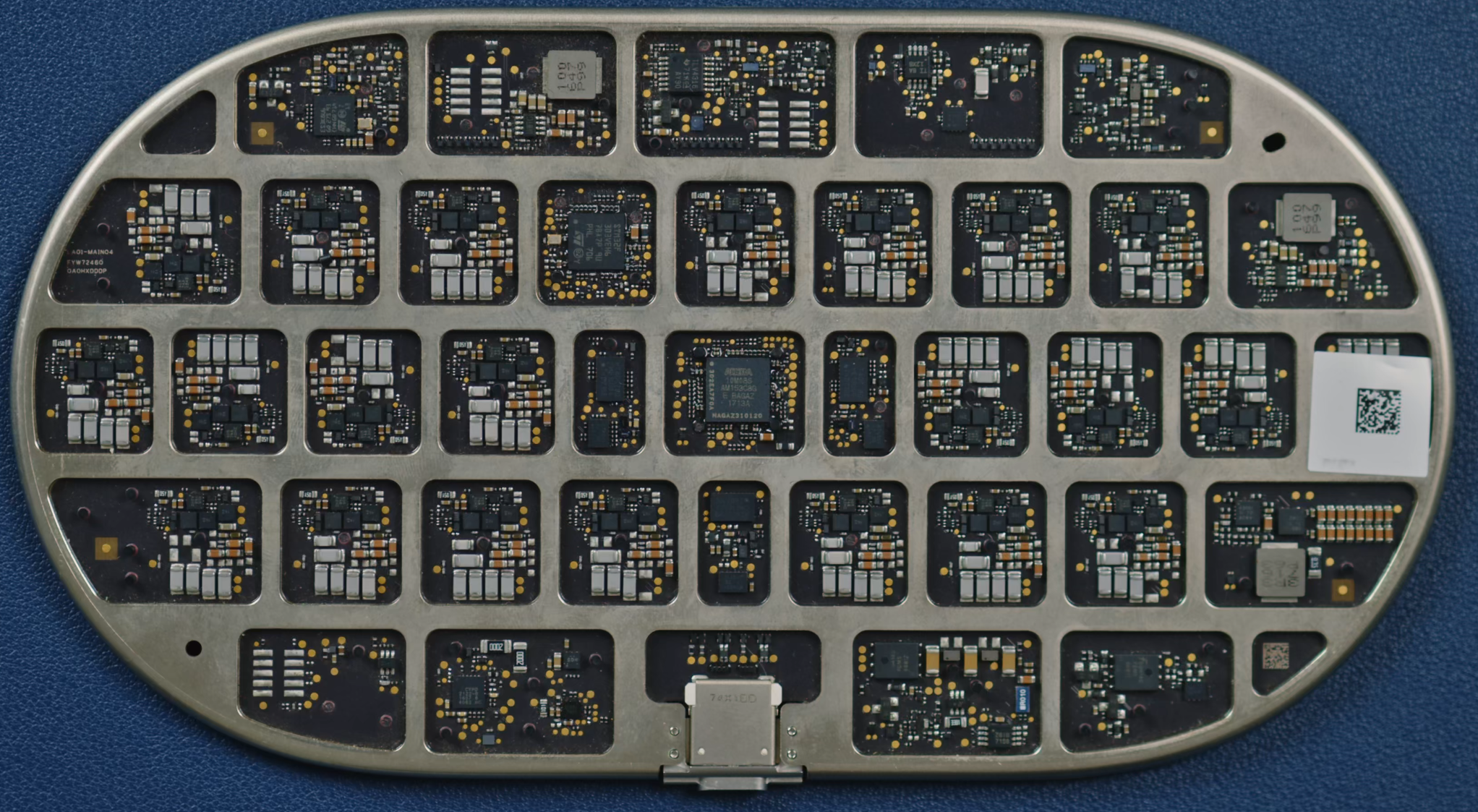
The PCB on a prototype of the AirPower featuring an Altera FPGA

The AirPower concept was based on the Qi standard. Apple had intended for it to be capable of charging multiple devices simultaneously, a feature not supported by the Qi standard, though Apple was working towards incorporating it. Apple intended for a locked iPhone, charging on AirPower, to concurrently display the charge levels of other Apple devices charging wirelessly within close proximity. This is because devices such as AirPods do not have granular charge status indicators as they lack a display.

Devices would not need to be carefully aligned on the charging mat due to the presence of over twenty charging coils, which could charge a device regardless of exact position. However, these charging coils in close proximity ran too hot, requiring power management for the charging mat. The overheating has been one of the reasons attributed to the product's development issues and eventual cancellation.

=== Compatibility ===
AirPower was intended to be compatible with the following devices:

- iPhones released in 2017 and later (iPhone 8, iPhone X and newer)
- Apple Watch Series 3 and newer
- AirPods Wireless Charging Case
