= Mitchell Schwartz =

American football player (born 1989)

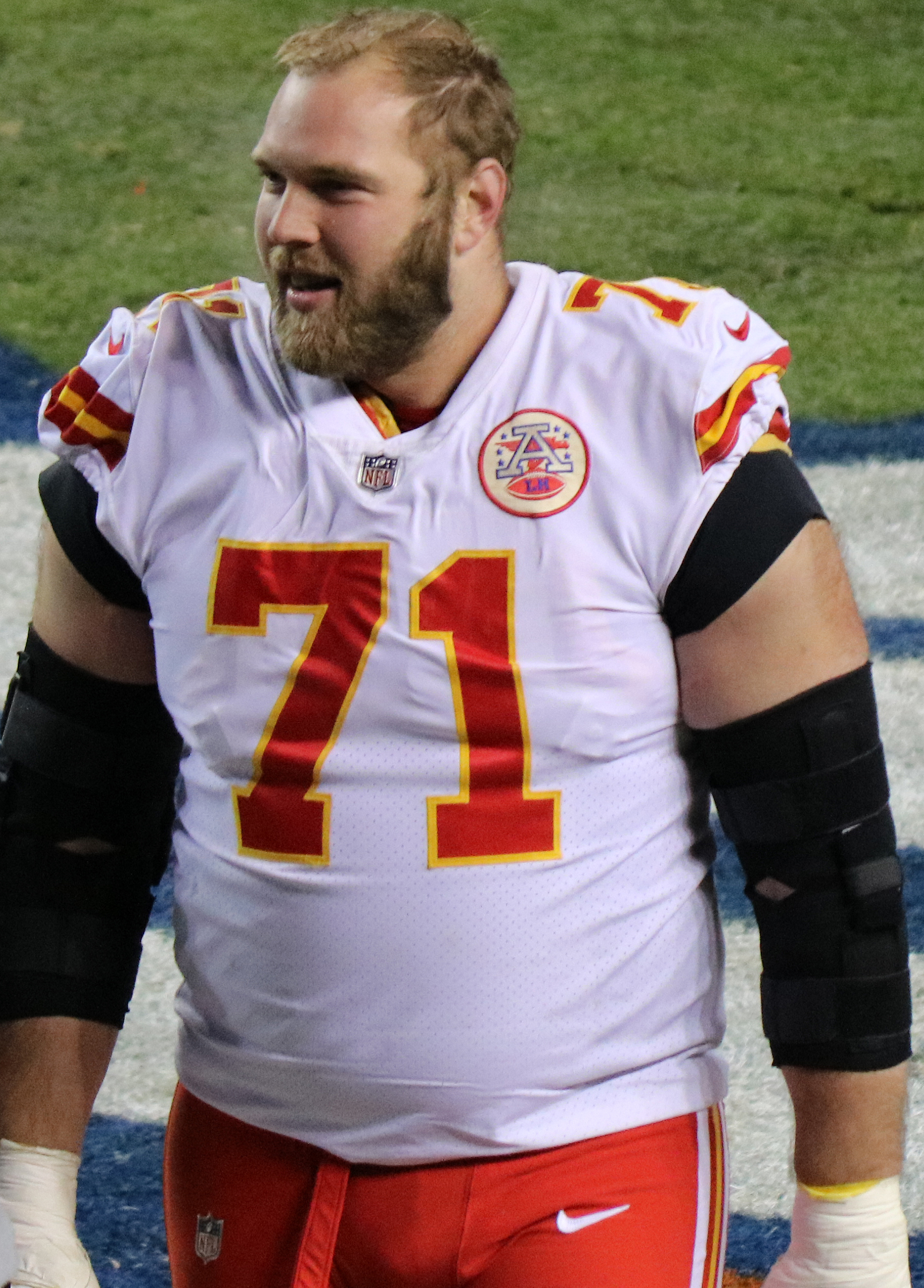
- Schwartz with the Kansas City Chiefs in 2017

No. 72, 71
- Position: Offensive tackle

Personal information
- Born: June 8, 1989 (age 37); Pacific Palisades, California, U.S.
- Listed height: 6 ft 5 in (1.96 m)
- Listed weight: 320 lb (145 kg)

Career information
- High school: Palisades Charter (Pacific Palisades)
- College: California (2007–2011)
- NFL draft: 2012: 2nd round, 37th overall pick

Career history
- Cleveland Browns (2012–2015); Kansas City Chiefs (2016–2020)

Awards and highlights
- Super Bowl champion (LIV); First-team All-Pro (2018); 3× Second-team All-Pro (2016, 2017, 2019); PFWA All-Rookie Team (2012); First-team All-Pac-12 (2011); Second-team All-Pac-10 (2010)

Career NFL statistics
- Games played: 134
- Games started: 134
- Stats at Pro Football Reference

Mitchell Bryan Schwartz (born June 8, 1989) is an American former professional football player who was an offensive tackle for nine seasons in the National Football League (NFL). Schwartz was selected by the Cleveland Browns in the second round of the 2012 NFL draft.

Schwartz played college football for the California Golden Bears. He started all 51 games possible from 2008 to 2011, at either left tackle or right tackle. He was named second-team All-Pac-10 as a junior, and first-team All-Pac-12 and Pac-12 All-Academic as a senior. He also earned honorable mention Pac-10 All-Academic (2008–10), and the Brick Muller Award as Cal's Most Valuable Offensive Lineman (2009–11), for three seasons each.

He was named to the Pro Football Focus (PFF) 2012 All-Rookie Team, lauded for his "top-notch pass blocking", and to the 2014 PFF All-Third Year Team. He signed with the Kansas City Chiefs in 2015. Following the 2018 season, he was named the winner of the Pro Football Focus Matthews Award, given out by the organization to their highest-rated offensive lineman each year, and was named a First-team All-Pro by the Associated Press. In 2019 he was named to the CBS Sports' NFL All-Decade Team. He has started over 120 consecutive games, and had 7,894 consecutive snaps (which made him the active iron man leader in the snaps category).

== Early life ==
Schwartz was born in Pacific Palisades, California and grew up in West Los Angeles. He is the son of Lee Schwartz, a business consultant to manufacturing companies, and Olivia Goodkin, an attorney. Schwartz is Jewish, and was raised in Conservative Judaism. His Hebrew name is Mendel. Schwartz and his brother Geoff authored the book Eat my Schwartz: Our Story of NFL Football, Food, Family, and Faith.

Schwartz didn't start playing football until he was a freshman in high school. When he started the ninth grade, he was already 6 feet 5 inches (1.96 m) tall and 240 pounds (110 kg), too big for the size restrictions of the local Pop Warner youth leagues. Additionally, his parents wanted him to instead focus on studying for his Bar Mitzvah.

His brother, offensive guard Geoff, played in the NFL for four different teams. Geoff and Mitchell are the first Jewish brothers to play in the NFL since Ralph Horween and Arnold Horween, in 1923.

His father, speaking of the fact that he has two sons playing in the National Football League, said: "I just kvell." His mother, commenting on having two sons play football, said:

I started out worrying that they were going to get hurt, but then I realized it was the other players I should be worrying about. They were like trucks hitting small cars. And I started to kind of feel like maybe this was their destiny.

== High school career ==
Schwartz attended Palisades Charter High School. Playing football for his high school team, on which he was the team captain, he was regarded as a three-star offensive tackle prospect by Rivals.com; Scout.com ranked him #23.

He began as a quarterback, but quickly moved over to offensive tackle where he was a four-year starter. Schwartz was a two-time All-State "underclassman" pick, and earned 2005 All-Western League and All-City honors as a junior. As a senior, he was the 2006 California Interscholastic Federation (CIF) Los Angeles City Offensive Lineman of the Year, 2006 Western League Lineman of the Year, and received Prepstar 2006 All-West Region honors.

Schwartz was also an all-league pitcher on the school baseball team. Academically, he had a 4.3 GPA and a 34 ACT, and was named to the Principal's Honor Roll and Dean's List.

Coming out of high school, he received football offers from Cal, Michigan, Stanford, Virginia, Tennessee, Oregon, and Washington State. At a spring LA Scout.com combine, Schwartz measured 6 feet 5.5 inches (1.969 m) tall, and weighed 303 pounds (137 kg). He ran the 40-yard dash in 5.28, and had a time in the 20-yard shuttle of 4.87; he also had a time in the shuttle of 4.78 at the Stanford Nike combine.

== College career ==
Schwartz attended the University of California, Berkeley, from 2007 to December 2011. He graduated with a bachelor's degree in American Studies, with an emphasis on human development and identity.

He redshirted in 2007. In 2008, Schwartz started all 13 games for the California Golden Bears, the first three games at right tackle and the remaining 10 at left tackle. He was named a second-team Freshman All-American by College Football News, received the Bob Tessier Award as Cal's Most Improved Offensive Lineman, and received honorable mention Pac-10 All-Academic honors.

In 2009, Schwartz started all 13 games at right tackle. He was Lindy's second-team preseason All-Pac-10, was Athlon third-team preseason All-Pac-10, was a Phil Steele preseason, midseason, and postseason third-team All-Pac-10 choice, received All-Pac-10 honorable mention and Pac-10 All-Academic honorable mention, and received Cal's Brick Muller Award as its Most Valuable Offensive Lineman.

In 2010, he started all 12 games at left tackle, heading an offensive line that blocked for 1,167-yard rusher Shane Vereen. Schwartz was a second-team preseason All-Pac-10 choice by Athlon, Lindy's, and Steele, as Steele also listed him as the nation's # 63 draft-eligible tackle. He was a second-team All-Pac-10 choice, and was first-team on Phil Steele's midseason All-Pac-10 team and second-team on his postseason All-Pac-10 squad. Schwartz was a member of the Jewish Sports Review's 2010 College Football All-America Team, received Cal's Brick Muller Award as its Most Valuable Offensive Lineman for the second straight year, and won Cal's Andy Smith Award as its player with the most Big "C" time. He was also an honorable mention Pac-10 All-Academic selection for the third consecutive season.

In 2011, Schwartz started all 13 games at left tackle. It was the fourth consecutive season in which he started each of Cal's games. He headed an offensive line that blocked for 1,322-yard rushing tailback Isi Sofele, who rushed for the sixth-highest total in Cal history. He helped the team average 28.3 points and 401.5 yards per game.

Schwartz was a first-team All-Pac-10 preseason choice of Athlon, Phil Steele (who named him the nation's # 24 draft-eligible tackle), and Sporting News, a Lindy's second-team preseason All-Pac-10 pick (whom they listed as one of Cal's "Players to Watch"), and a third-team preseason All-American by GoDaddy.com and Sporting News. He was a second-team midseason All-Pac-12 selection of Steele. He received Cal's Brick Muller Award as its Most Valuable Offensive Lineman for the third straight season, and received a Cort Majors Captains Award on offense. He was on the watch lists for the Outland Trophy and the Lombardi Award. He was voted first-team All-Pac-12, and was a first-team All-Pac-12 selection of ESPN Pac-12 Blog and Phil Steele, as well as a second-team pick of College Sports Madness and Yahoo! Sports.

In his California career, Schwartz started all 51 games possible from 2008 to 2011, at either left tackle (35 starts) or right tackle (16 starts), falling 1 start short of Syd'Quan Thompson's school record of 52, and missing only one snap—when he had to come out because his shoelace snapped, and he had to have it replaced. At the 2012 Senior Bowl, he started at right tackle for the winning North team, and had what was viewed as an impressive showing.

== Professional career ==
=== Pre-draft ===
Schwartz took part in the 2012 NFL Combine. He completed 23 reps of 225 pounds in the bench press, and had times of 5.38 in the 40-yard dash, 7.86 in the 3-cone drill, and 4.87 in the 20-yard shuttle. He had a vertical jump of 26.5", and a broad jump of 7' 5". He has a 33.5-inch arm length, an 81 5/8-inch wingspan, 10-inch hands, and wears size 18 shoes. Due to his shoe size, in college one of his nicknames was "Bigfoot" (he was also known as "Big Show", because he bears a facial and physical resemblance to the giant WWE pro wrestler Big Show).

He scored a 35 on the Wonderlic test at the combine. A score of 20–21 is considered average.

Pre-draft measurables
| Height | Weight | Arm length | Hand span | Wingspan | 40-yard dash | 10-yard split | 20-yard split | 20-yard shuttle | Three-cone drill | Vertical jump | Broad jump | Bench press | Wonderlic |
|---|---|---|---|---|---|---|---|---|---|---|---|---|---|
| 6 ft 5 3/8 in (1.97 m) | 318 lb (144 kg) | 33 1/2 in (0.85 m) | 10 in (0.25 m) | 6 ft 9 1/2 in (2.07 m) | 5.45 s | 1.92 s | 3.16 s | 4.87 s | 7.86 s | 26.5 in (0.67 m) | 7 ft 5 in (2.26 m) | 23 reps | 35 |
All values from NFL Combine

=== Cleveland Browns ===
==== 2012 season ====
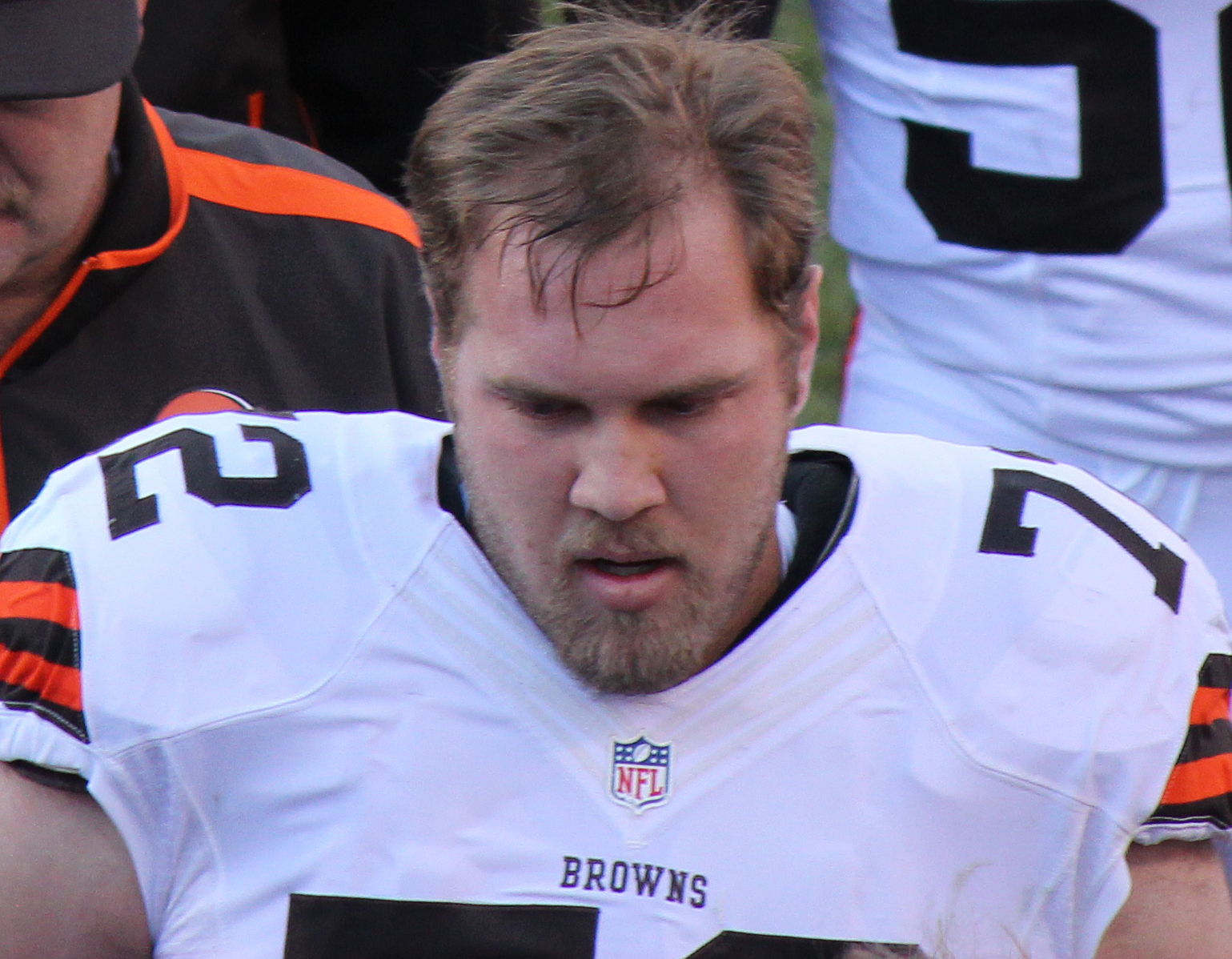
Schwartz with the Browns in 2012.

Schwartz was selected in the second round with the 37th overall pick by the Cleveland Browns in the 2012 NFL draft. ESPN's NFL draft analyst Mel Kiper Jr. called Schwartz "the key pick" of the draft for the Browns. He was Cal's highest selection in the 2012 draft, and its first offensive lineman picked in the NFL draft since Alex Mack was also taken by Cleveland in the first round in 2009. He signed a four-year contract with the Browns in May 2012, for $5.17 million.

In 2012, Schwartz started all 16 games for the Browns, and all 1,064 offensive snaps, of his rookie year at right tackle. He was the only Browns rookie, and one of six NFL rookie offensive linemen, to start every game. Schwartz was named to the Pro Football Focus (PFF) 2012 All-Rookie Team, lauded for his "top-notch pass blocking". He was named to the PFWA All-Rookie Team.

==== 2013 season ====
In 2013, Schwartz again started all 16 games for the Browns, and played all offensive snaps (1,106). He and the Browns faced his brother's team, the Chiefs, at Arrowhead Stadium in Kansas City on October 27, 2013, and the two became the first Jewish siblings to play against each other in NFL history.

==== 2014 season ====
In 2014, Schwartz for the third straight year started all 16 games for the Browns, and played all offensive snaps. He was named to the 2014 PFF All-Third Year Team.

==== 2015 season ====
In 2015, Schwartz started all 16 games for the Browns for the fourth consecutive season, playing all offensive snaps. He recovered two fumbles on the season. Pro Football Focus graded him at 80.8. He was named to the Pro Football Focus All-Pro Second-team. Since Schwartz was selected, in his four years with the Browns, he started every single game at right tackle, without missing one offensive snap.

=== Kansas City Chiefs ===
==== 2016 season ====
On March 9, 2016, Schwartz signed a five-year, $33 million contract with the Kansas City Chiefs, making him one of the highest-paid right tackles in the NFL. At the conclusion on the 2016 season, he had started all 96 games of his first six years, without missing a snap. He was named to the Associated Press All-Pro Second-team.

==== 2017 season ====
In the 2017 season, he started in all 16 games and the Wild Card Round loss to the Tennessee Titans. Schwartz was named to the Associated Press All-Pro Second-team.

==== 2018 season ====
In the 2018 season, Schwartz started in all 16 games and the two playoff games for the Chiefs. Pro Football Focus graded him at 83.8, and gave him the Bruce Matthews Award as the NFL's top offensive lineman. For the first time as a professional, he was named a First-team All-Pro by the Associated Press; he was also named First-team All-Pro by Pro Football Focus and by Pro Football Writers. He was ranked 94th by his fellow players on the NFL Top 100 Players of 2019.

==== 2019 season ====
On June 12, 2019, Schwartz signed a one-year contract extension with the Chiefs through the 2021 season for $11.255 million, making him the second-highest paid right tackle in the NFL. He was named to the Associated Press All-Pro Second-team, and to the 2019 Pro Football Writers of America All-AFC Team. He was also named to the CBS Sports' NFL All-Decade Team. Schwartz won his first Super Bowl when the Chiefs defeated the San Francisco 49ers in Super Bowl LIV.

Schwartz had never missed a snap in his NFL career spanning parts of eight seasons and 121 games, until a knee injury forced him out of a Kansas City loss to the Tennessee Titans for three snaps in November 2019, and after 7,894 snaps his streak—then the longest among active players in the NFL—came to an end. Schwartz did in that game start his 122nd-consecutive game, behind only Chargers quarterback Philip Rivers (218 games) and Baltimore cornerback Brandon Carr (184).

==== 2020 season ====
During practice prior to the Chiefs' Week 6 game against the Buffalo Bills, Schwartz injured his back. Despite the injury, he still played. For only the second time in his career, however, he came out of the game, after aggravating the injury. On October 23, the Chiefs announced he would miss their Week 7 game against the Denver Broncos. It was the first time in his career that he missed a game. He was placed on the reserve/COVID-19 list by the Chiefs on November 16, 2020, and activated three days later. He was placed on injured reserve on November 21, 2020. He underwent surgery to repair his back injury on February 24, 2021.

Schwartz was released after five seasons on March 11, 2021.

=== Retirement ===
After not playing the entire 2021 season, Schwartz announced his retirement from the NFL on July 14, 2022.

== Honors ==
In 2016, Schwartz was inducted into the Southern California Jewish Sports Hall of Fame.

== See also ==
- List of Jewish football players
