= Geoff Schwartz =

American football player (born 1986)

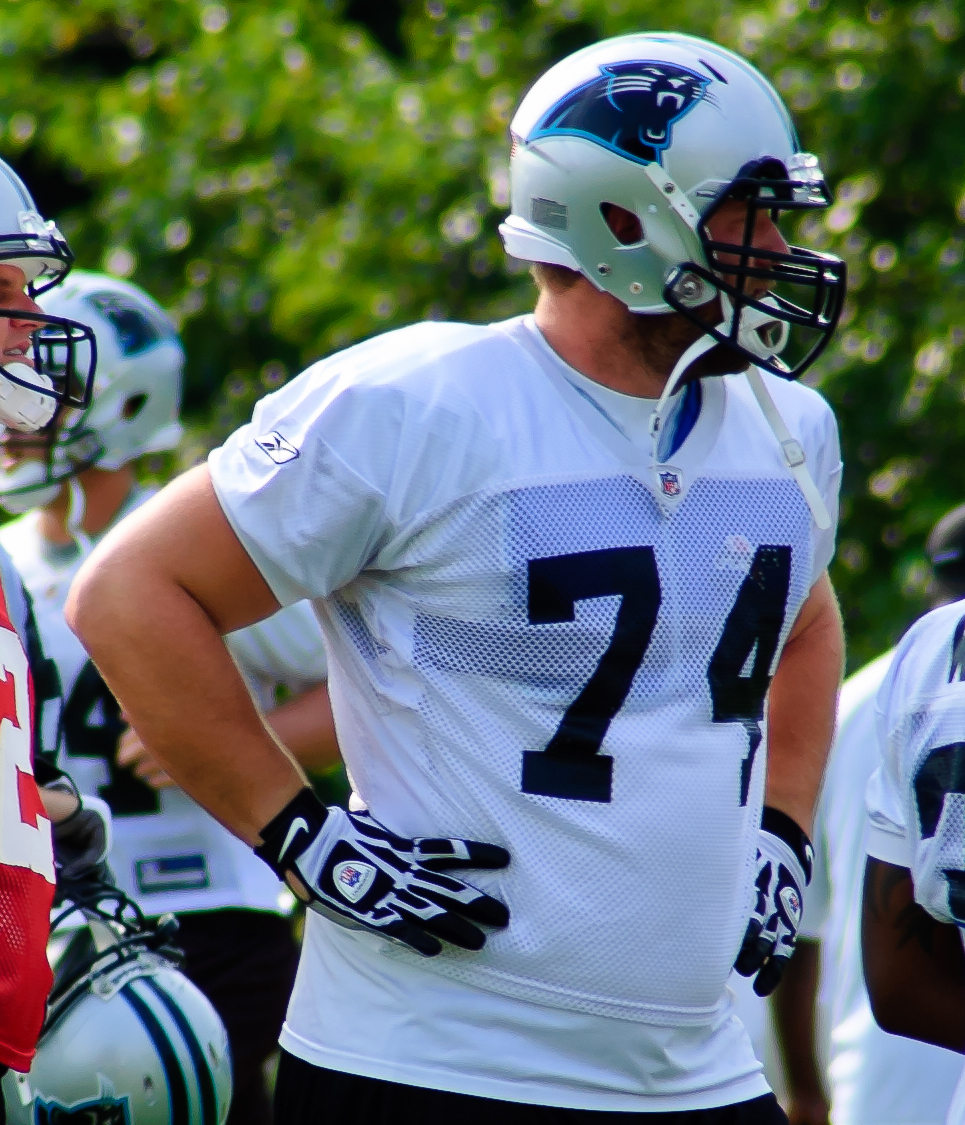
- Schwartz with the Carolina Panthers in 2010

No. 74, 76
- Position: Offensive guard

Personal information
- Born: July 11, 1986 (age 40); Los Angeles, California, U.S.
- Listed height: 6 ft 6 in (1.98 m)
- Listed weight: 340 lb (154 kg)

Career information
- High school: Palisades Charter (Pacific Palisades, California)
- College: Oregon (2004–2007)
- NFL draft: 2008: 7th round, 241st overall pick

Career history
- Carolina Panthers (2008–2011); Minnesota Vikings (2012); Kansas City Chiefs (2013); New York Giants (2014–2015); Detroit Lions (2016)*
- * Offseason or practice squad member only

Awards and highlights
- Second-team All-Pac-10 (2007)

Career NFL statistics
- Games played: 73
- Games started: 39
- Stats at Pro Football Reference

Geoffrey Isaiah Schwartz (born July 11, 1986) is an American former professional football player who was an offensive guard in the National Football League (NFL). He was selected by the Carolina Panthers in the seventh round of the 2008 NFL draft, and played for them from 2008 to 2011. He was also a member of the Minnesota Vikings, Kansas City Chiefs, New York Giants, and Detroit Lions. Schwartz played college football at the University of Oregon, for the Ducks. He started for three years at right tackle, and in his senior year was a second-team All-Pac-10 selection.

== Early life ==
Schwartz was born in Los Angeles, California. He is the son of Lee Schwartz, a business consultant to manufacturing companies, and Olivia Goodkin, an attorney.

Schwartz is Jewish, and was raised in Conservative Judaism, observing all the Jewish holidays. He attended Hebrew school and synagogue Adat Shalom in West Los Angeles. His Hebrew name is Gedalia Yitzhak. When he is on the road during the Jewish holiday of Hanukkah, he carries a menorah with him and lights its candles in his hotel room.

Schwartz did not start playing football until age 13. Firstly, he was too heavy for the weight requirements of the local youth program. Secondly, his parents wanted him to instead focus on studying for his Bar Mitzvah.

Schwartz attended Palisades Charter High School. There, he was the starting center on the basketball team. He was also an All-League pitcher in baseball, throwing in the upper-80s miles-per-hour. As a pitcher, he had a 13–6 record with a 1.30 ERA, 4 saves, and 130 strikeouts in his last two years.

In addition, he played football for the high school team, on both the offensive line and the defensive line. He played tackle and guard on offense, and nose guard, defensive end, and defensive tackle on defense. He was rated first-team All-City and All-Westside by the L.A. Times, California's 5th-best offensive line recruit by Tom Lemming, among the top 75 prep prospects in California by Super Prep, 36th on the Rivals.com list of the nation's top offensive tackle prospects, and included among the Tacoma News Tribune's Western One-hundred selections.

== College career ==
Schwartz played college football at the University of Oregon. His major was political science. Schwartz started for three years at right tackle, playing in 41 games (36 starts). He had the team's best record in the squat strength training exercise, at 505 pounds (229 kg).

In 2005, as a sophomore, Schwartz started all 12 games and allowed only three sacks. In 2006, as a junior, he played in 12 games with 11 starts. In 2007, as a senior, Schwartz started all 13 games and helped the team lead the Pac-10 in rushing for a second consecutive year. He was a second-team 2007 All-Pac-10 selection. Schwartz holds the Pac-10 record for rushing by a right tackle, at three yards.

== Professional career ==
Pre-draft measurables
Height	Weight	Arm length	Hand span	40-yard dash	10-yard split	20-yard split	20-yard shuttle	Three-cone drill	Vertical jump	Broad jump
6 ft 6 1/4 in (1.99 m)	332 lb (151 kg)	33 1/4 in (0.84 m)	11 in (0.28 m)	5.36 s	1.80 s	3.04 s	4.79 s	7.90 s	20.5 in (0.52 m)	8 ft 2 in (2.49 m)
All values from NFL Combine

=== Carolina Panthers ===
Schwartz was selected by the Panthers in the seventh round of the 2008 NFL draft. That year, he was on the Panthers' practice squad, after being waived in the final training camp roster cut.

In 2009, he played in all 16 games with 3 starts at right tackle. In 2010, he started all 16 games (the first 5 at right tackle, and the last 11 at right guard), and played 1,016 snaps. In 2011, he was projected to start at right guard again, but suffered an injured right hip consisting of a hip impingement (a bone spur in his femur that tore his hip cartilage) during practice. He spent the season on the injured reserve list, and had hip surgery in September 2011.

=== Minnesota Vikings ===
On March 21, 2012, Schwartz signed a one-year deal with the Minnesota Vikings. He played right guard in parts of 13 games for the team in 2012, and helped running back Adrian Peterson rush for 2,097 yards, just 9 yards short of the NFL single-season record.

=== Kansas City Chiefs ===
Schwartz signed with the Kansas City Chiefs on March 15, 2013. His one-year contract was worth up to $1.2 million, including incentives.

Schwartz was expected to compete either with Donald Stephenson to start at right tackle, or with Jon Asamoah and Jeff Allen for playing time at guard. On October 27, Geoff played against his brother, Mitchell, for the first time.

He played in all 16 games for the Chiefs, starting 7 of them, moving into the starting lineup at right guard in the latter part of the season. He received a plus-18.6 Pro Football Focus grade in 549 snaps, the highest grade of any Chiefs offensive lineman, and was rated as the top free-agent guard by the site. Pro Football Focus wrote:

"Schwartz has played as well as any [guard] not named Evan Mathis on a per-snap basis the last two years.... has an overall grade of +24.1 in 792 snaps (full season is typically 1000+ snaps) since he missed the whole 2011 season with a hip injury. While he had a superb year in pass protection with a pass blocking efficiency of 97.3 (ranked 11th), Schwartz’ calling card is his run blocking. He has elite power at the point of attack, but he also rarely gets beat cleanly. He had the sixth-lowest percentage of run snaps that took a downgrade among all guards."

=== New York Giants ===
On March 12, 2014, Schwartz signed a four-year, $16.8 million deal with $6.2 million guaranteed with the New York Giants. ESPN reported that he was in line to start, most likely at left or right guard, for the Giants. PFF and Rotoworld had rated him the #1 free agent guard. In the Giants' third preseason game against the New York Jets, Schwartz suffered a broken toe and missed the first eleven weeks of the regular season. After his return, he started against the Dallas Cowboys and Jacksonville Jaguars. In the game against the Jaguars, he suffered a broken ankle and was ruled out for the rest of the season.

On November 29, 2015, Schwartz sustained a broken left leg in the Week 12 loss to the Washington Redskins. During the 2015 season, Schwartz started 11 games at guard for the Giants before missing the final five games due to injury. On December 1, 2015, Schwartz was placed on season-ending injured reserve. On February 10, 2016, Schwartz was released by the Giants.

=== Detroit Lions ===
On March 30, 2016, Schwartz signed a one-year contract with the Detroit Lions. The Lions released Schwartz on August 29, 2016.

=== NFL retirement ===
On February 21, 2017, Schwartz announced his retirement from the NFL.

=== Media ===
In July 2020 Schwartz debuted a new podcast named Minus Three with Shek and Schwartz with former NFL Network personality Dave Dameshek which focuses on the NFL. The podcast is part of a new sports gambling media company Extra Points founded by Sal Iacono.

On December 3, 2020, Fox Sports Radio announced it had added Schwartz as a full-time weekend show host, after he had periodically filled in for, among others, Clay Travis.

== Honors ==
In 2016 he was inducted into the Southern California Jewish Sports Hall of Fame.

== Personal life ==
Schwartz married in March 2014. Schwartz was co-author of Eat My Schwartz: Our Story of NFL Football, Food, Family, and Faith with his brother, Mitchell. It was published on September 6, 2016. He currently works as a writer for SB Nation and hosts his own podcast titled Block'em Up.

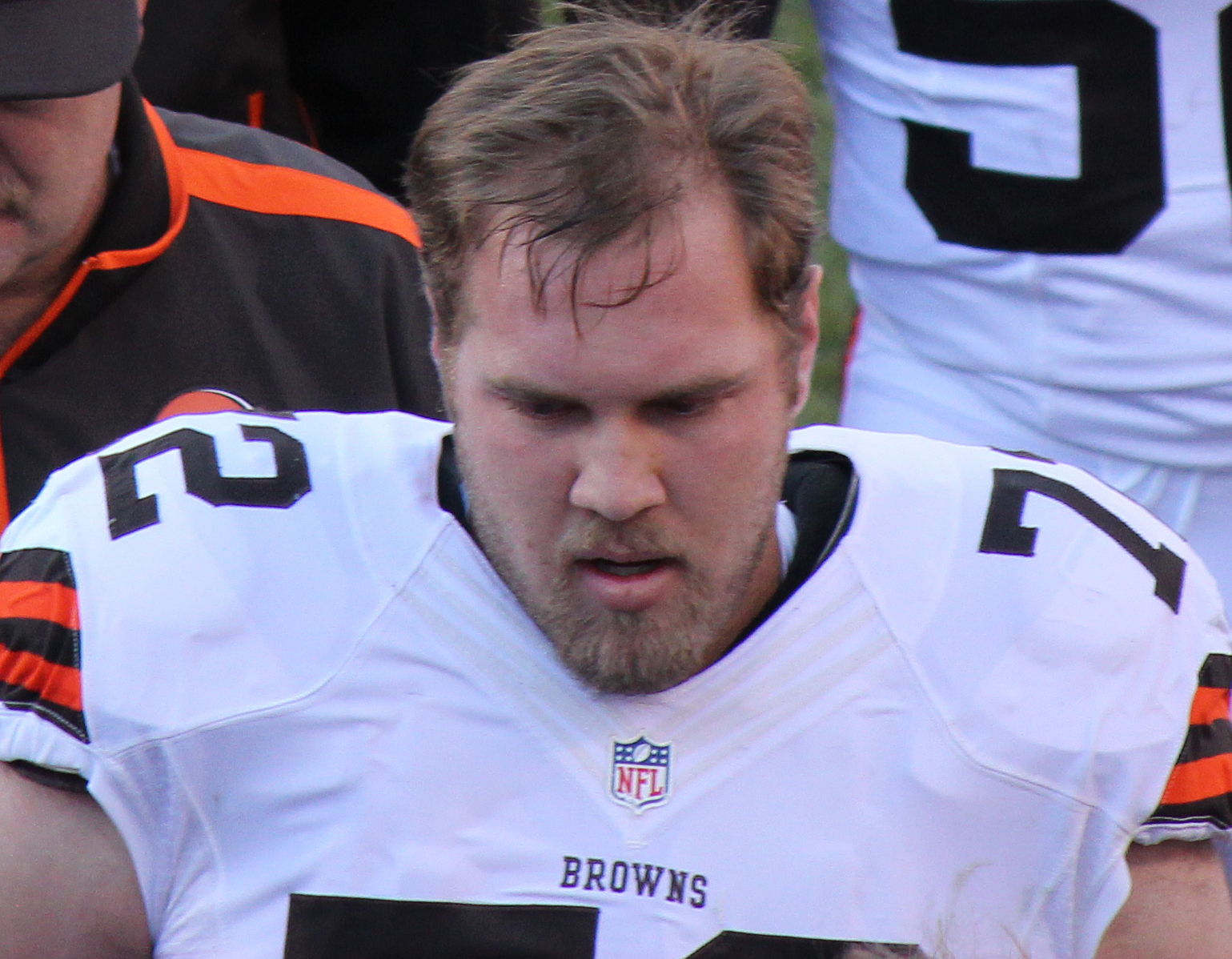
Schwartz's brother, Mitchell, former offensive tackle for the Kansas City Chiefs.

Schwartz credits an excess of matzah ball soup and latkes for their size.

Schwartz is "proud to be a role model to young Jewish kids and athletes, letting them know it's possible for them to reach their goals." “We can’t have a minyan,” referring to the Jewish requirement of 10 Jewish adults to conduct a service. Geoff and Mitchell are the first Jewish brothers to play in the NFL since Ralph Horween and Arnold Horween in 1923.

His father, speaking of the fact that he has two sons playing in the National Football League, said: "I just kvell." His mother, commenting on having two sons play football, said:

I started out worrying that they were going to get hurt, but then I realized it was the other players I should be worrying about. They were like trucks hitting small cars. And I started to kind of feel like maybe this was their destiny.

== See also ==
- List of select Jewish football players
