= Nomad Goods =

American consumer electronics accessory company

Nomad
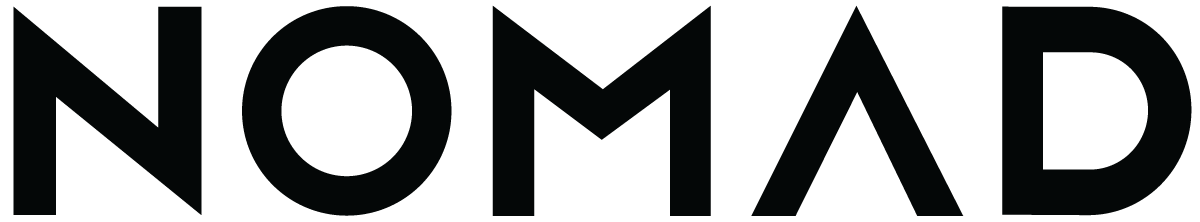
- Type: Private
- Industry: Computer hardware; Mobile device accessories
- Founded: 2012
- Founder: Noah Dentzel; Brian Hahn; Adam Miller
- Headquarters: Santa Barbara, California
- Area served: Worldwide
- Website: www.nomadgoods.com

Nomad is a consumer electronics and lifestyle products company based out of Santa Barbara, California. Their products include leather phone cases, charging cables, portable battery packs, wireless chargers and travel accessories. Nomad began with its first products ChargeCard, ChargeKey and NomadPlus. Founded in 2012, they debuted on Kickstarter on July 18, 2012. In response to COVID-19, Nomad shifted their operations to produce PPE.

== History ==
Nomad was founded by Noah Dentzel, Brian Hahn and Adam Miller in 2012. Sharing a passion for adventure and minimalism, the founders wanted to create a discrete and portable charging device. Their first product, ChargeCard, was a super-slim USB Cable charger that fit in any wallet like a credit card. They began a campaign to gauge interest in the project and shortly thereafter launched their first product on Kickstarter on July 18, 2012. Their funding goal was $50,000. The product gained attention from investors and managed to triple their target funding goal, ultimately raising $161,897. The founders began production and shipped their first lot of units in the following March. The product gained media attention from The New York Times, AppleInsider, Huffington Post, Mashable, and others.

Over the years Nomad has expanded their product line; Nomad now offers over 50 products for smartphone and smartwatch users, distributed by retailers such as Best Buy, Urban Outfitters, select retailers globally. In 2015, the company made their first non-electronic device, when they launched Stand, an Apple Watch accessory. In 2016 Nomad partnered with Horween Leather Co. and began designing fine leather phone cases, watch straps and wallets. Most recently, Nomad has launched a wireless charging hub for smartphones.

== Products ==
=== ChargeCard ===
ChargeCard was a portable and thin credit card-shaped USB cable charger that fit into any pocket or wallet. The credit card-shaped USB cable had different versions for the iPhone and other mobile phones. The product became popular and gained attention in Forbes, The New York Times, AppleInsider and HuffPost due to its wallet-sized design.

=== ChargeKey ===
Shaped like a housekey, the ChargeKey was Nomad's second product. Crowdfunding began on Indiegogo on October 2, 2013, ultimately raising $172,274. All units were shipped by the end of April 2014. Reception was more favorable than the ChargeCard, earning positive reviews from Time Magazine, AppleInsider, and the Today Show.

== Recognition ==
- The Best Tech Gadgets to Buy for Travelers: Holiday Gift Guide 2013
- 50 Gadget Gift Ideas for the Holidays 2013
- The Man FAQ Holiday Gift Guide 2013
- 8 Gifts for the Tech Geek in Your Life 2013
- 17 Gifts for the Techie Who Has Everything 2013
