= Horween Leather Company =

American company

- Company type: Private
- Industry: Leather tannery
- Founded: Chicago, Illinois (1905; 121 years ago)
- Founder: Isadore Horween
- Headquarters: 2015 North Elston Avenue, Chicago, Illinois, United States
- Revenue: $25 million (2012)
- Number of employees: 160 (2012)
- Website: www.horween.com

Horween Leather Company is an American company specializing in the manufacturing and refining of leather and related products. It is one of the oldest continuously running tanneries in the United States. Since its founding in the early 20th century it has been located in Chicago.

Isadore Horween founded the company in 1905, and worked in it until 1949. His two sons, Arnold Horween (chairman and president; 1949–1984) and Ralph Horween, became executives of the company and worked in it after their careers as All American football players for the Harvard Crimson, and playing in the National Football League.

Arnold's son Arnold Horween Jr. worked with it from 1953 to 2003, and his son Arnold "Skip" Horween III has worked with it since 1972. The fifth generation of Horweens, Nicholas (Nick) Arnold Horween, has worked at the company since 2009.

Horween Leather Company offers an array of tannages using primarily cowhide and horsehide, and also using smaller quantities of calf and bison hides. Its leather is used in a number of products including sports equipment, sports and casual footwear, bags, wallets, briefcases, belts, coats, jackets, and other apparel and accessories. It is known for its production of Shell Cordovan (the Chicago Tribune called it the "Cordovan capital of the world"), professional football leather, and Chromexcel, among other leathers. It is the exclusive supplier of leather for National Football League footballs, and also supplies the leather that is used for National Basketball Association basketballs.

Horween Leather Company is located in a five-story block-long factory at 2015 North Elston Avenue, at Ashland Avenue near the Chicago River.

== History ==
=== 1905–1948 ===
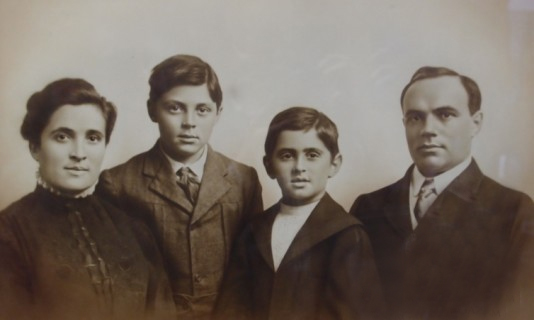
Rose Horween, Ralph Horween, Arnold Horween, and Isidore Horween

Isadore Horween (whose surname was originally Horwitz or Horowitz), who had learned the leather business in his native Ukraine, lived just outside Kiev, immigrated to the United States in 1893. He obtained his first job at a tannery in the U.S. through a contact he made at the 1893 World’s Columbian Exposition in Chicago. For 12 years he worked in one of the then-two-dozen tanneries in Chicago.

He founded I. Horween and Co. in 1905, and established it on Division Street in Chicago. At the time, Chicago was a major center of the meatpacking industry and a major rail hub. The tanneries were built close to the source of raw materials. In 1911, Isadore Horween developed and produced Aniline Chromexcel, one of the company's most traditional tannages.

The company's original focus was the production of razor strops, to sharpen razors used in shaving. With the advent of the safety razor in 1912, however, the need for razor strops waned, and the company shifted its focus to other products.

In 1920, the company moved to its current location in a five-story block-long factory at 2015 North Elston Avenue (at Ashland Avenue), on the Chicago River, in Chicago's Bucktown, on the north side of the city. Isadore Horween had obtained the site, which remains the company's current location, by purchasing it from Herman Loescher and Sons tannery. The company's name was eventually changed to Horween Leather Company.

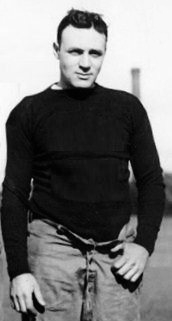
Ralph Horween; he was the company's secretary and treasurer, in between his stints playing football at Harvard and in the NFL alongside his brother Arnold Horween

In 1921, the company's secretary and treasurer was Isadore's son Ralph Horween, during Ralph's career as a football player for the Harvard Crimson and before his career as a player and coach in the National Football League. In 1945, he was still secretary of the company.

In 1927, Horween Leather Company sold the tannery on Division Street, and consolidated its operations at North Elston Avenue. In 1930, it developed mechanical leather, a very durable heavyweight leather for use in oil seals, gaskets, and engine seals. In 1936, the company had 336 workers.

In 1938, Horween Leather Company became the official leather supplier for U.S. Marine Corps water-resistant footwear during World War II. It supplied Chromoexcel, which was used exclusively in the North African Campaign. In 1941, it added a large addition to the tannery.

=== 1949–1984 ===
Isadore's son Arnold Horween eventually took over the company business, after his career as a football player at Harvard alongside his brother Ralph, and then again with his brother as player-coaches in the National Football League, and finally as Harvard's head football coach. He ran the company as chairman and President, from 1949 to 1984.

In 1960, the company developed and offered football leather as it is made and sold today. In 1978 there were 250 tanneries in the U.S., but by 2005 the number had dropped to approximately 20.

=== 1985–present ===
In 1985, Arnold Jr., Isadore's grandson, succeeded his father as Horween Leather Company's chief executive. In 1990, the company developed and offered waterproof lines of leathers.

Arnold, Jr.'s son Arnold "Skip" Horween III, Isadore's great-grandson, joined as treasurer that year, and became vice president in 1995. In 2001, Skip Horween took over running the company, and in 2002 he became president. The company is now run by the fourth generation, with the fifth generation also in house.

In 2003, the company began supplying leather for the Arena Football League. In 2005, the company had sales of over $35 million. In 2006, it became the only tannery in Chicago; at one time, the city had as many as 40.

As of 2012, Horween Leather Company had 160 employees, and annual revenues of approximately $25 million. In a typical week, it processes 4,000 cowhides and 1,000 horsehides into 120,000 square feet (11,000 m^{2}) of leather. As of 2013, Horween Leather Company was one of fewer than a dozen tanneries in the U.S., down from over 250 in 1978.

=== The Horween family ===
The following reflects each generation of the Horween family that worked in the company:

- Isadore Horween, 1905–1949
- Arnold Horween, 1922–1984 (Chairman & President 1949–1984)
- Arnold Horween Jr., 1953–2003
- Arnold (Skip) Horween III, 1972–present
- Nicholas (Nick) Arnold Horween, 2009–present

== The tanning process ==
About 85% of the leather at Horween Leather Company is made from cowhide. The company's workers take raw hides, which arrive salted to prevent deterioration, trim them, and remove their hair with chemicals in an extremely large washing drum. The leather is then treated with salt and pickled for 24 hours, so that it reaches a desired pH level. It is then bated, tanned, and finished.

== Products ==
Horween Leather Company produces many different full grain and corrected grain leathers. Its leather is used in a number of products including footwear, sports equipment, bags, belts, wallets, briefcases, suitcases, jackets, coats, and other apparel and accessories. As of 2003, 60% of the company's leather was used to make clothes, shoes, and accessories, and 40% for sporting goods such as footballs, basketballs, and baseball gloves.

Horween Leather Company supplies leather shells for footwear to the Timberland Company, Alden Shoe Company (their largest cordovan customer; it became a customer in 1930, buying shell cordovan and other leathers), Cole Haan, Allen Edmonds, Nomad Goods, Brooks Brothers, Hanover Shoe, Chippewa Boots and Johnston & Murphy. Accessories and leather goods customers include J.Crew and Shinola Detroit.

=== Sporting goods ===
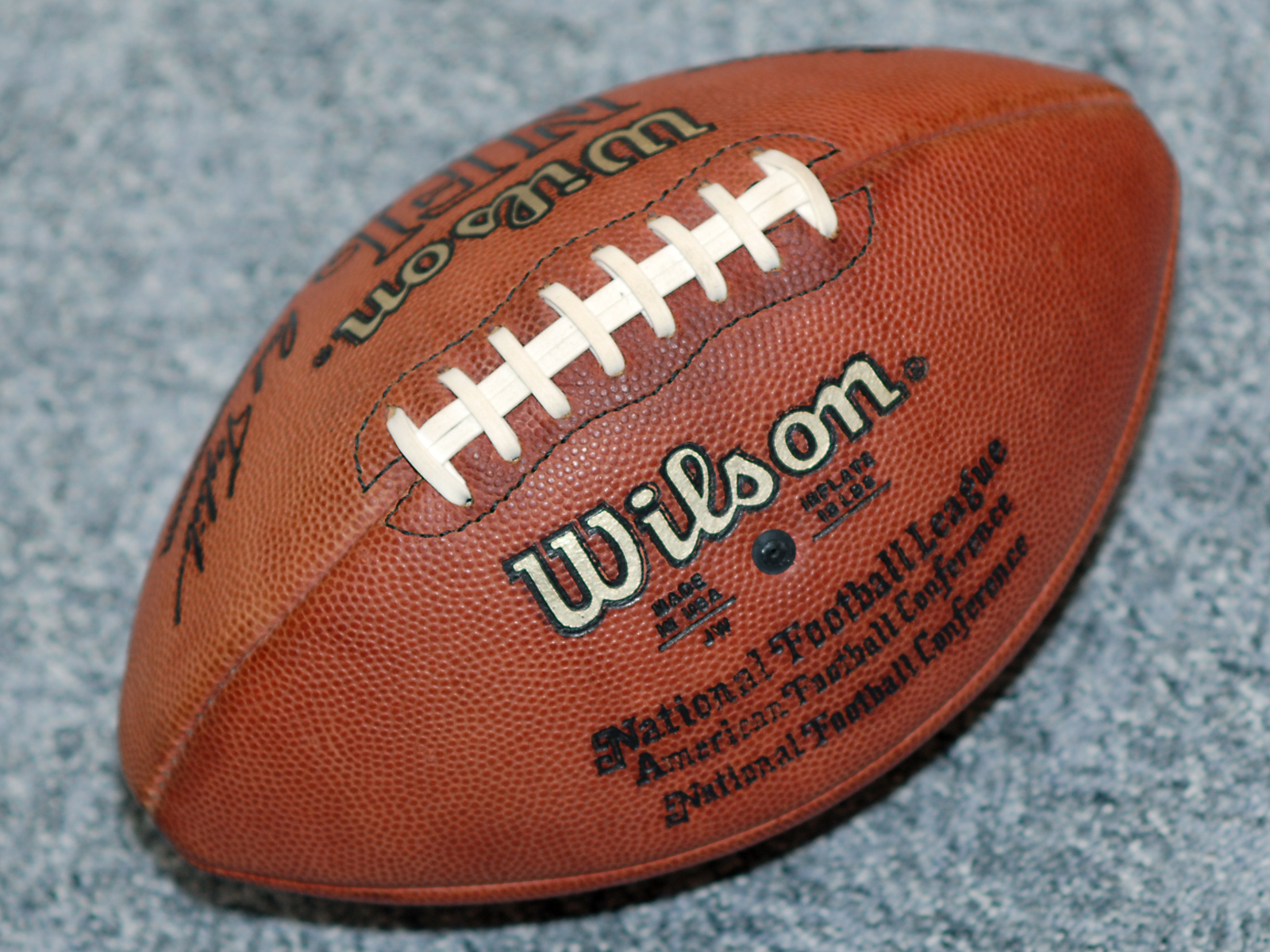
A Wilson modern American football, as used in the National Football League

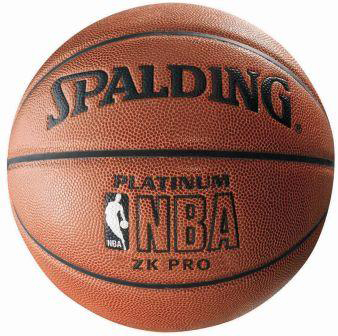
A Spalding basketball, as used in the National Basketball Association

Horween Leather Company has provided Rawlings with leather since 1929. In 2003, Horween was providing leather for 3,000 Rawlings baseball gloves annually, and half of professional baseball players were using baseball gloves made from Horween leather.

Wilson Sporting Goods is Horween Leather Company's largest customer, using the company's leather in manufacturing footballs and basketballs. Horween Leather Company has supplied Wilson with pebbled cowhide since 1941.

Since 1941, Horween Leather Company has been the exclusive supplier of leather for National Football League footballs. The arrangement was established initially by Arnold Horween, who had played and coached in the NFL. The company uses its own "Tanned in Tack" process. Although footballs are often called "pigskins," they are made from Horween Leather Company-supplied steer hides that are embossed with a pebble pattern. The company also supplies the leather for the game balls made for the Canadian Football League, and they also supply leather to Spalding (a division of Russell Corporation) for indoor Arena Football League footballs. Horween Leather Company's leather is also used to make National Basketball Association basketballs, made by Spalding until 2021, and currently by Wilson Sporting Goods.

== Hydrogen sulfide gas release ==
On February 14, 1978, a driver making a delivery to Horween of a tanker truck filled with sodium hydrosulfide ignored signs and approached the wrong storage tank. When the driver was unable at first to connect the tanker's hose to the storage tank, which was designed to prevent accidental mixing, he connected his own homemade coupling and was able to begin delivering the sodium hydrosulfide. The homemade coupling was later impounded by the Chicago Police Department. The tank contained an acid chrome tanning liquor, and the resulting mixture immediately created a large amount of deadly hydrogen sulfide gas. Workers began collapsing as the gas spread through the building. Eight workers died and 35 were injured. The Occupational Safety and Health Administration cited the company for failing to train employees in handling dangerous chemicals or in emergency evacuation procedures.
