= Arnold Horween =

American football player and coach (1898–1985)

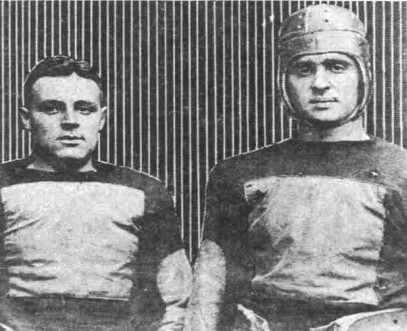
- Arnold Horween (right) with his brother Ralph (left) as members of the Harvard Crimson football team, circa 1919.

Profile
- Positions: Fullback, halfback, quarterback

Personal information
- Born: July 7, 1898; Chicago, Illinois, U.S.
- Died: August 5, 1985 (aged 87); Chicago, Illinois, U.S.
- Listed height: 5 ft 11.5 in (1.82 m)
- Listed weight: 206 lb (93 kg)

Career information
- High school: Francis W. Parker
- College: Harvard

Career history

Playing
- 1921: Racine Cardinals
- 1921–1924: Chicago Cardinals

Coaching
- 1923–1924: Chicago Cardinals
- 1926–1930: Harvard

Awards and highlights
- National champion (1919); Rose Bowl champion (1920); 2× First-team All-American (1919, 1920); First Jewish Harvard football captain
- Coaching profile at Pro Football Reference
- Stats at Pro Football Reference

Other information
- Military career
- Allegiance: United States
- Branch: U.S. Navy
- Service years: 1917–19
- Rank: Lieutenant
- Conflicts: World War I

Arnold Horween (originally Arnold Horwitz; also known as A. McMahon; July 7, 1898 – August 5, 1985) was an American football player and coach. He played and coached both collegiately for Harvard University and professionally in the National Football League (NFL).

Horween played left halfback, right halfback, fullback, and center for the unbeaten Harvard Crimson football teams of 1919, which won the 1920 Rose Bowl, and 1920. He was voted an All-American.

Horween also played four seasons in the NFL, as a fullback, halfback, and blocking back (quarterback) for the Racine Cardinals and the Chicago Cardinals. He was a player-coach for the Cardinals. Later, he was Harvard's head football coach, from 1925 to 1930.

His brother Ralph Horween was also an All-American football player for Harvard, and also played and coached in the NFL for the Cardinals. They were the last Jewish brothers to play in the NFL until Geoff Schwartz and Mitchell Schwartz, in the 2000s. After retiring from football, Horween and his brother inherited and ran the family leather tannery business, Horween Leather Company.

== Early and personal life ==
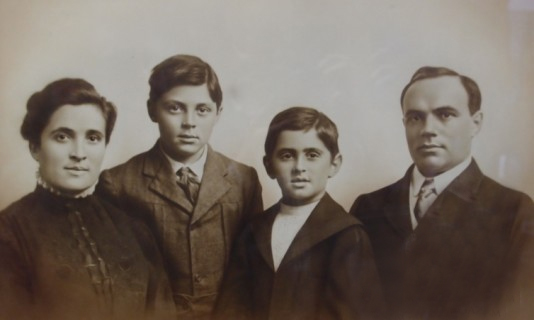
Rose Horween, Ralph Horween, Arnold Horween, and Isidore Horween

Horween's parents, Isidore and Rose (Rabinoff), immigrated to Chicago from Ukraine in the Russian Empire in 1892. During his youth the family changed its name to Horween from its original name, which was either Horwitz or Horowitz.

Horween was Jewish, and was born in Chicago, Illinois. He was the brother of Ralph Horween, who was two years older. They were the last Jewish brothers to play in the NFL until offensive tackles Geoff Schwartz and Mitchell Schwartz in the 2000s.

He played high school football at center and fullback for four years at Francis W. Parker School. He was captain of the football team in his senior year.

Horween was 5 ft 11.5 in (1.816 m), and weighed 206 pounds (93 kg). In 1928, he married Marion Eisendrath, daughter of leather tycoon William Eisendrath.

== College and Navy career ==
Horween followed his older brother to Harvard University, where they played together on the Harvard Crimson football team, in 1916. In his freshman year, he played both football (as a fullback) and baseball (as a pitcher), and was a member of the track team as a shotputter.

The next year, he enlisted in the United States Navy during World War I, in April 1917. He was promoted to ensign in October 1917, eventually reaching the rank of lieutenant. He served on a destroyer in the Atlantic and was discharged in 1919, when he returned to Harvard.

Horween played left halfback, right halfback, fullback, and center for the Harvard Crimson, and was a First-team All-American, from 1919 to 1920. In both 1919 and 1920 Harvard was undefeated (9–0–1 and 8–0–1, respectively). In 1919, Donald Grant Herring ranked him the Second-team fullback on the Princeton-Yale-Harvard composite team.

Horween was unanimously elected the Harvard Crimson's first Jewish captain in 1920. That year, he kicked a 42-yard (38 m) field goal against Yale in a 9–0 victory, and a 37-yard (34 m) field goal against the Centre Colonels. He was part of the unbeaten 1919 team that won the 1920 Rose Bowl against the Oregon, 7–6, as he kicked the extra point that decided the game, and Harvard relied in part on his running game. It remains the only bowl game appearance in Harvard history.

The New York Times wrote: "The way he smashed through the line was considerable... there were even some protests that this dark-haired, sturdily built Crimson fullback was a little too rough."

In 1920 he was chosen Walter Camp third-team All-American and selected by a number of newspapers to the All-America first-team. He graduated from Harvard in 1921.

== NFL career ==
Horween played fullback, tailback, and blocking back (quarterback) in the National Football League for four years, in 32 games, for the Racine Cardinals (in the American Professional Football Association, the predecessor to the NFL) in 1921 and the Chicago Cardinals (as the Cardinals changed their name) from 1922 to 1924. He was a player–coach for the Cardinals from 1923 to 1924.

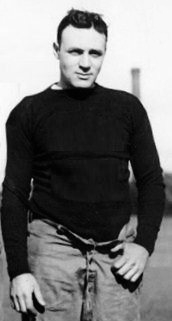
Arnold's brother Ralph Horween, alongside whom he played football at Harvard and in the NFL

In 1922–23, Horween appeared in all 11 games and scored 4 rushing touchdowns as the Cardinals were 8–3–0. In 1923–24, the team was 8–4–0. On October 7, 1923, he and his brother both scored in the same game, as he kicked two extra points and his brother ran for a touchdown as the Cardinals beat the Rochester Jeffersons 60–0 at Normal Park in Chicago. On November 12, 1922, he made a long pass to Paddy Driscoll for the game's only touchdown, in a 7–0 victory over the Akron Pros. On December 2, 1923, he kicked a 35-yard (32 m) field goal and his brother ran for a touchdown as the Cardinals beat the Oorang Indians, 22–19.

His brother Ralph Horween also played for the Chicago Cardinals. Horween and his brother played for the Cardinals under the alias McMahon (he played as A. McMahon) to protect their family's social status. He kept that name until 1923.

== Coaching career at Harvard ==
Horween returned to Harvard as the school's head football coach from 1925 to 1930, compiling a record of 21–17–3. The New York Sun reported:

The boys are for him unreservedly. It is no, secret, however, that Horween's appointment didn't please the Beacon Street–Park Avenue element among the grads. The clique that supported the old regime would prefer to see a Cabot or a Wendell, we use the names as symbols, in the saddle...

Charlie Devens, who later played baseball for the New York Yankees, played football under Horween at Harvard. He recalled that anti-Semitic posters aimed at Coach Horween were displayed at a game in Ann Arbor, Michigan.

Horween married Marion Eisendrath in November 1928. The couple had a long engagement, as they had agreed to postpone the wedding until the Harvard football team defeated Yale. The requisite victory took place on Saturday, November 24, and the wedding on the following Thursday. He resigned following the 1930 season.

== Horween Leather Company ==
After retiring from football, Horween returned to Chicago in 1930, and he and his brother inherited the family leather tannery business, Horween Leather Company, which had been founded by their father in Chicago in 1905. He operated the business, a successful company that supplied (and still supplies) the leather for Wilson's NFL official football, from 1949 to 1984.

In 1945, he coached the football team of his former high school, Francis Parker.

In 1952, he was vice president of the Chicago Symphony Orchestra. He also served as a trustee of the Chicago Symphony, and on the Harvard University board of overseers.

== Head coaching record ==
=== College ===
Year	Team	Overall	Conference	Standing	Bowl/playoffs
Harvard Crimson (Independent) (1926–1930)
1926	Harvard	3–5			
1927	Harvard	4–4			
1928	Harvard	5–2–1			
1929	Harvard	5–2–1			
1930	Harvard	3–4–1			
Harvard:		20–17–3			
Total:		20–17–3			

== See also ==
- List of select Jewish football players
