= Flexure (disambiguation) =

Flexure may refer to:

- Flexure, a flexible element (or combination of elements) engineered to be compliant in specific degrees of freedom.
- Bending, the behavior of a structural element subjected to a lateral load
- Flexure bearing, a type of flexure designed to be compliant in a bending or rotation degree of freedom, providing functionality similar to a bearing or hinge
- The small distortion of an astronomical instrument caused by the weight of its parts; the amount to be added or subtracted from the observed readings of the instrument to correct them for this distortion
- Curvature, the deviation from straightness
- Flexure (embryology) an early bending of the neural tube

== See also ==
- Living hinge
- Bend (disambiguation)
- Flexion (disambiguation)
