= Kyocera K011 =

Mobile phone

K011 / K011 Z (KY011 / KY011 Z)
- Brand: au
- Manufacturer: Kyocera
- Type: Feature phone
- First released: June 27, 2012; 14 years ago (K011); July 2012 (K011 Z)
- Discontinued: January 2014 (Hokuriku region); March 31, 2022 (3G service termination)
- Predecessor: K009 (KY009)
- Successor: MARVERA (MARVERA KYY08)
- Compatible networks: 3G: CDMA 1X (CDMA2000 1xMC); 2G: GSM
- Form factor: Waterproof clamshell
- Colors: Elegant Pink; Premium Black (includes K011 Z); Pearl White
- Dimensions: 112 mm (4.4 in) H 49 mm (1.9 in) W 15.3 mm (0.60 in) D (thickest part approx. 17.0 mm)
- Weight: 136 g (4.8 oz)
- Operating system: KCP3.2 (Brew MP)
- System-on-chip: Qualcomm Snapdragon S1 (QSD8650)
- CPU: 1 GHz
- Memory: 800 MB (Data folder)
- Removable storage: microSD (up to 2GB, KDDI official) microSDHC (up to 32GB, KDDI official)
- Battery: Continuous talk time: 220 minutes (domestic use); Continuous standby time: 350 hours (domestic use)
- Rear camera: Approx. 8.08 MP CMOS with image stabilization and AF (None for K011 Z)
- Front camera: None
- Display: Main: 3.2-inch Wide VGA+ (480×854 dots) TFT LCD, 260,000 colors Sub: 0.9-inch Organic EL, monochrome (1 color)
- Water resistance: IPX5/IPX7 waterproof
- Model: KY011 / KY011 Z
- Made in: Japan

The Kyocera K011 and K011 Z are clamshell / flip phones compatible with CDMA 1X WIN (now au 3G), developed and manufactured by Kyocera for KDDI and Okinawa Cellular Telephone under the au brand. The manufacturing model numbers are KY011 for the K011 and KY011 Z for the K011 Z.

== History ==
On May 15, 2012, KDDI and Kyocera officially announced the devices. The handset passed the Federal Communications Commission (FCC) on June 14, 2012. Pre-sales began on June 27, 2012, in the Tohoku, Chubu, Chugoku, Shikoku, and Kyushu regions, followed by releases in remaining regions on June 28, 2012. The camera-less model, K011 Z, was released in July 2012. Sales in the Hokuriku region ended in January 2014. On April 30, 2016, the "LISMO Book Store" service was terminated due to a decrease in users resulting from the spread of smartphones and tablets, though downloaded content remained accessible after termination. On March 31, 2018, various services such as EZ apps and Global Passport (excluding GSM) were terminated. Finally, on March 31, 2022, the device became unusable due to the termination and shutdown of 3G services.

== Specifications ==
The device runs on the KCP3.2 platform (Brew MP) and is powered by a Qualcomm Snapdragon S1 (QSD8650) CPU clocked at 1 GHz. It supports 3G CDMA 1X (CDMA2000 1xMC) and 2G GSM networks, along with WIN HIGH SPEED (CDMA2000 1xEV-DO MC-Rev.A) data communication. The body features a waterproof clamshell design measuring 112 mm in height, 49 mm in width, and 15.3 mm in thickness (with the thickest part being approximately 17.0 mm), weighing approximately 136 g. It comes in three colors: Elegant Pink, Premium Black (which includes the K011 Z model), and Pearl White. The display setup consists of a 3.2-inch Wide VGA+ (480x854 pixels) TFT LCD main screen supporting 260,000 colors, and a 0.9-inch monochrome Organic EL sub-screen. For imaging, the standard K011 is equipped with an approximately 8.08-megapixel CMOS rear camera featuring image stabilization and autofocus, while the K011 Z model omits the camera.

Battery performance provides approximately 220 minutes of continuous talk time and 350 hours of continuous standby time in domestic use. Storage and memory options include an 800 MB data folder, support for microSD memory cards up to 2 GB, and microSDHC memory cards up to 32 GB as officially announced by KDDI. Additional hardware features include FeliCa, infrared communication (IrDA), Bluetooth, a One-Seg digital TV tuner, hardened glass on the liquid crystal panel, and IPX5/IPX7 water resistance, with a SAR value of 0.212 W/kg at the side of the head. Software and services supported include ATOK for au + APOT Japanese input, mamorino navigation, self-menu, dictionary functions, close-to-lock, blind screen privacy filter, incoming call display settings, slow/clear voice modes, large text, quick text, bilingual functions, blog upload and Twitter posting functions (excluding K011 Z), shopping search, photo book (excluding K011 Z), voice recorder, LISMO services (including Chuta Full, Chuta Full Plus, LISMO Video which ended on March 31, 2013, and LISMO Book), EZ Keitai Arrange, barcode reader/maker, PC Site Viewer, au BOX, wireless music, EZ Naviwalk, EZ Assistant Navi, Disaster Navigation, Nakachen, EZ App, PC Document Viewer, multi-play windows, Jibun Bank app, EZ News Flash, EZ News EX, EZ FeliCa, Keitai de PC Mail, Decoration Mail/Animation, au one Mail, Emergency Earthquake Warnings, Emergency Location Notification, Global Passport, and au Femtocell.
