= Docomo STYLE series N-01C =

Clamshell phone manufactured by NEC Casio

NEC docomo STYLE series N-01C
- Brand: NTT Docomo
- Manufacturer: NEC Casio Mobile Communications
- First released: November 12, 2010; 15 years ago
- Compatible networks: 3G: FOMA (W-CDMA); 2G: GSM
- Form factor: Clamshell
- Colors: Kisskiss Pink; Charcoal; White; Lavender
- Dimensions: 49 mm (1.9 in) W 108 mm (4.3 in) H 12.9 mm (0.51 in) D (max. approx. 15.5 mm)
- Weight: 108 g (3.8 oz)
- Operating system: Access Linux Platform + OPP (L)
- CPU: OMAP 3430
- Removable storage: microSD (up to 2 GB) microSDHC (up to 16 GB)
- Rear camera: 8.1 megapixels CMOS, 28 mm wide-angle lens (f/2.8), autofocus, HD video recording, LED flash, image stabilization, face recognition
- Front camera: 330,000 pixels CMOS
- Display: Main: 3.2 inches, 480 x 854 pixels (Full Wide VGA), TFT LCD, 16,777,216 colors Sub: 0.8 inches, 96 x 35 pixels, Organic EL, 1 color

The docomo STYLE series N-01C is a 3G FOMA clamshell mobile phone manufactured and developed by NEC Casio Mobile Communications for NTT Docomo. It is part of the docomo STYLE series.

The phone, alongside 17 phone models, was announced by NTT Docomo on November 8, 2010 and was released 4 days later.

== Specifications ==
=== Display ===
It has a main VGA TFT display sizing at 3.2 inches with a resolution of 480 x 854 pixels wide and 16,777,216 colors produced. It also has a secondary OLED display with a size of 0.8 inches and a resolution of 96 x 35 pixels.

A distinctive feature is the "W Aurora Illumination", which emits light on both the back and the key surface.

=== Camera ===
It has a resolution of 8.1 megapixels, which utilizes Sony's "Exmor for mobile". Furthermore, it includes NEC's "PictMagic IV" image stabilization with a startup time of 0.5 seconds, an interval of 0.6 seconds and a startup up to 1.1 seconds.
