= Flexure bearing =

Type of mechanical bearing

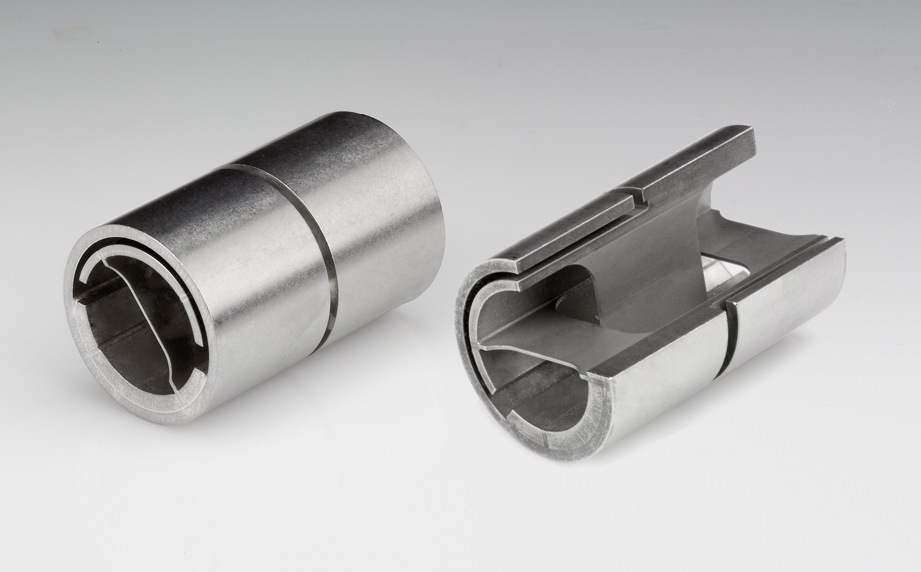
A flexure pivot, utilized in place of bearings for their frictionless properties in precision alignment mechanisms and scientific instruments

A flexure bearing is a category of flexure which is engineered to be compliant in one or more angular degrees of freedom. Flexure bearings are often part of compliant mechanisms. Flexure bearings serve much of the same function as conventional bearings or hinges in applications which require angular compliance. However, flexures require no lubrication and exhibit very low or no friction.

Many flexure bearings are made of a single part: two rigid structures joined by a thin "hinge" area. A hinged door can be created by implementing a flexible element between a door and the door frame, such that the flexible element bends allowing the door to pivot open.

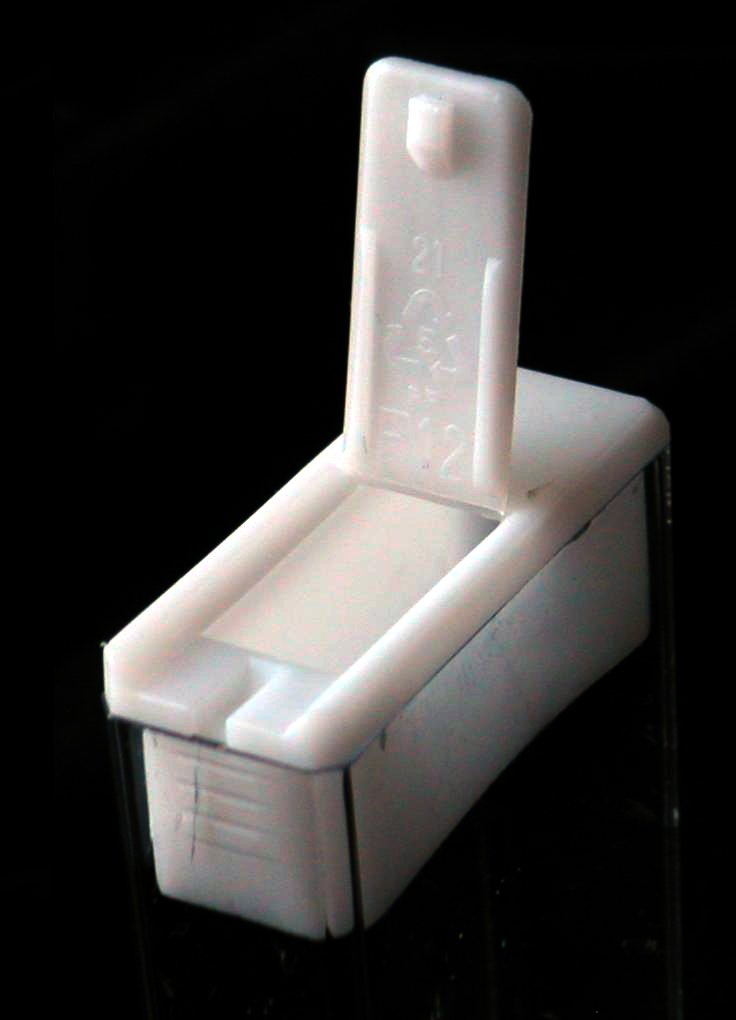
A living hinge (a type of flexure) on the lid of a Tic Tac box. This hinge has one compliant degree of freedom.

Flexure bearings have the advantage over most other bearings that they are simple and thus inexpensive. They are also often compact, lightweight, have very low friction, and are easier to repair without specialized equipment. Flexure bearings have the disadvantages that the range of motion is limited, and often very limited for bearings that support high loads.

A flexure bearing relies on the bearing element being made of a material which can be repeatedly flexed without disintegrating. However, most materials lose strength and eventually fail with repeated flexing and bending. For example, most metals will fatigue with repeated flexing, and will eventually snap. Thus, one part of flexure bearing design is the careful consideration of material properties to avoid fatigue with normal use.

Flexure bearings can give very low friction and also give very predictable friction. Many other bearings rely on sliding or rolling motions (rolling-element bearings), which are necessarily uneven because the bearing surfaces are never perfectly flat. A flexure bearing operates by bending of materials, which causes motion at microscopic level, so friction is very uniform. For this reason, flexure bearings are often used in sensitive precision measuring equipment.

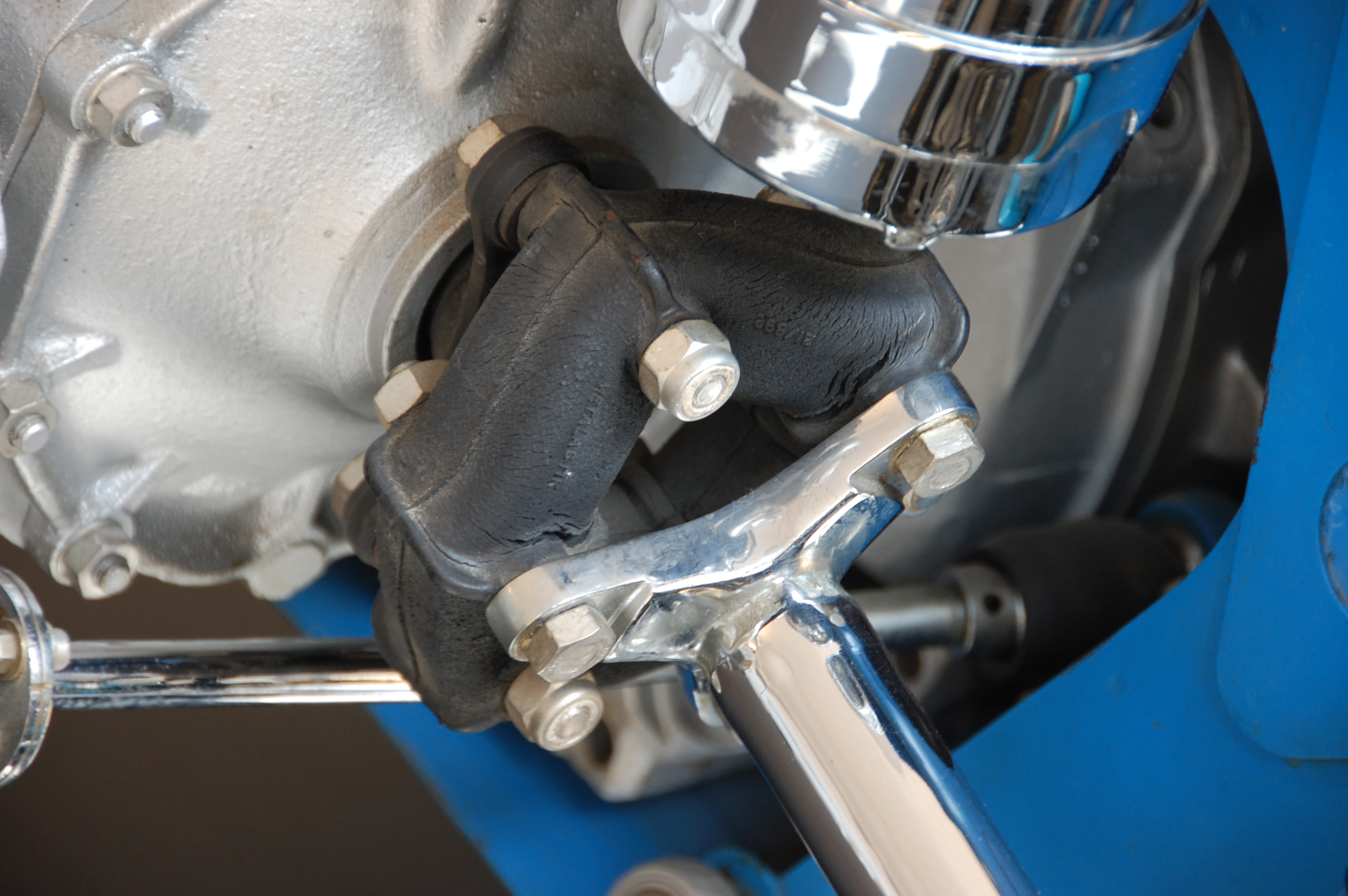
A giubo driveshaft coupling, another type of flexure bearing, on the right hand rear driveshaft of a formula 2 race car. This coupling has two compliant degrees of freedom to allow rotation of the shaft with some misalignment.

Many types of flexure bearings are not limited to low loads, however. For example, the drive shafts of some sports cars replace cardan universal joints with an equivalent joint called a rag joint which works by bending rubberized fabric. The resulting joint is lighter yet is capable of carrying hundreds of kilowatts, with adequate durability for a sports car.

Because flexure bearings do not rely on sliding or rolling motions, they do not require lubrication. Consequently, they can be employed in abrasive environments and environments hostile to lubricants: underwater, in a vacuum and at elevated temperatures.

== See also ==
- Precision engineering
- Rolamite
- Spring (device)
