= Rag joint =

Type of flexible coupling

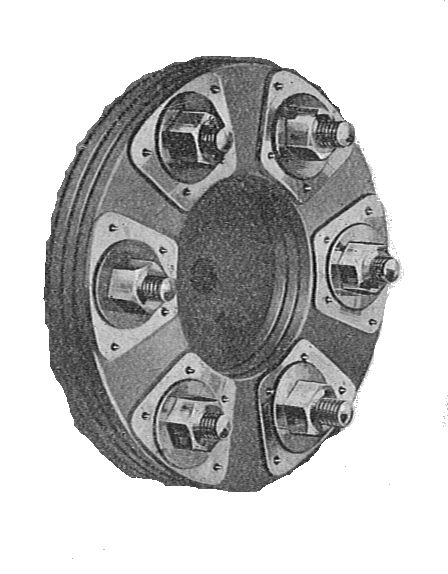
Rag joint, circa 1919

A rag joint refers to certain flexible joints (flexure bearings) found on automobiles and other machines. They are typically found on steering column shafts that connect the steering wheel to the steering gear input shaft, usually at the steering gear end. They provide a small amount of flex for a steering shaft within a few degrees of the same plane as the steering gear input shaft. It also provides some damping of vibration coming from the steering system, providing some isolation for the steering wheel.

This type of joint has also been used on drive shafts. Farm tractors and lawn and garden equipment have often used them in this application, and even some higher-power applications, such as some 1960s race cars, featured them. In automobile and truck prop shaft designs, they have now mostly been replaced by constant-velocity joints or driveshafts with pairs of universal joints or giubos. Rear-wheel drive cars have commonly used a lengthwise propeller shaft with a rubber doughnut joint at the gearbox end (limited movement) and a universal joint at the rear axle (greater movement), or vice versa. This gives articulation where needed, but also stops some of the vibration being transmitted into the body.

The joint consists of one or more doughnut-shaped layers of flat rubber sheet with reinforcing cords vulcanized in them, similar to a tire. In fact, they are cut from used tires. This disc is bolted or riveted to flanges mounted on the ends of the shafts to connect the steering wheel shaft to the steering gear. The ragged cords can be seen on the edge of this piece of rubber, hence the term "rag joint". The bolt holes themselves are often reinforced by steel tubes moulded into the doughnut.

The origins of this form of universal joint are from early vehicles that used a disk of thick leather as a similar flexible joint. These were used into the 1920s. As rubber technology improved (particularly for its resistance to spilled mineral oils), it was possible to replace leather by longer-lasting materials. "Rag joints" were used on some American cars, including GM full size sedans, into the mid 90s.

An older vehicle with loose steering or "play in the steering wheel" is often found to have a worn rag joint. One can reach inside the cab and wiggle the steering wheel while watching the rag joint move without the input shaft moving. This condition may cause the vehicle to fail the vehicle inspection, indicating that the worn part needs replacement.
