= Clamshell design =

Form factor

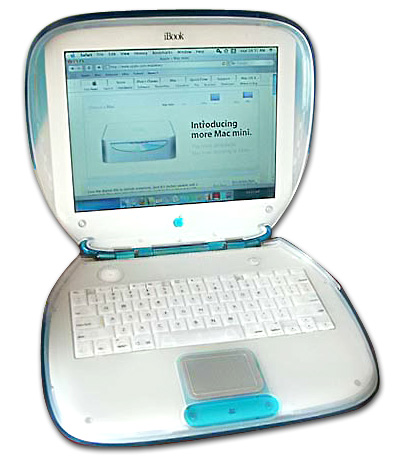
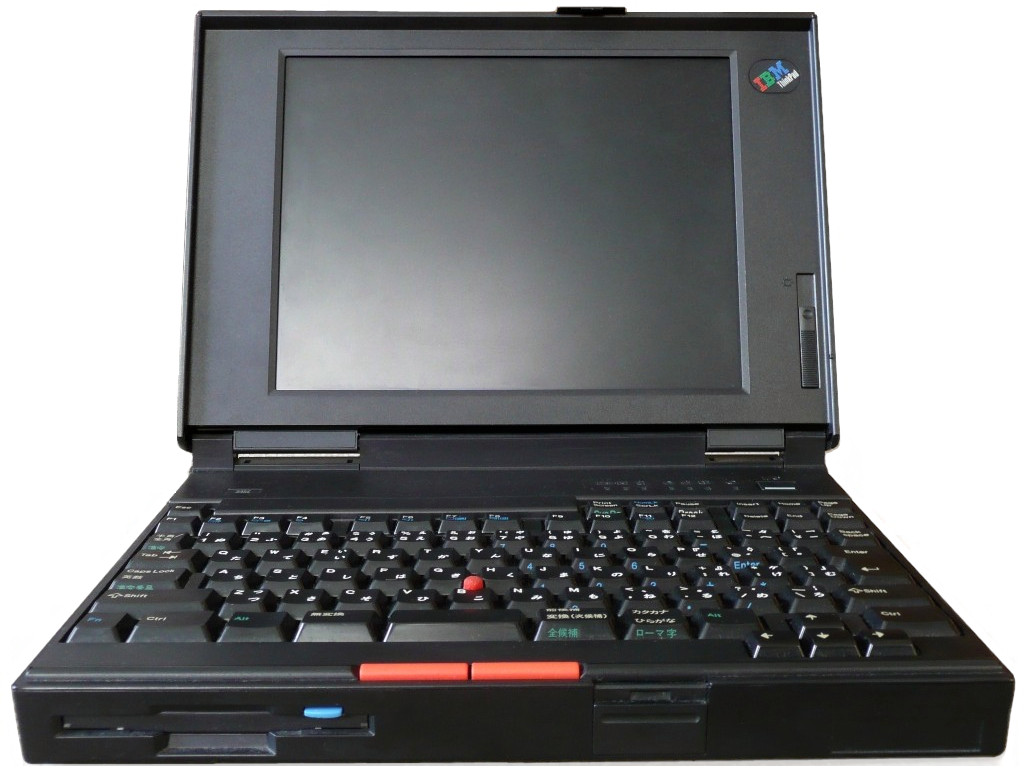
Two schools of clamshell design: bio-design influenced Apple iBook (1999) and Bento box-like IBM ThinkPad model 345C (1992)

Clamshell design is a form factor commonly used in the design of electronic devices and other manufactured objects. It is inspired by the morphology of the clam. The form factor has been applied to handheld game consoles, mobile phones (where it is often called a "flip phone"), and especially laptop computers. Clamshell devices are usually made of two sections connected by a hinge, each section containing either a flat panel display or an alphanumeric keyboard/keypad, which can fold into contact together like a bivalve shell.

Generally speaking, the interface components such as keys and display are kept inside the closed clamshell, protecting them from damage and unintentional use while also making the device shorter or narrower so it is easier to carry around. In many cases, opening the clamshell offers more surface area than when the device is closed, allowing interface components to be larger and easier to use than on devices which do not flip open. A disadvantage of the clamshell design is the connecting hinge, which is prone to fatigue or failure.

The clamshell design is most popularly recognized in the context of mobile cellular phones. The term flip phone is used more frequently than "clamshell" in colloquial speech, especially when referring to a phone where the hinge is on the short edge – if the hinge is on a long edge, more akin to a laptop (e.g., Nokia Communicators), the device is more likely to be called just a "clamshell" rather than a flip phone. In the 1990s and early 2000s, what is now called "flip" phones were more commonly known as "folder" or "folding" phones, whereas "flip phone" referred to a now obsolete form factor most notably seen on the Motorola MicroTAC. Motorola itself held the "Flip Phone" trademark until 2005.

== Early examples in tech ==
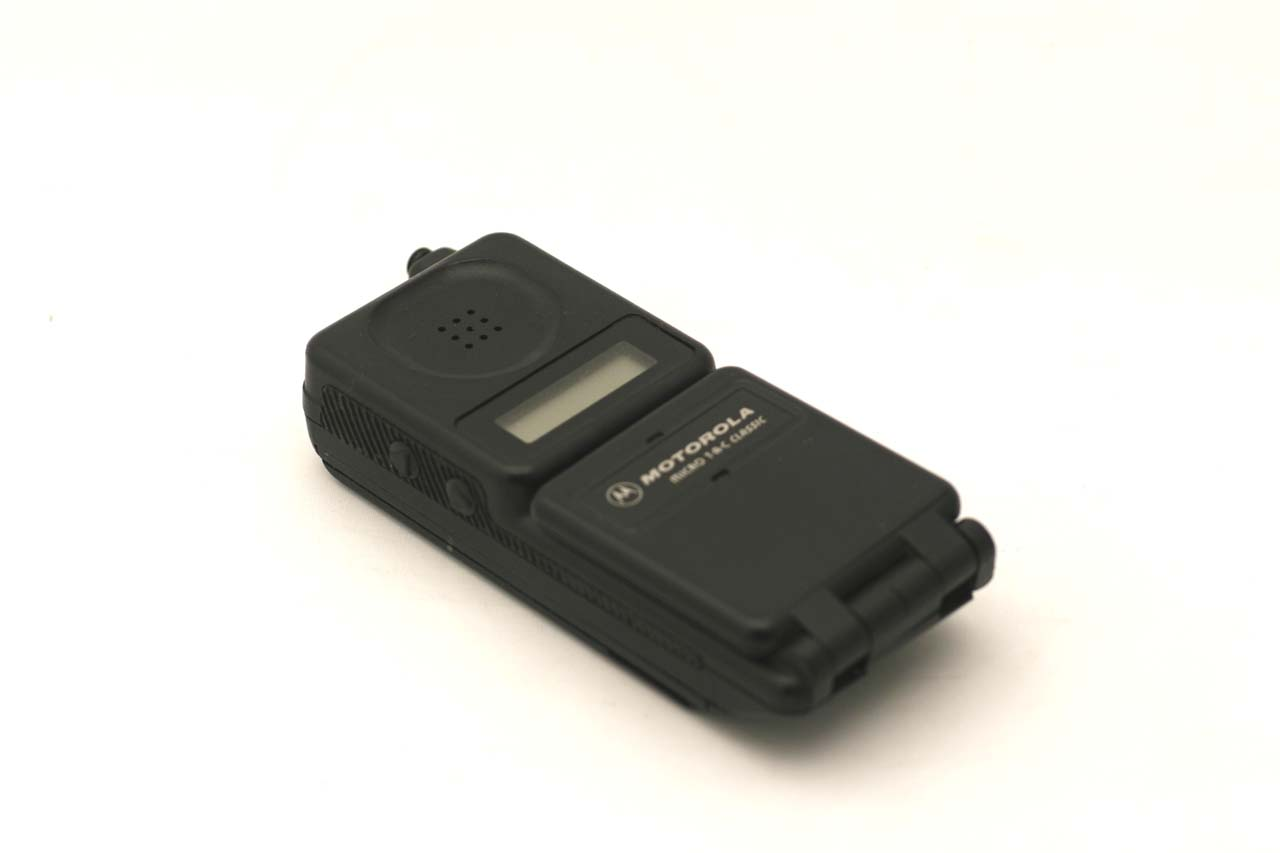
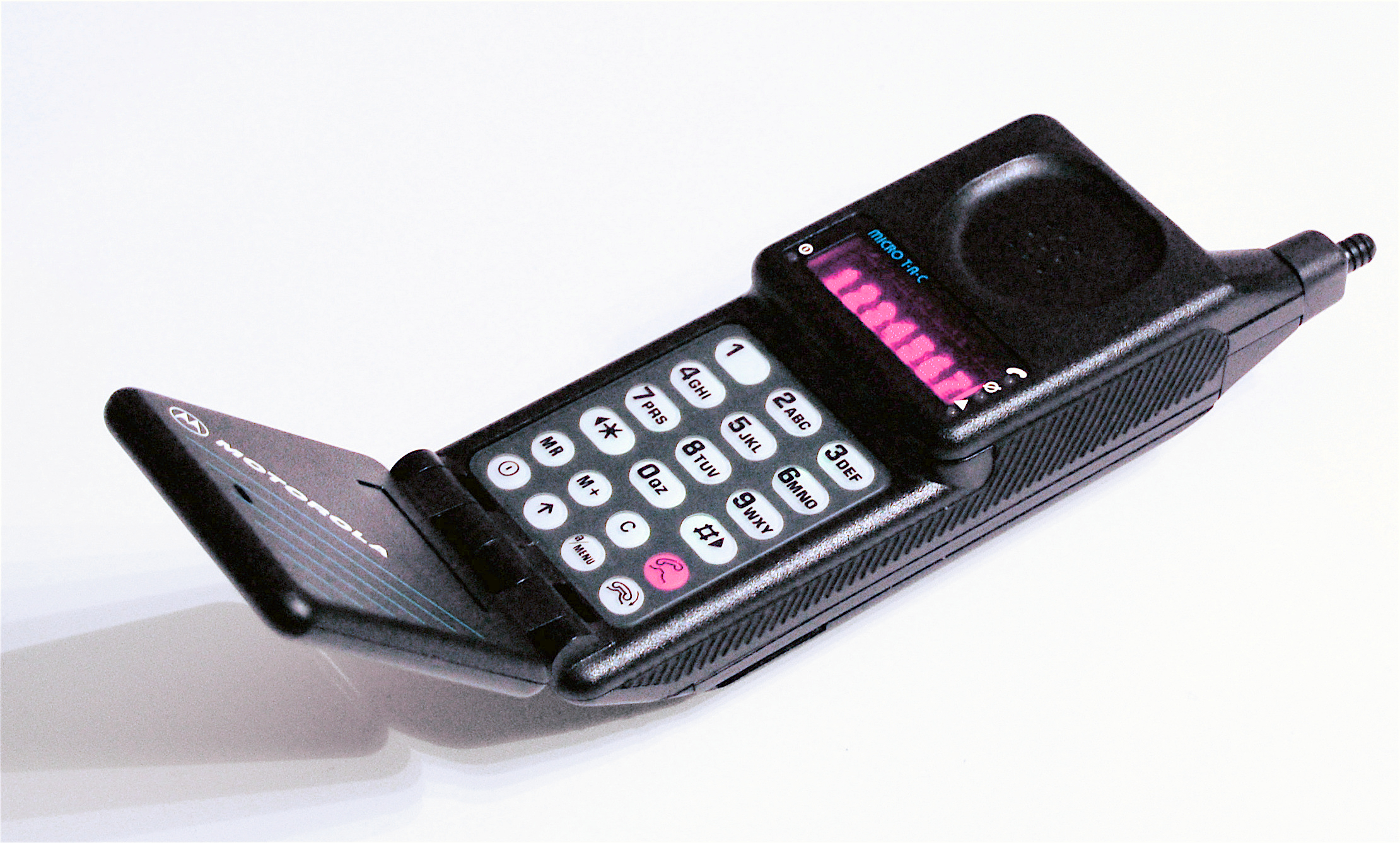
The Motorola MicroTAC was one of the first hinged mobile phones (1989).

A "flip phone" like communication device appears in chapter 3 of Armageddon 2419 A.D., a science fiction novella by Philip Francis Nowlan, which was first published in the August 1928 issue of the pulp magazine Amazing Stories: "Alan took a compact packet about six inches square from a holster attached to her belt and handed it to Wilma. So far as I could see, it had no special receiver for the ear. Wilma merely threw back a lid, as though she was opening a book, and began to talk. The voice that came back from the machine was as audible as her own." Also from science fiction, Star Trek: The Original Series featured a regular plot device called the "Communicator" which influenced the development of early clamshell mobile phones such as the Motorola MicroTAC and StarTAC. The acronym "TAC" is an abbreviation of "Total Area Coverage" and was first used for the Motorola DynaTAC.

Early examples of the form factor's use in electronics include the 1963 Brionvega Brionvega TS 502 portable radio, the Grillo telephone, which first appeared in Italy in the mid 1960s, and the Soundbook portable radio cassette player, which was introduced in 1974 (the designer Richard Sapper was responsible for all three of these, and was subsequently involved in the design of IBM computers). The form factor was first used for a portable computer in 1982 by the laptop manufacturer GRiD (who had the patents on the idea at the time) for their Compass model. In 1985, the Ampere WS-1 laptop used a modern clamshell design.

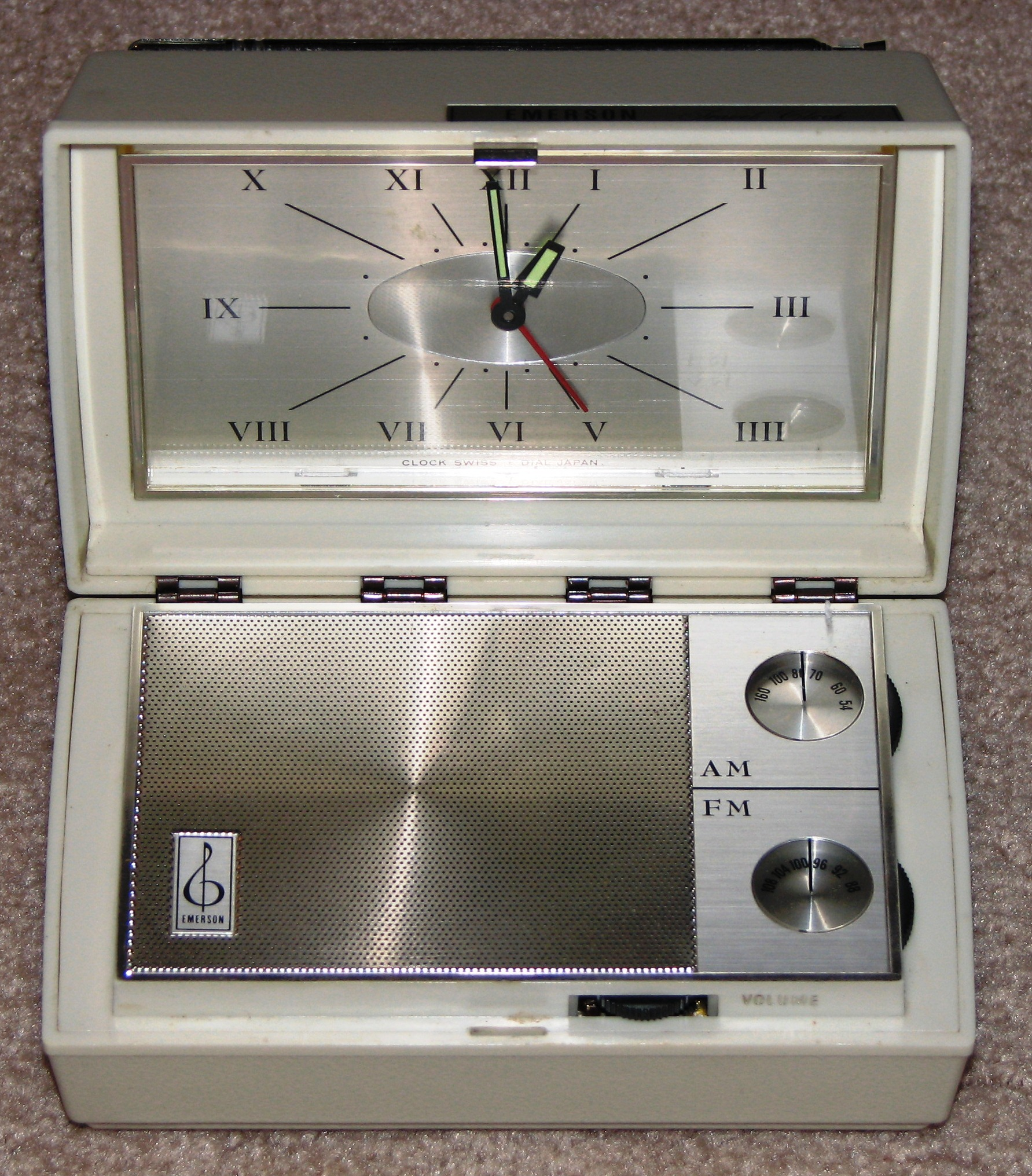
Emerson Cordless Travel Clock Radio (model 31P70), Japan (1960s)

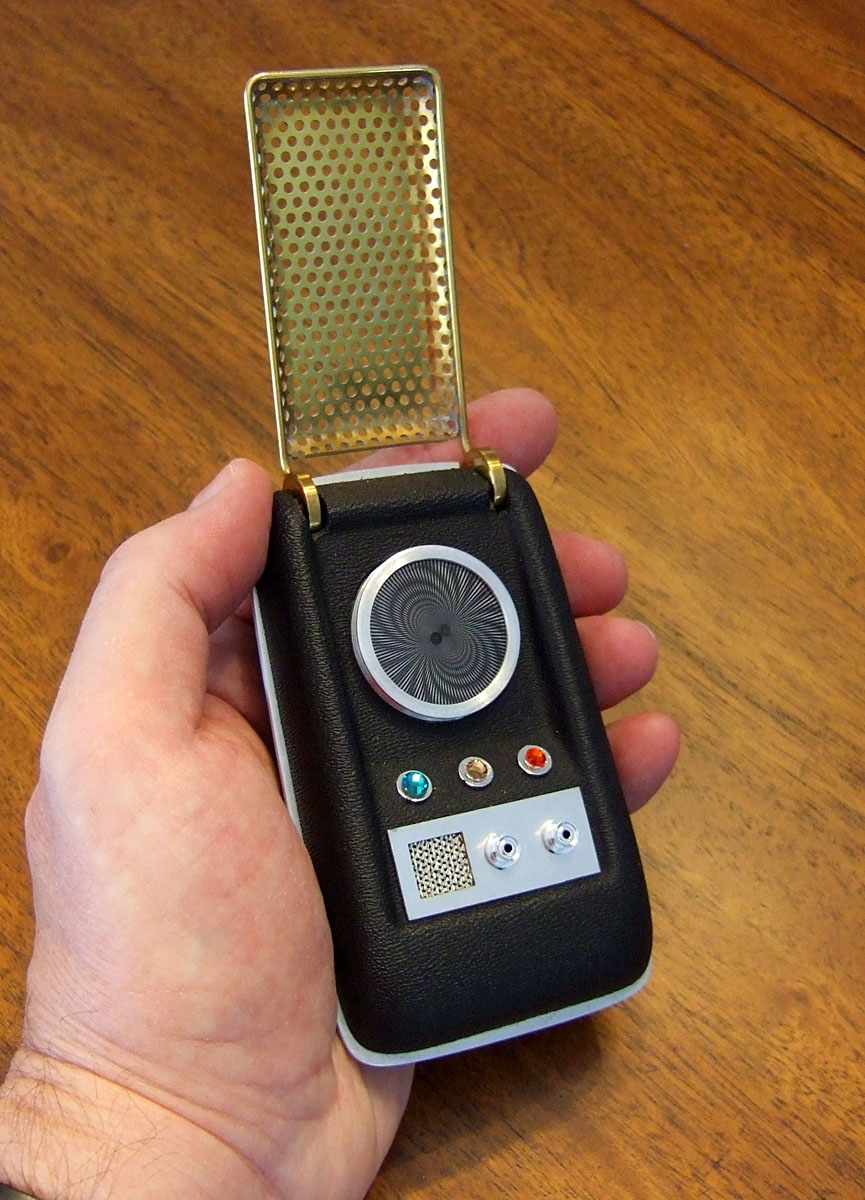
StarTrek Communicator (replica of late 1960s design)

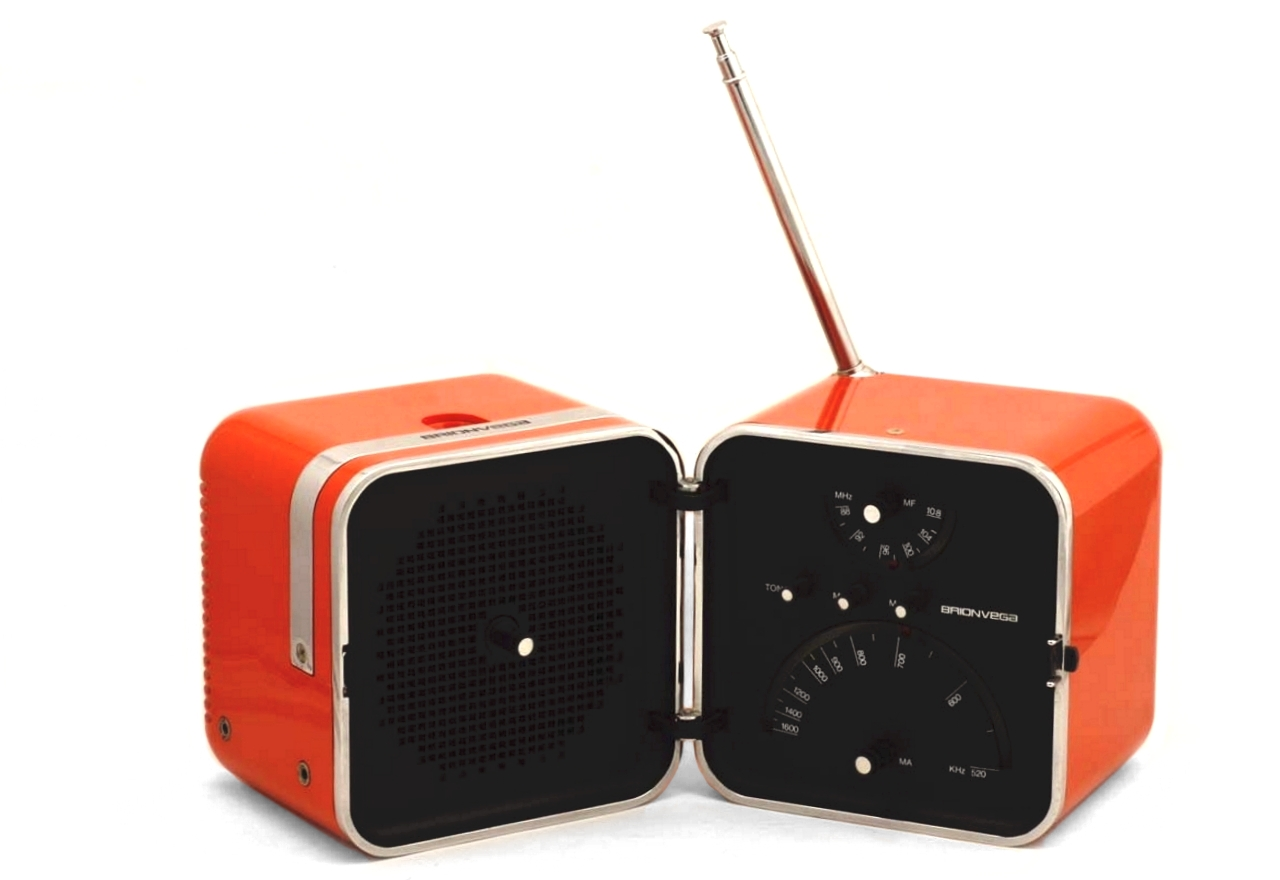
Brionvega TS 502 radio, Museum of science and technology, Milan (1963)

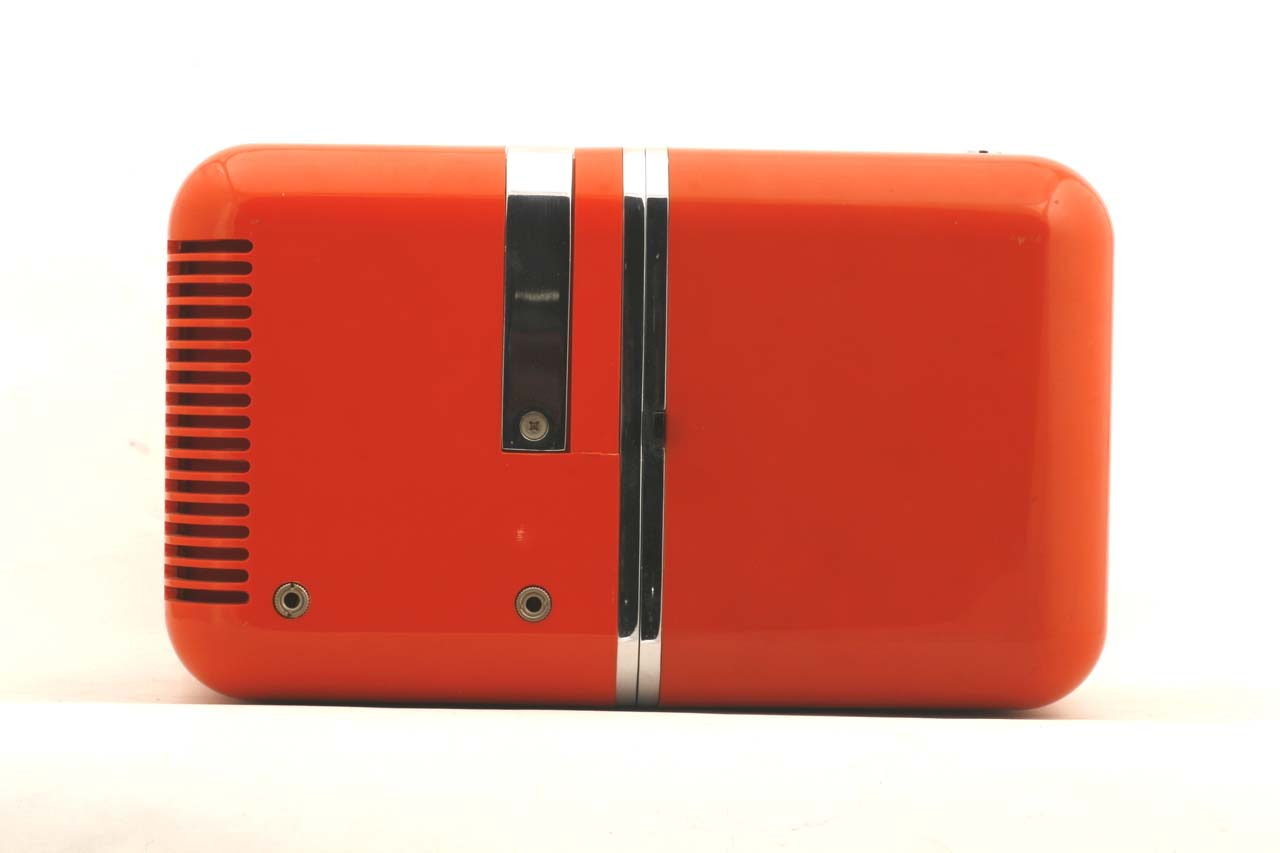
Brionvega TS 502 (closed)

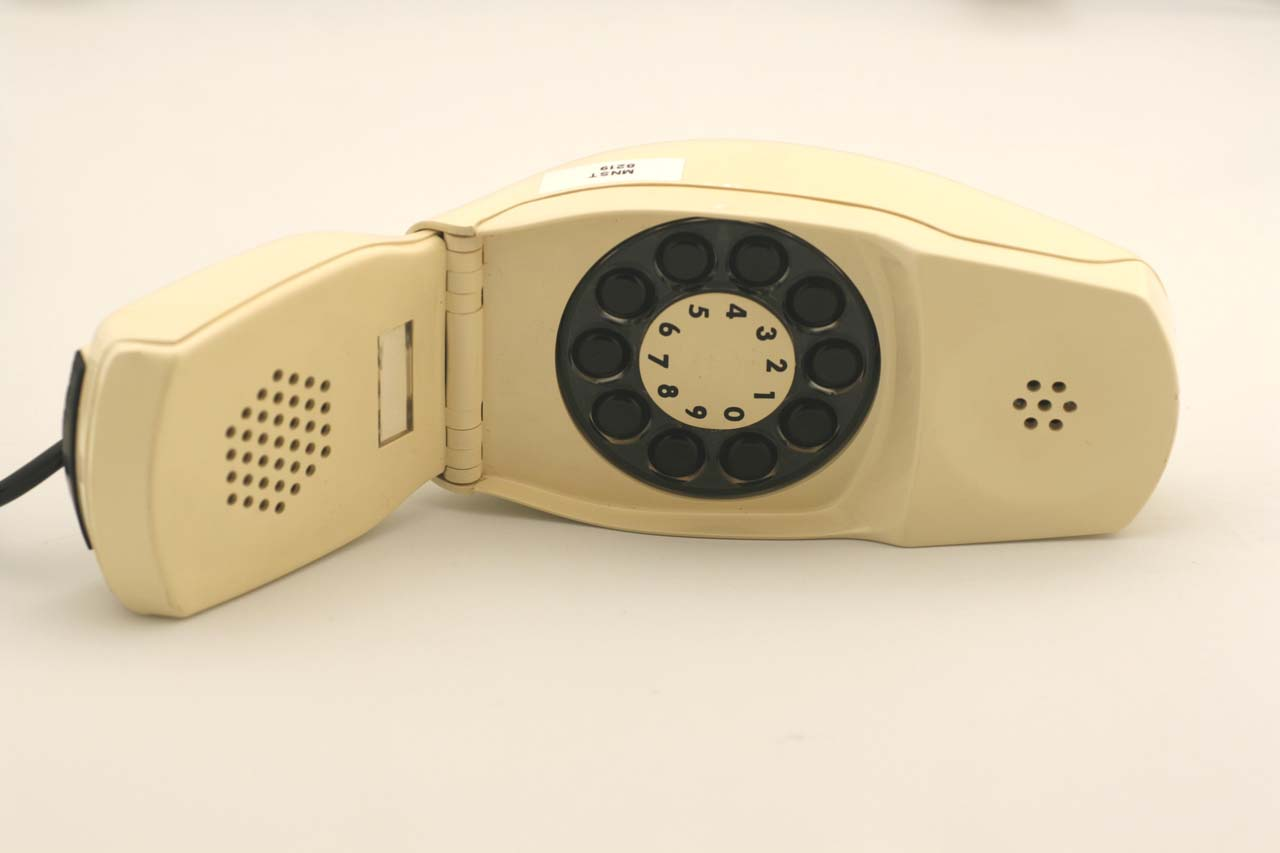
Grillo telephone, Museum of science and technology, Milan (1965)

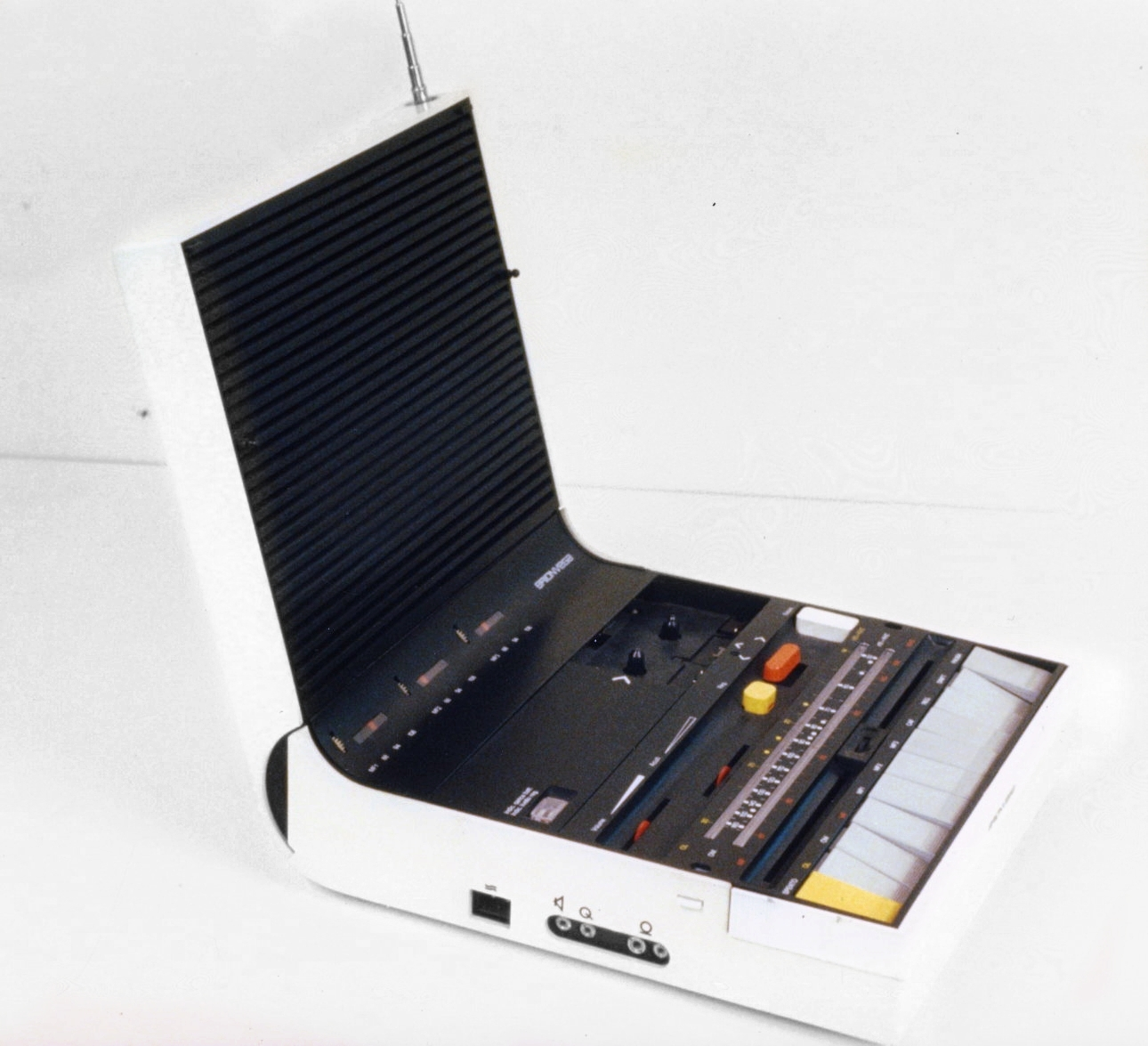
Brionvega Soundbook portable radio cassette player, Museum of science and technology, Milan (1974)

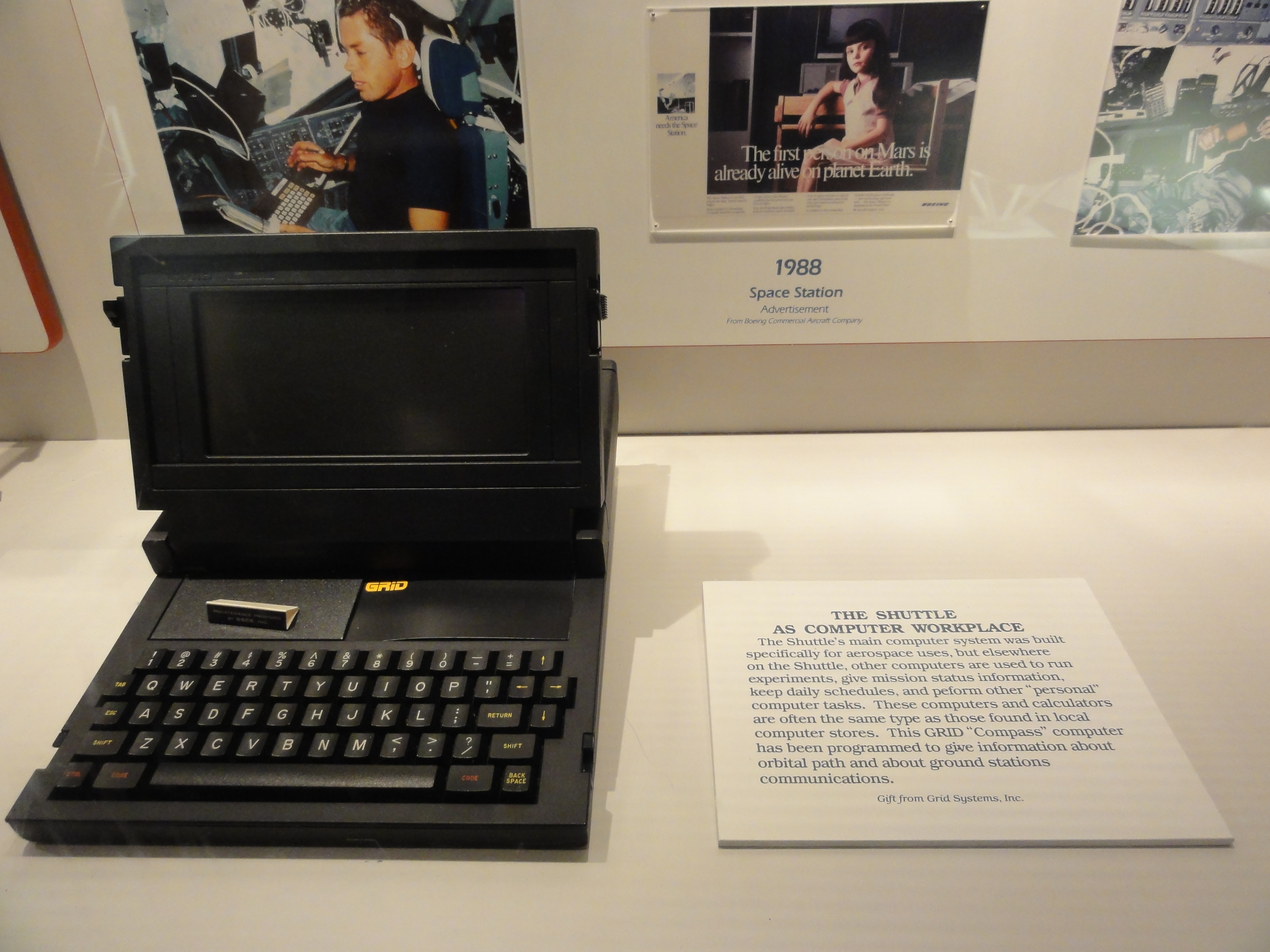
GRiD Compass, National Air and Space Museum (1982)

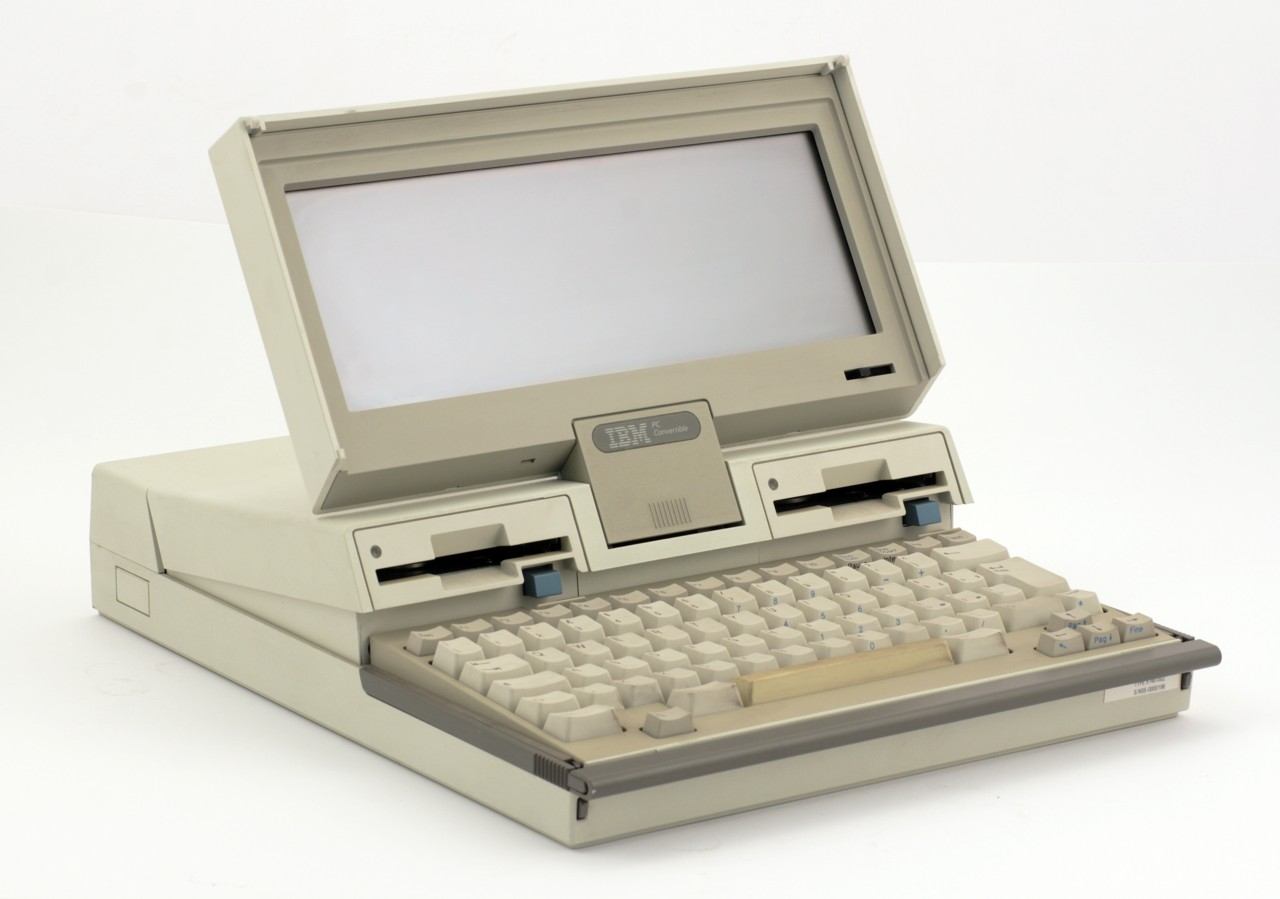
IBM PC Convertible (model 5140) Museum of science and technology, Milan (1986)

== Automotive ==
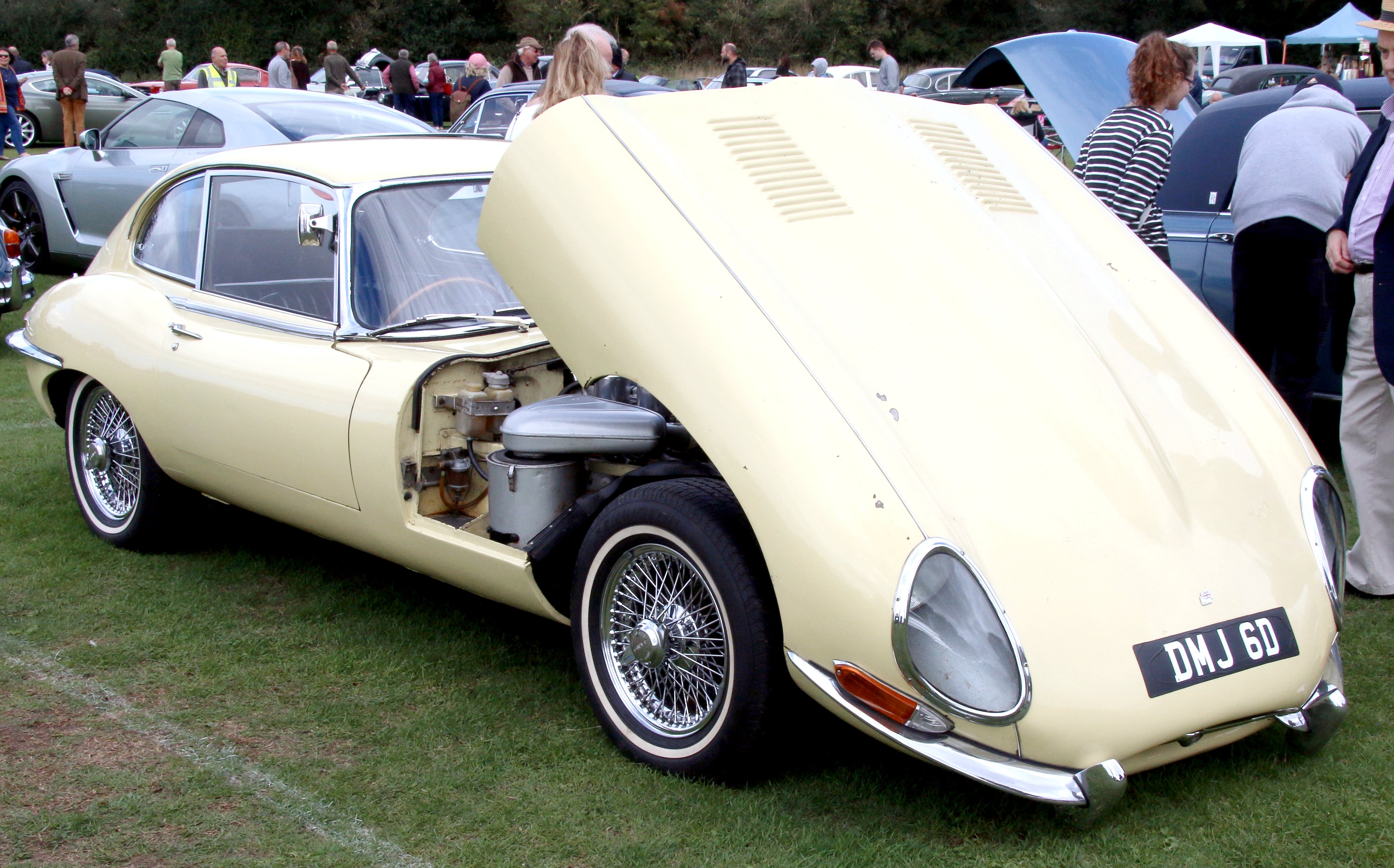
Clamshell bonnet of a Jaguar E-Type (1966)

In automotive design, a clamshell bonnet or clamshell hood is a design where the engine cover also incorporates all or part of one of the wings (fenders). It is sometimes found in a car with a separate chassis such as a Triumph Herald or in cars based on a spaceframe where the bodywork is lightweight and carries no significant loading, such as the Ford GT40 and Ferrari Enzo, where the whole rear end can be lifted to access the engine compartment and suspension system. It is also sometimes seen in unibody cars, albeit much more rarely – such as the BMW Minis and Alfa Romeo GTV.

It is also an informal name for General Motors full-size station wagons, manufactured from 1971 to 1976, that featured a complex, two-piece "disappearing" tailgate, officially known as the "Glide Away" tailgate.

== Other uses ==
In addition to mobile phones; laptop computers and subnotebooks; handheld game consoles such as the Game Boy Advance SP, Nintendo DS, and Nintendo 3DS (though these are less frequently described as "flip" or "clamshell"); objects such as pocket watches, egg cartons, certain types of luggage, waffle irons, sandwich toasters, krumkake irons, certain types of heavy machinery, and the George Foreman Grill are all examples a clamshell design.

Bookbinders build archival clamshell boxes called Solander cases, in which valuable books or loose papers can be protected from light and dust.

The clamshell form factor is also commonly used in product packaging.

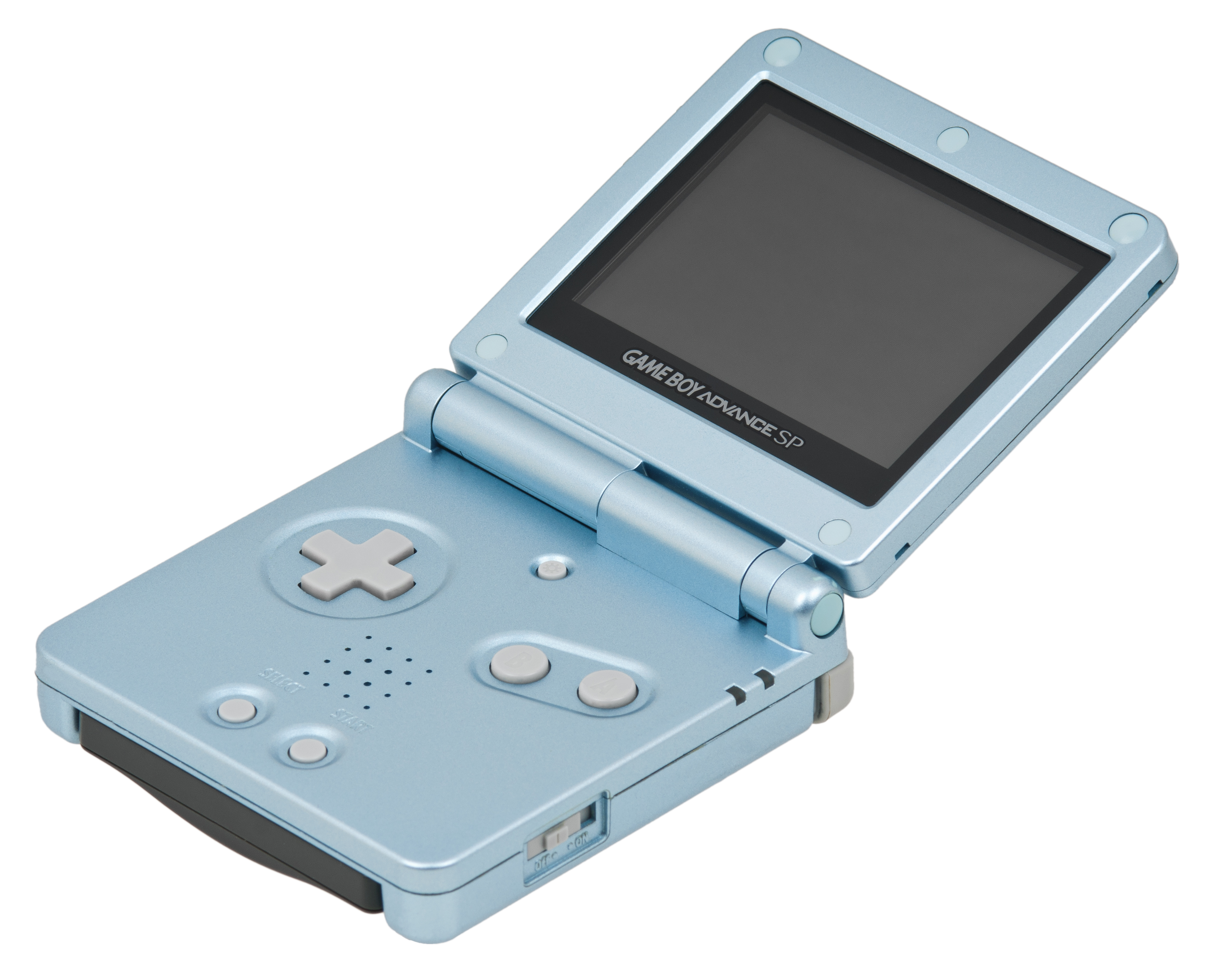
Nintendo Game Boy Advance SP (2003)

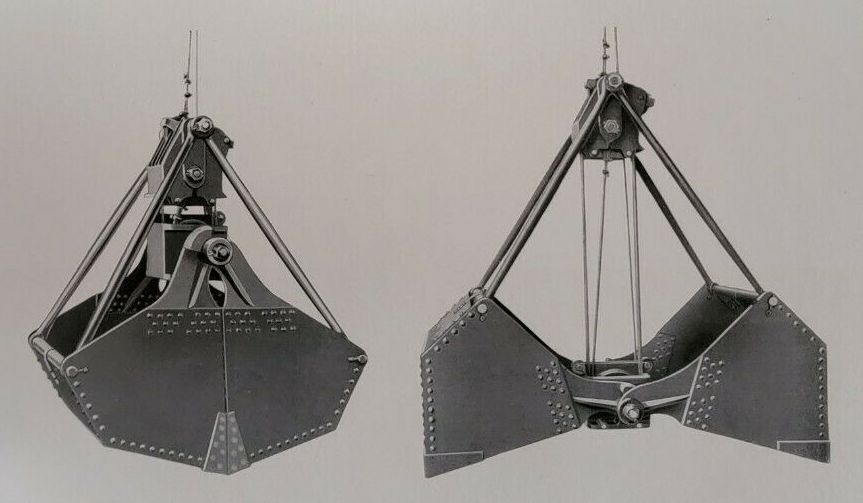
Clamshell grab bucket (c. 1914)

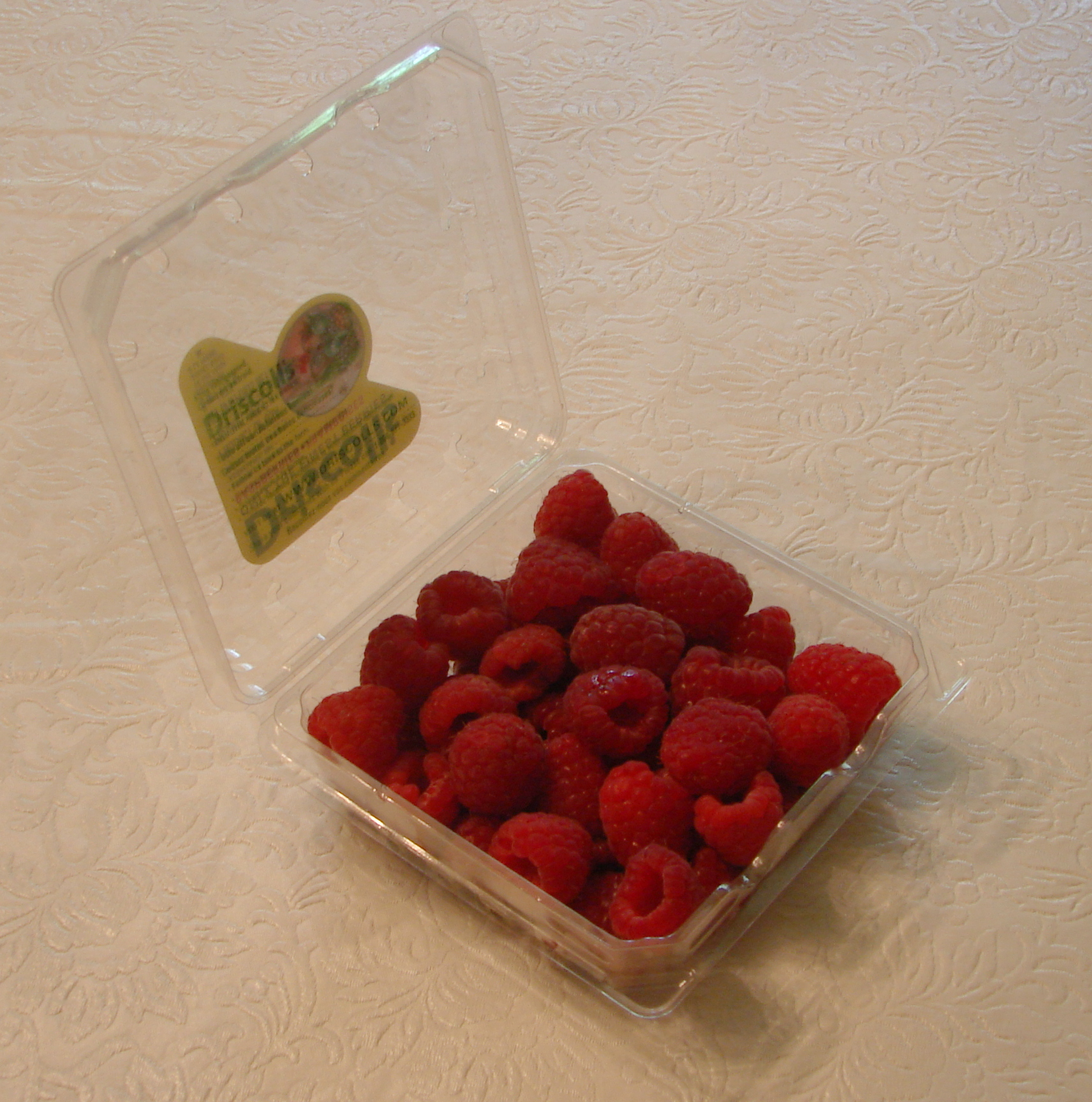
Plastic clamshell packaging

== See also ==
- Dual-touchscreen
- Foldable smartphone
- Laptop
- Living hinge
