= Slipcase =

Five-sided box for protecting books

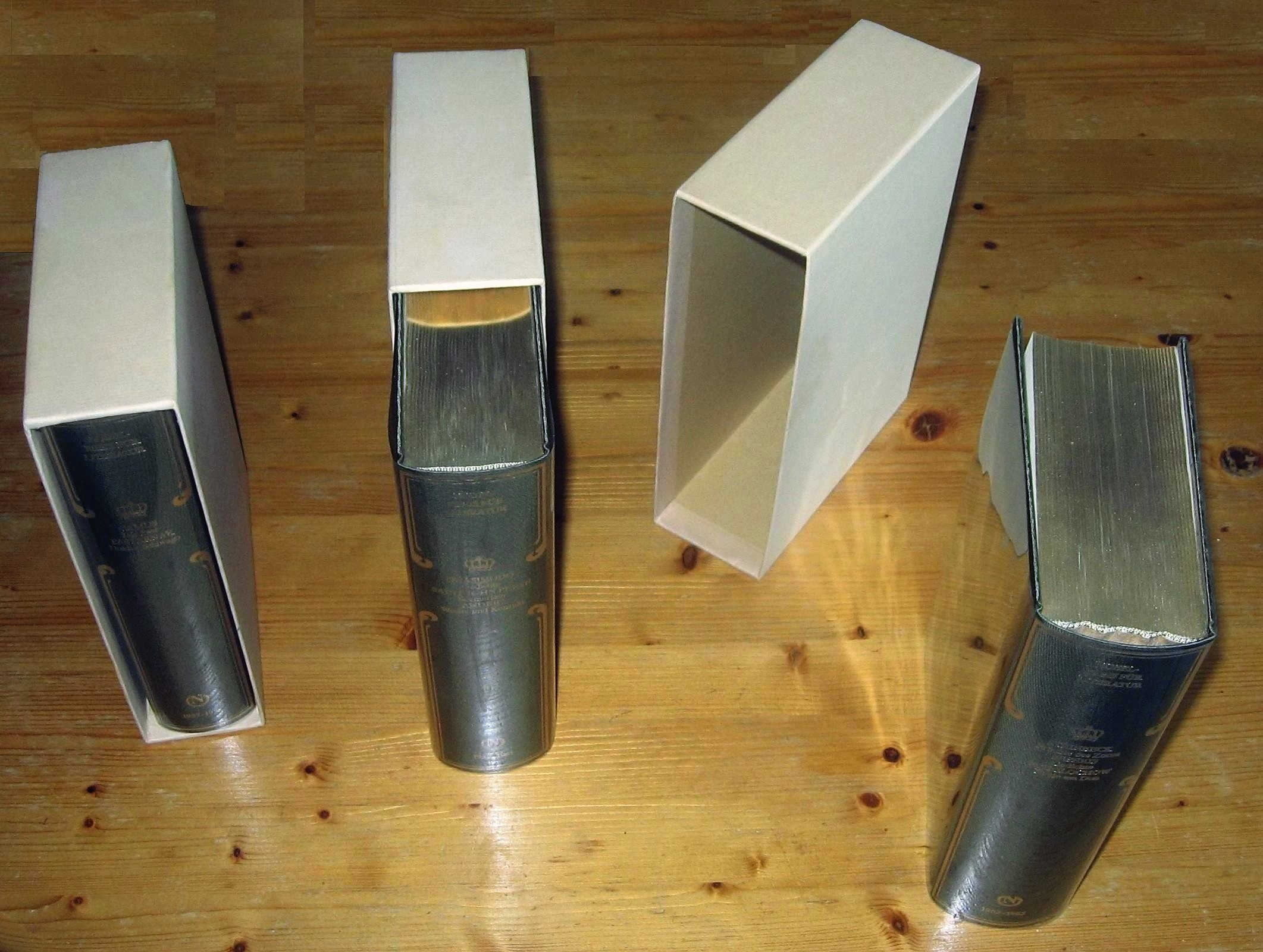
Books and slipcases

A slipcase is a five-sided box, usually made of high-quality cardboard, into which binders, books or book sets are slipped for protection, leaving the spine exposed. Special editions of books are often slipcased for a stylish appearance when placed on a bookshelf. A few publishers, such as the Folio Society, publish nearly all their books in slipcases.

Protective slipcases have been issued for records, cassettes, 8-track tapes, film, video cassettes, compact discs, DVDs and even toys instead of or in addition to the more common jewel cases or keep case, and may be chosen for aesthetic or economic reasons. Larger slipcases that are designed to house one or more items are often used in packaging for special edition releases or box sets.

== See also ==
- Solander box
