= Clamshell (container) =

Type of consumer product packaging

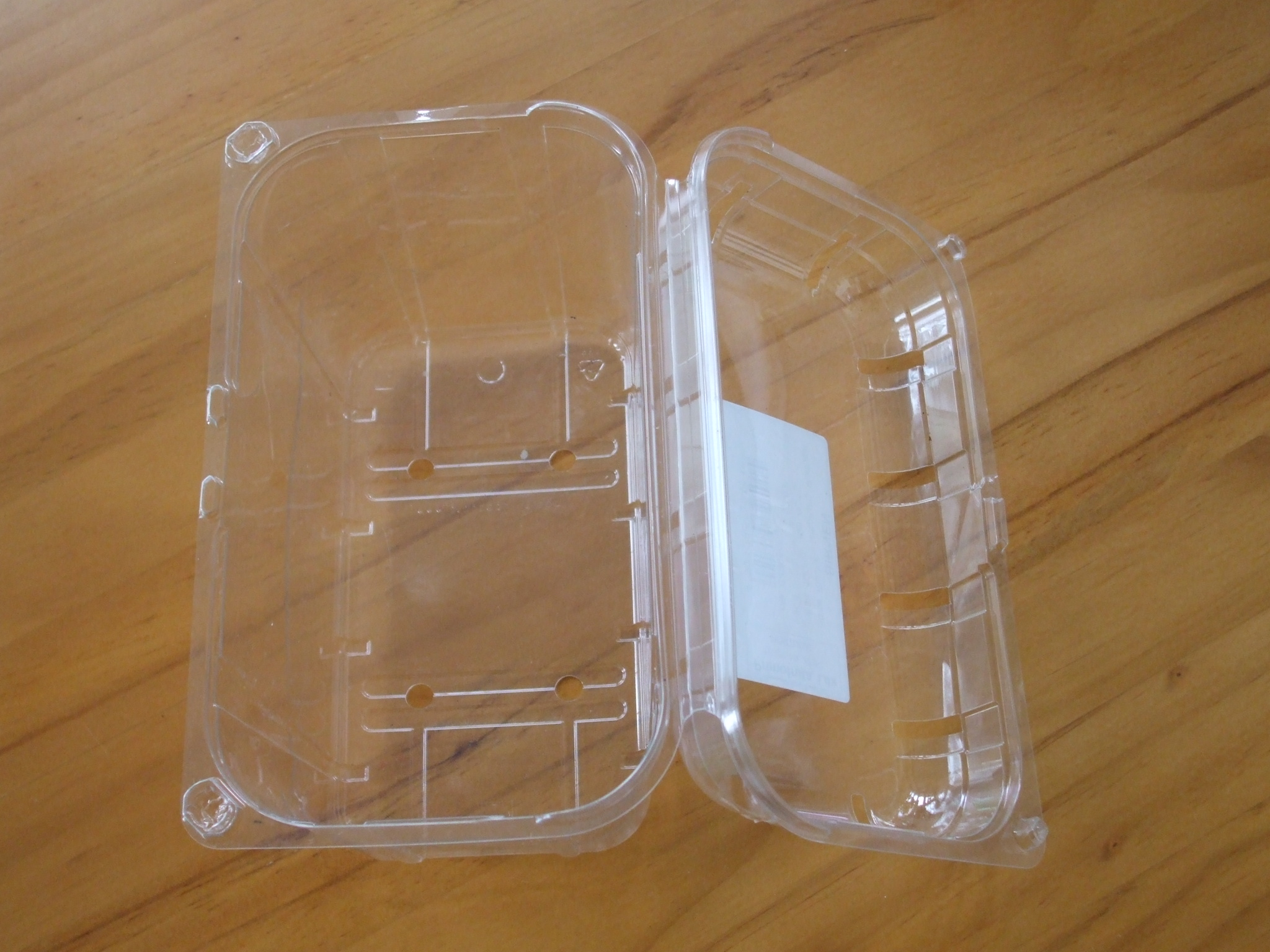
Empty clamshell package

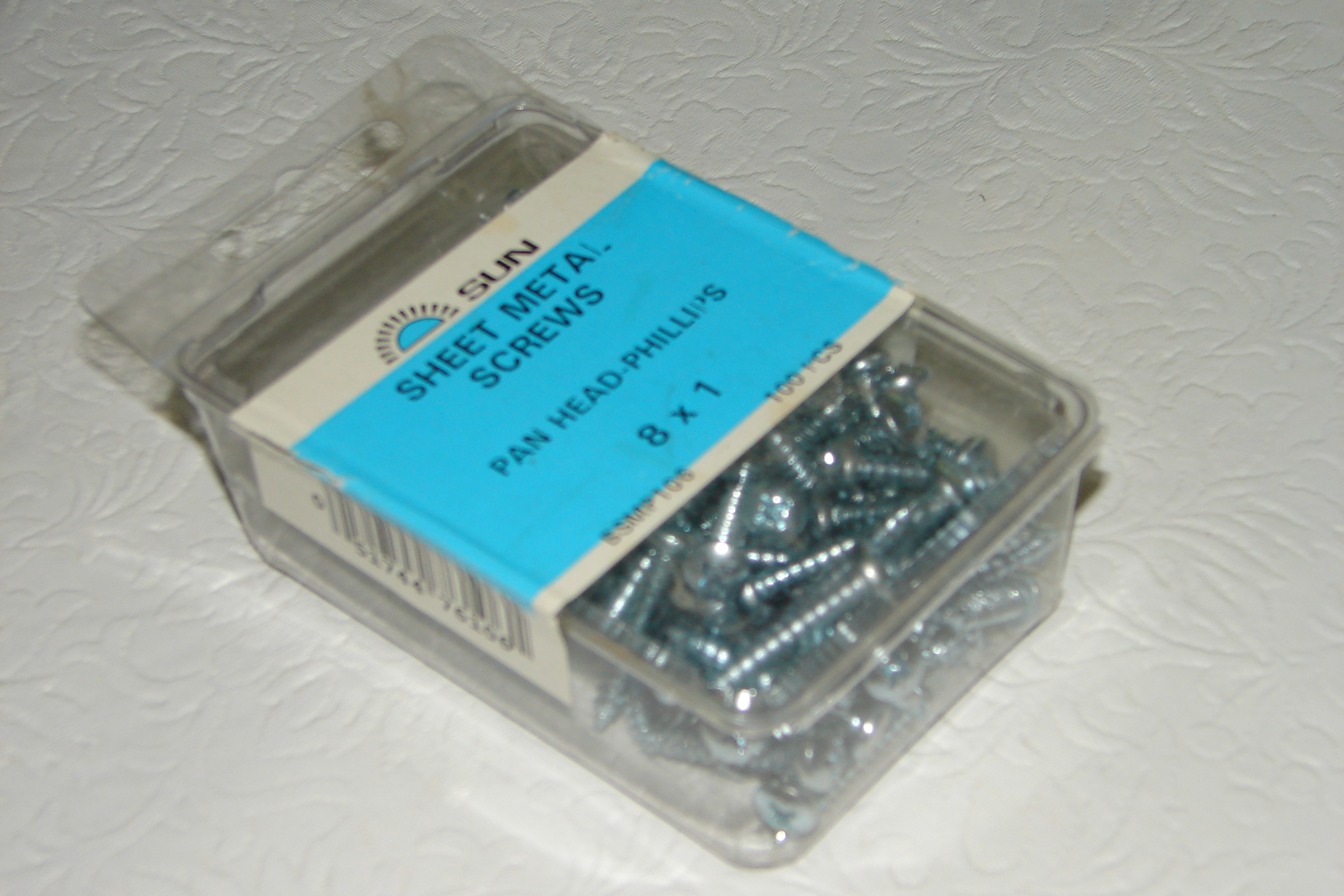
Clamshell pack of screws

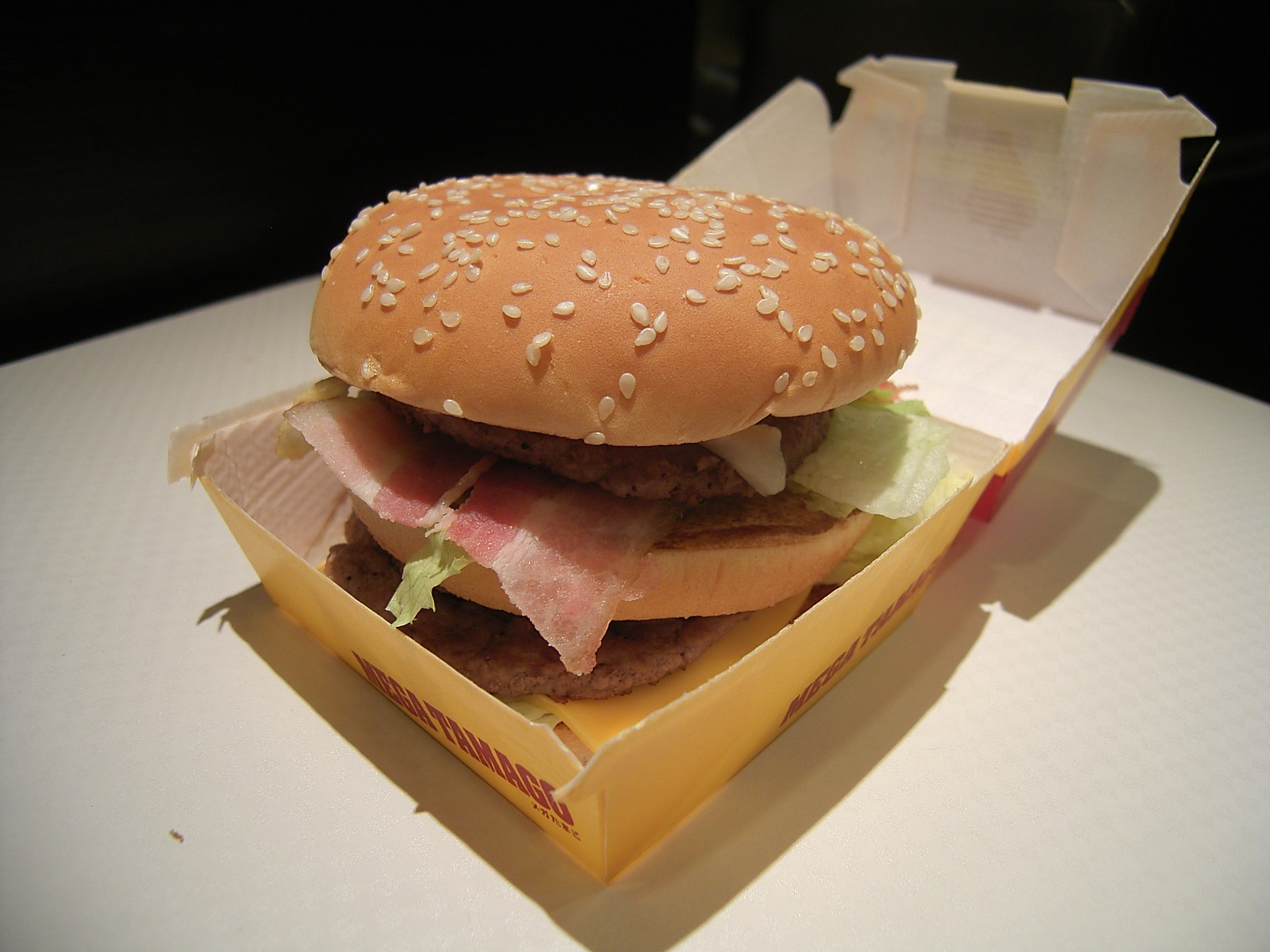
Paperboard clamshell for fast food

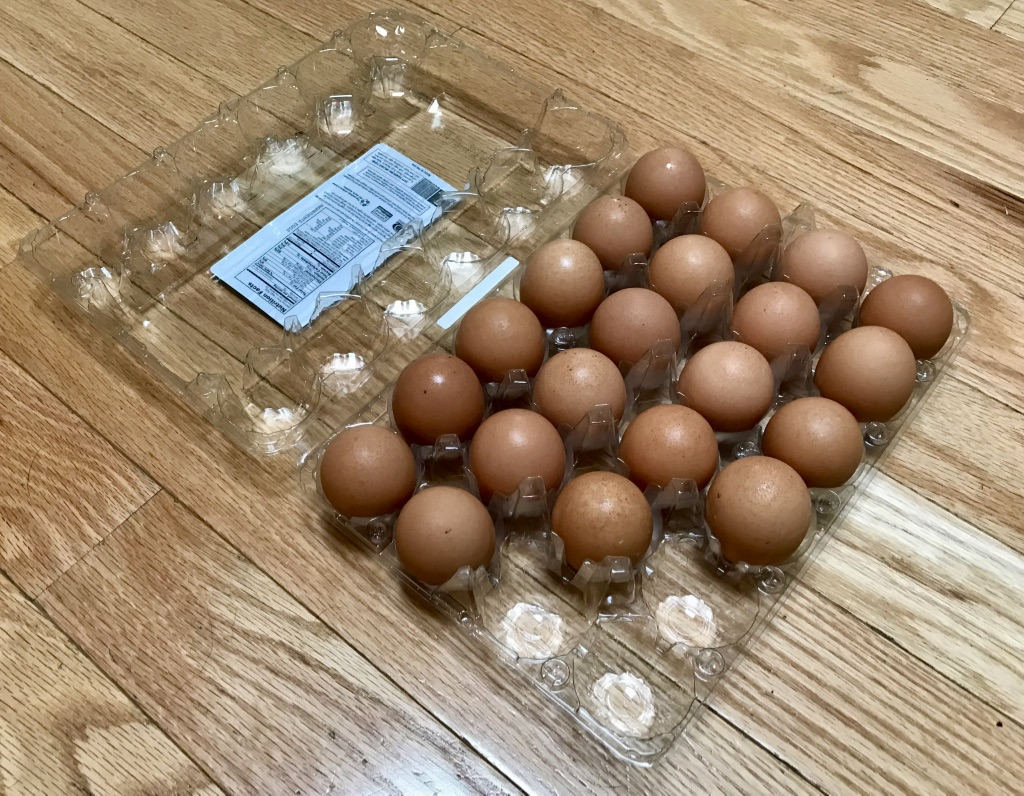
PETE plastic egg carton for 24 eggs

A clamshell is a one-piece container consisting of two halves joined by a hinge area which allows the structure to come together to close. Clamshells can be made to be reusable and reclosable, or can be sealed securely, requiring that they be cut open. They are commonly made of thermoformed plastic.

== History ==
Containers acting similarly to clamshells have been widely used for many years, constructed from a diversity of materials.

American inventor Thomas Jake Lunsford first patented clamshell packaging in 1978. Patent Classification B65D43/162 covers “Non-removable lids or covers hinged for upward or downward movement the container, the lid and the hinge being made of one piece". It lists over ten thousand patents in the last hundred years.

Foam plastic clamshells have been used in fast food restaurants for burgers; paperboard clamshells are currently being used similarly. Clear plastic clamshell containers were used for strawberries by Driscoll’s, a California berry grower, in the 1990s to pack its berries for retail sale.

National Geographic magazine described the containers as "a recycling nightmare".

== Construction ==
Clamshell containers can be made of a variety of materials. Plastics such as polystyrene, polyester, PVC, foam sheets, etc. The material can be made by thermoforming or can be injection molded into the desired shapes. A single piece of material is used for the top and bottom with a "living hinge" that is integral to the material, rather than added separately.

Folding cartons made of paperboard or molded pulp can also be of a clamshell shape. It can also be made of cellulose fiber such as sugarcane-bagasse, wheatstraw, wood pulp, etc.

== Closing ==
Clamshells can use a variety of means of closing or sealing. Some have self-locking tabs, snaps, or have a friction fit. Others use adhesive, pressure-sensitive tape, labels, staples, or are heat-sealed.

== Opening ==
Many clamshell containers are easy to open, and reuse, by consumers. When plastic clamshell containers are securely heat sealed, they are tamper resistant and deter package pilferage.

These security packages are intentionally difficult to open, sometimes requiring customers to use scissors or a knife. Difficulty opening such packaging can be frustrating to the point of wrap rage. Some people injure themselves trying to open security packaging which in the United Kingdom has been cited as the most frustrating to open.

== See also ==
- Clamshell design
- Foam food container
- Living hinge
- Solander box
