= Flection =

Flection or flexion may refer to:

- The action of bending or the state of being bent
- Flexion, the action of bending a joint using a flexor muscle
- Curvature, the deviation from straightness
- Inflection, the modification of a word to express a grammatical meaning

== See also ==
- Flexure (disambiguation)
