= Solander box =

Book-shaped container for printed material

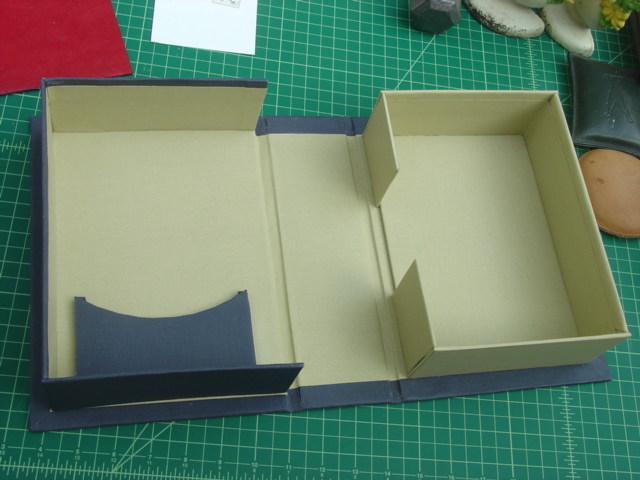
A Solander box

A Solander box ("S" may also be in lowercase), or clamshell case (mainly in American English), is a book-form case used for storing manuscripts, maps, prints, documents, old and precious books, etc. It is commonly used in archives, print rooms and libraries. It is named after the Swedish botanist Daniel Solander (1733–1782), who is credited with its construction while working at the British Museum, where he catalogued the natural history collection between 1763 and 1782.

The case is usually constructed of hardcover or wood, and has a hinged lid connected to its base. Both lid and bottom sections of the box have three fixed side sections or "lips"; the lid is slightly larger so that the side pieces "nest" when the case is closed. The fourth "spine" side has flexible joints where it joins the main top and bottom pieces and so goes flat onto the surface where the box is opened. The front-edge of the case often contains a clasp for closure. The exterior is covered with heavy paper, fabric, buckram or leather, and its interior may be lined with padded paper or felt, especially if made for a book. All materials should be acid-free for conservation. The depth of the box is normally about five inches, if it is not made for a specific object, and various standard sizes are made, with traditional names including "royal", "imperial", "elephant" and others. Ones for very old books will typically be custom made to an exact size. The boxes are stored flat, and are strong enough to be kept in small stacks.

A simplified and undecorated form of Solander box termed a "phase box" is used for temporary storage of books during conservation work. These are constructed from plain mounting board. Although undecorated, the materials should still be of archival grade.

== See also ==
- Slipcase – Five-sided box for protecting books
- Clamshell – Type of consumer product packaging
