= Giubo =

Type of flexible coupling used to transmit rotational torque

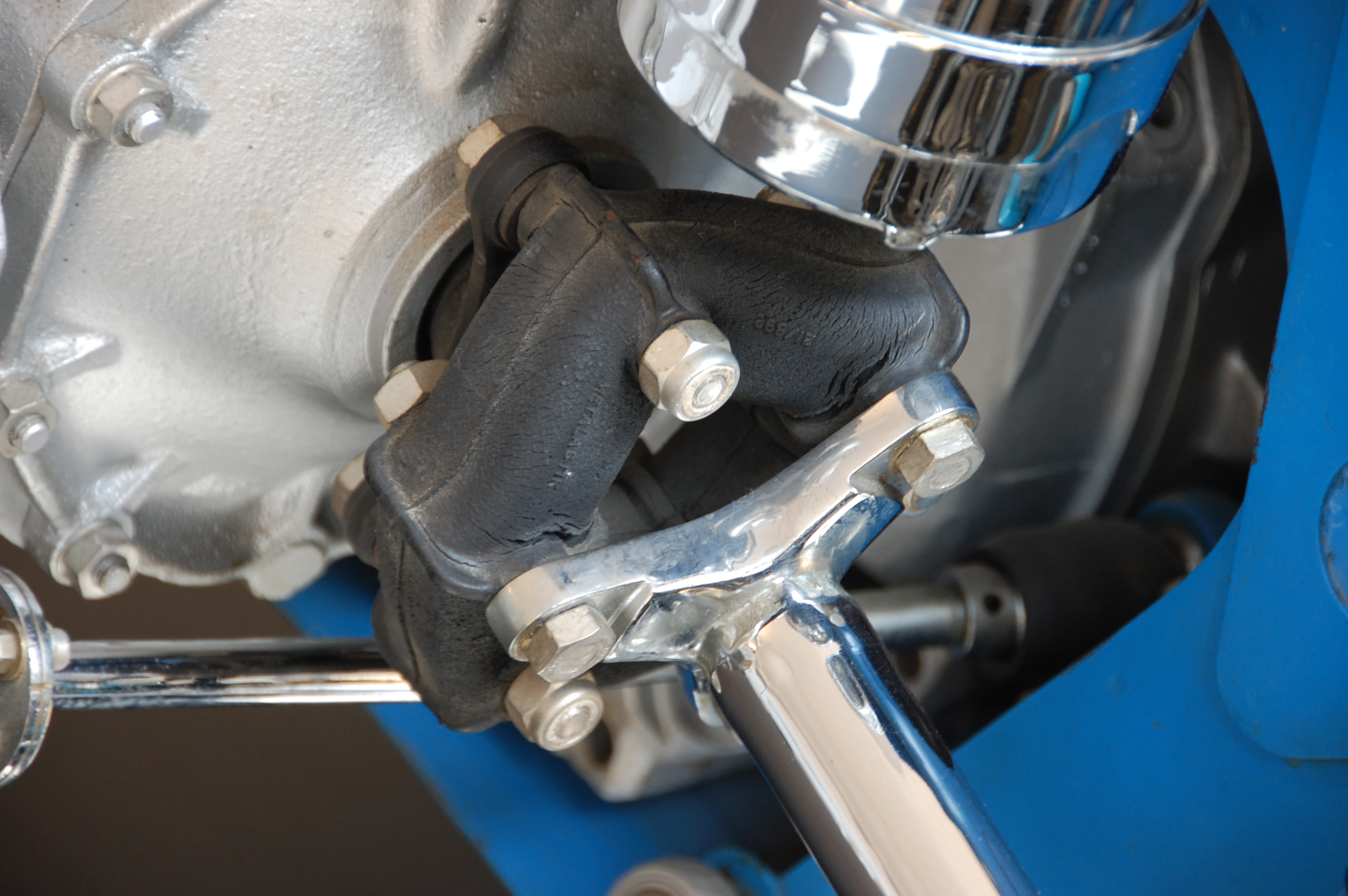
A driveshaft coupling. Note the split damage beginning to appear, likely due to the large axial displacement.

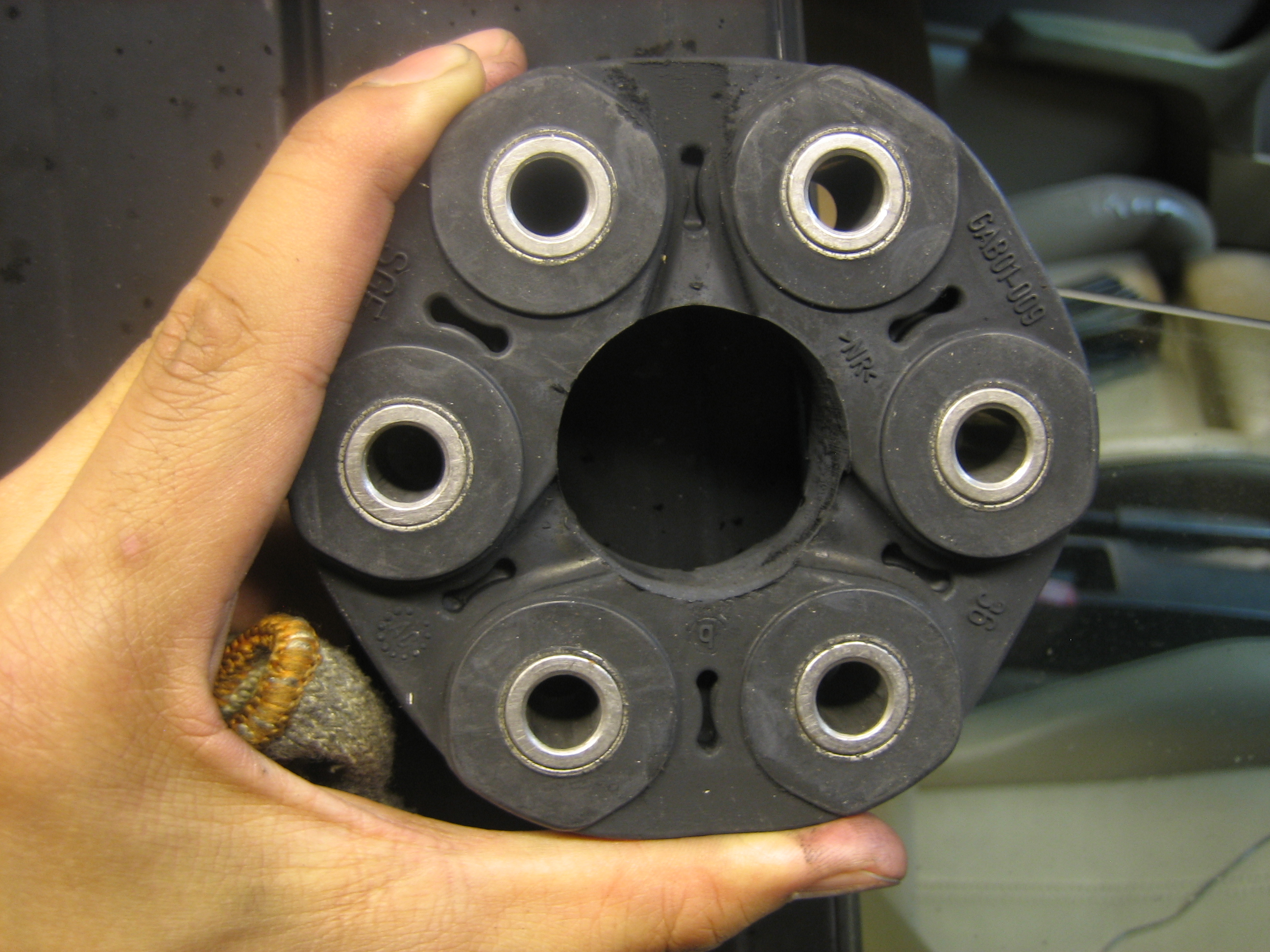
A giubo

A giubo (/ˈdʒuːboʊ/ JOO-boh; etymology: giunto Boschi, "Boschi joint"), also known as a 'flexdisc', and sometimes misspelled as guibo, is a flexible coupling used to transmit rotational torque between the drive shaft and the companion flange on mechanical devices, such as an automobile engine.

The giubo is made from flexible synthetic rubber and is designed to allow some angular and axial misalignment while reducing driveline vibration in mechanical power transmission applications.

== How it works ==
Input and output shaft flanges are bolted to the giubo on either side using alternating hole positions, so that the flanges are not connected directly to one another but instead only through the rubber material of the coupling. The elasticity of the rubber absorbs vibration and flexes for alignment. It follows that the rubber must withstand the application's full transmitted torque, for which reason the rubber is often reinforced internally using moulded-in fibre material. The giubo may also have a harmonically "phased" design, typically requiring arrows that are marked on it to point to the corresponding flange arms.

== Name ==
Giubo is a portmanteau of the Italian words giunto ('joint' or 'coupling') and boschi (the surname of the Italian engineer who designed and patented the first flex disc, Antonio Boschi (1896–1988)). Boschi later founded GIUBO SpA, a company solely dedicated to manufacturing flex discs.

== Use ==
The giubo is believed first to have been used for this purpose on the Alfa Romeo model 1900, produced between 1950 and 1959. As used on several British cars, such as the Hillman Imp, Triumph GT6 MKII/GT6+, Lotus Elan and some early versions of the Land Rover Discovery, the item is known as a Rotoflex coupling. The Porsche 917 used a Giubo centered on the rear half-shaft, but in a manner that did not require the joint to laterally flex. Mercedes-Benz cars have used Giubos throughout the line, starting with the W114 and W115 chassis. The Saab 92, 93 and 96 use this type of joint in the drive shafts from the transmission to the front wheels, on the steering column connection to the steering housing, and on the gear change lever to the gear box connection.

== See also ==
- Rag joint
