= Flexure =

Flexible element engineered for specific degrees of freedom

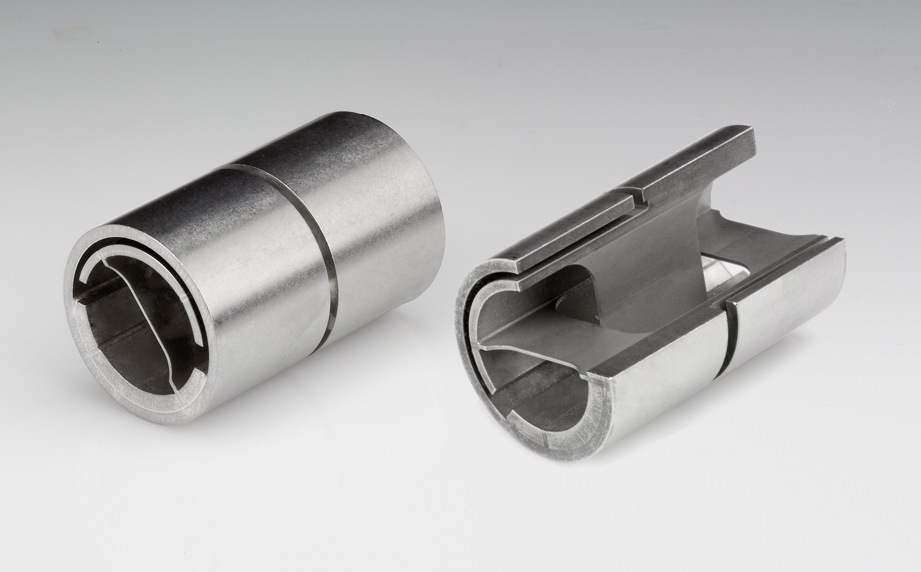
A flexure pivot, utilized in place of bearings for its frictionless adjustment properties.

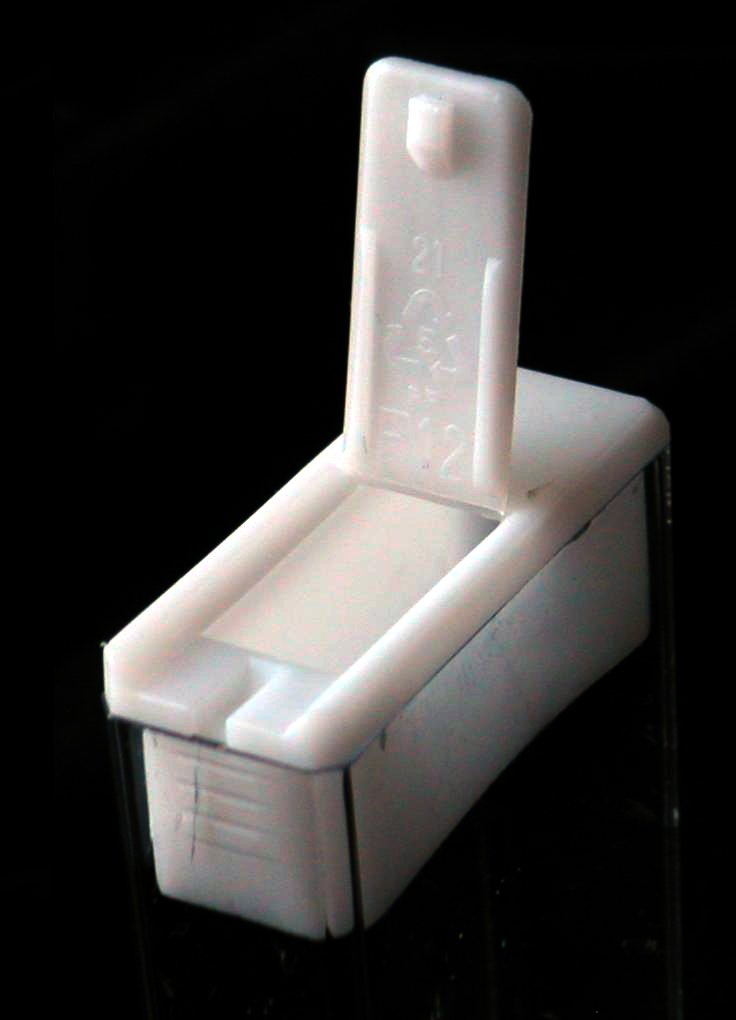
A living hinge (a type of flexure), on the lid of a Tic Tac box. This hinge has one compliant degree of freedom.

A flexure is a flexible element (or combination of elements) engineered to be compliant in specific degrees of freedom. Flexures are a design feature used by design engineers (usually mechanical engineers) for providing adjustment or compliance in a design.

== Flexure types ==
Most compound flexure designs are composed of three fundamental types of flexure:

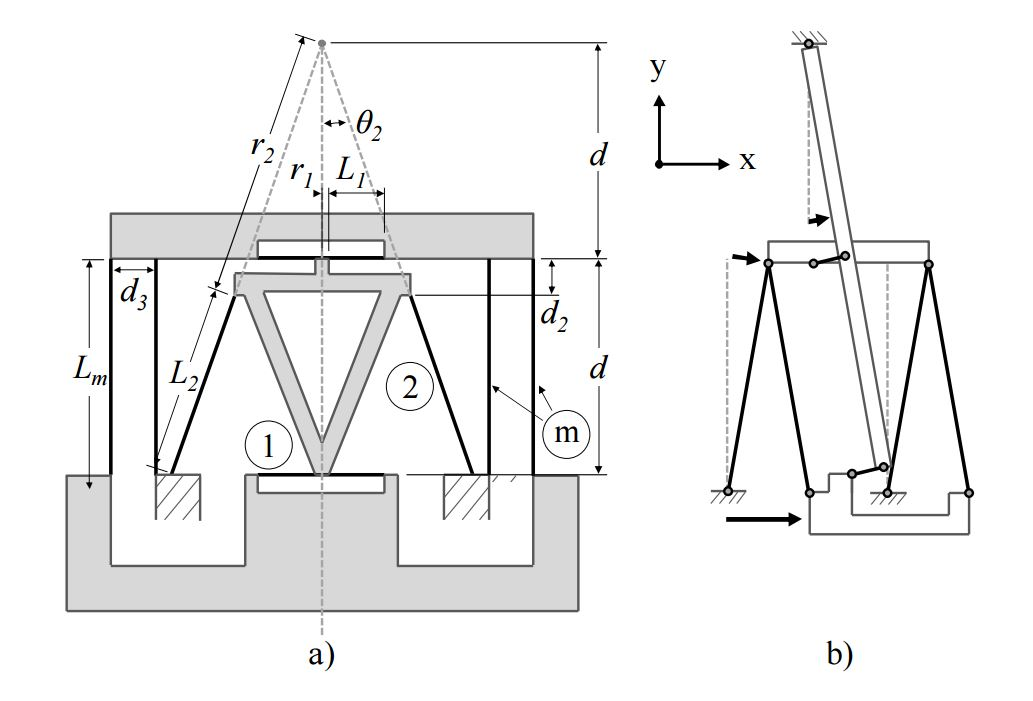
Example compound flexure design with nested linkage

- Pin flexure - a thin bar or cylinder of material, constrains three degrees of freedom when geometry matches a notch cutout
- Blade flexure - thin sheet of material, constrains three degrees of freedom
- Notch flexure - thin cutout on both sides of a thick piece of material, constrains five degrees of freedom
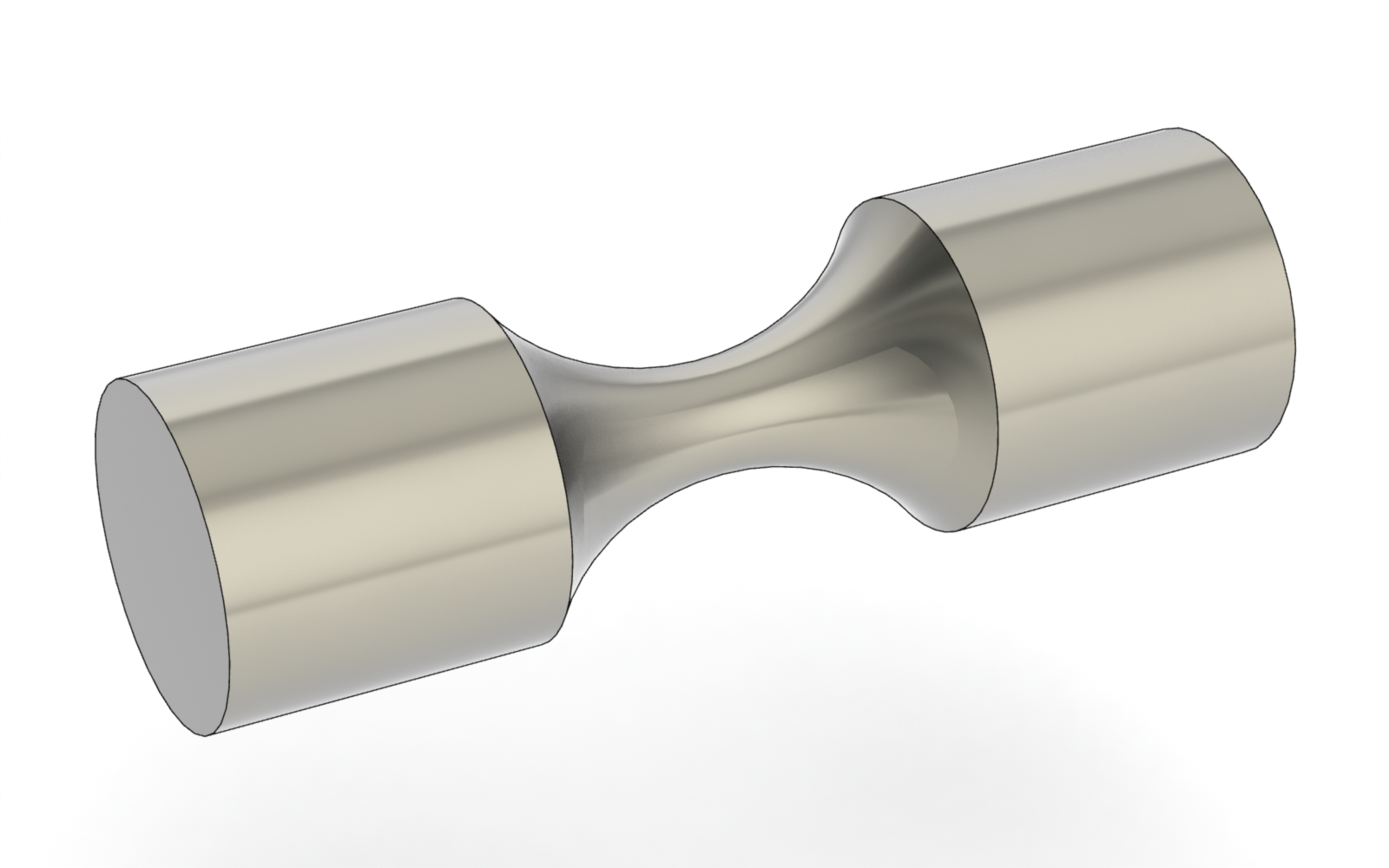
Pin flexure

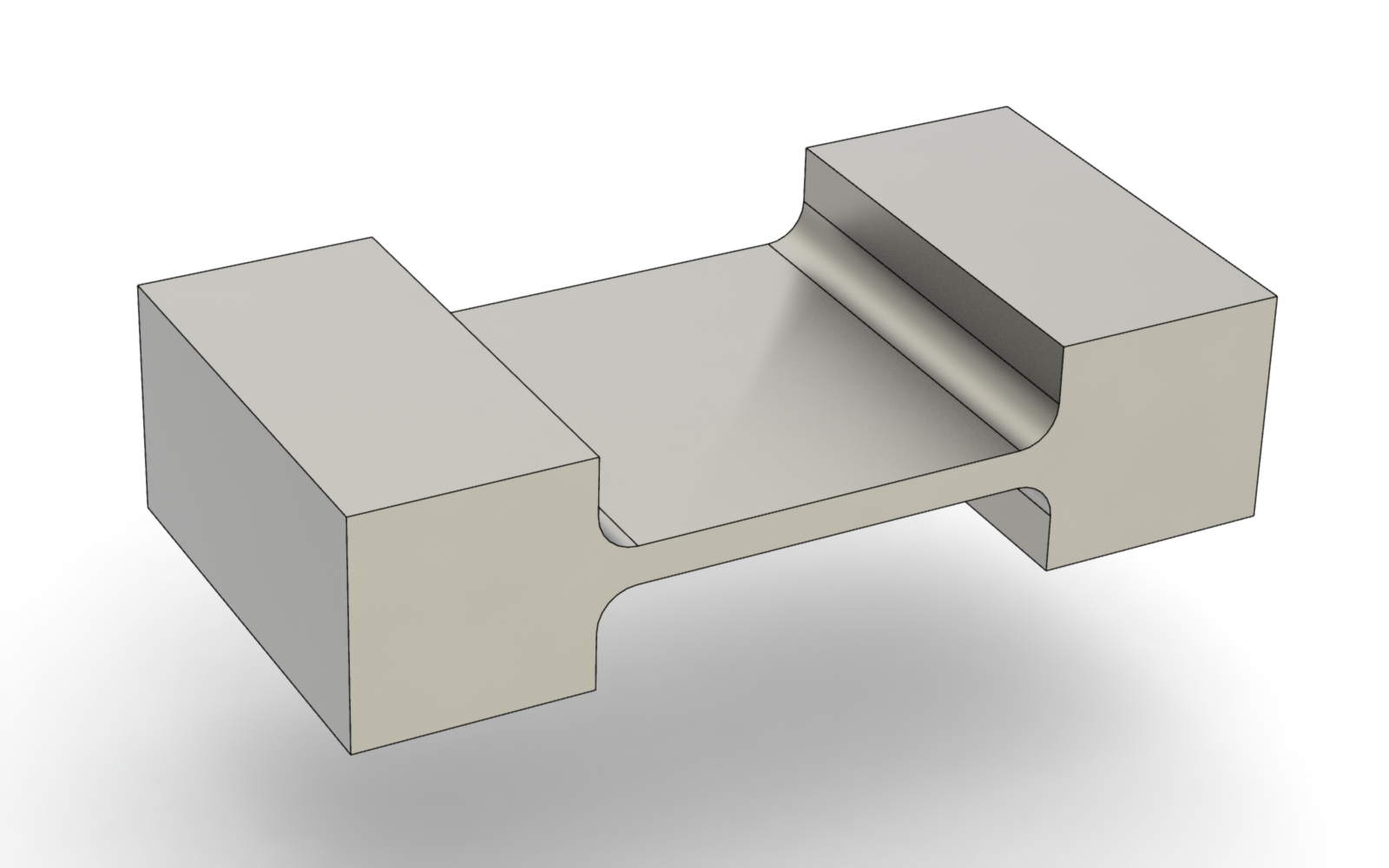
Blade flexure

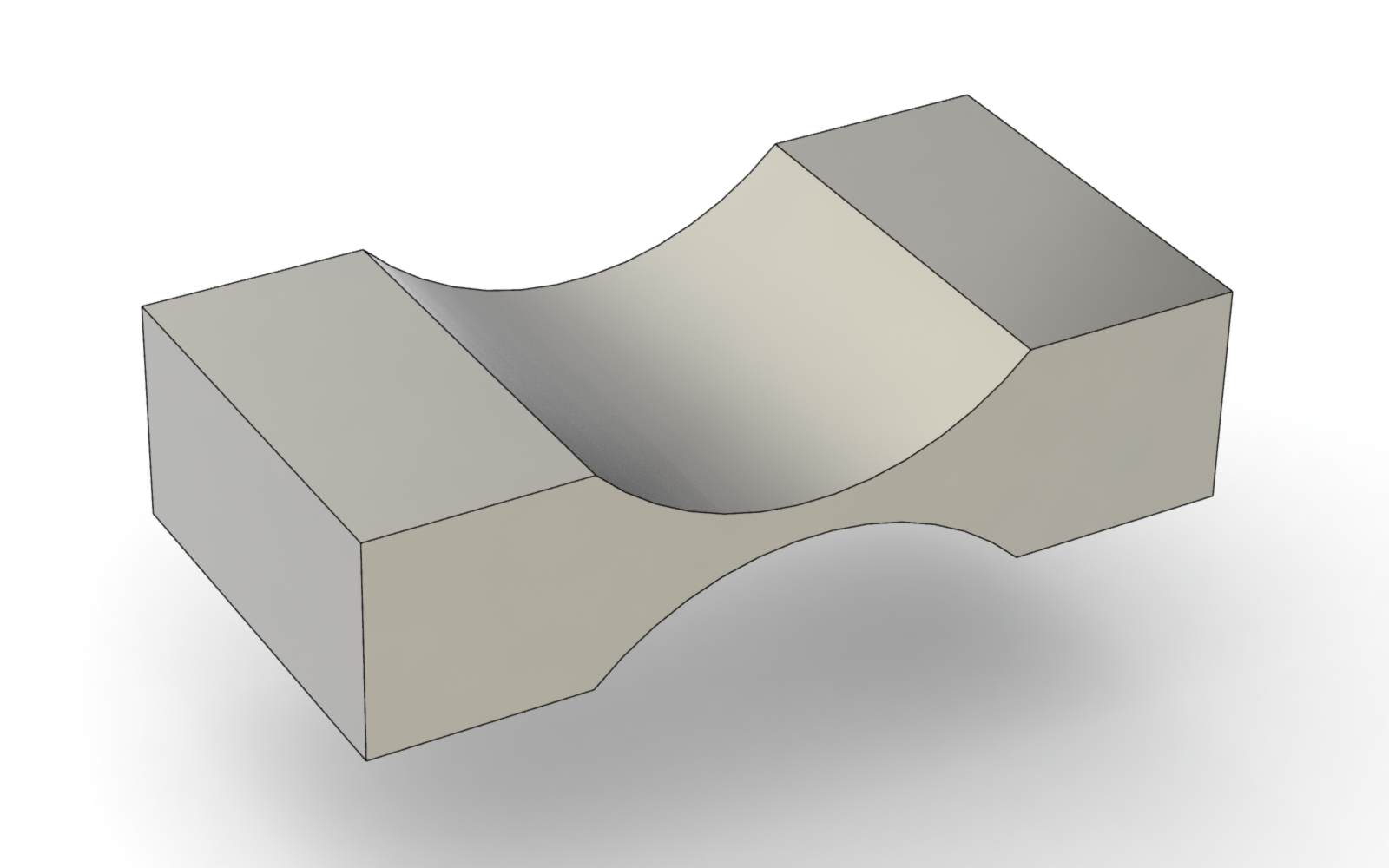
Notch flexure

Since single flexure features are limited both in travel capability and degrees of freedom available, compound flexure systems are designed using combinations of these component features. Using compound flexures, complex motion profiles with specific degrees of freedom and relatively long travel distances are possible.

== Design aspects ==
In the field of precision engineering (especially high-precision motion control), flexures have several key advantages. High precision alignment tasks might not be possible when friction or stiction are present. Additionally, conventional bearings or linear bearings often exhibit positioning hysteresis due to backlash and friction. Flexures are able to achieve much lower resolution limits (in some cases measured in the nanometer scale), because they depend on bending and/or torsion of flexible elements, rather than surface interaction of many parts (as with a ball bearing). This makes flexures a critical design feature used in optical instrumentation such as interferometers.

Due to their mode of action, flexures are used for limited range motions and cannot replace long-travel or continuous-rotation adjustments. Additionally, special care must be taken to design the flexure to avoid material yielding or fatigue, both of which are potential failure modes in a flexure design.

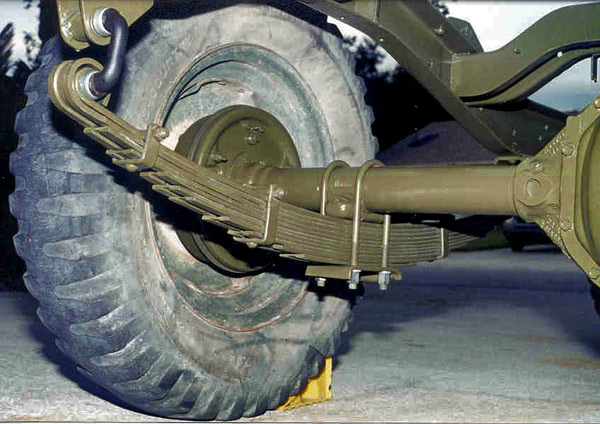
A leaf spring suspension is an example of a flexure design in automotive engineering.

== Design examples ==
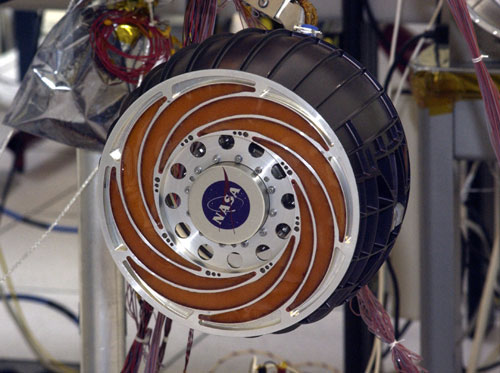
Drive wheel from the Mars Exploration Rovers, with integral suspension flexures.

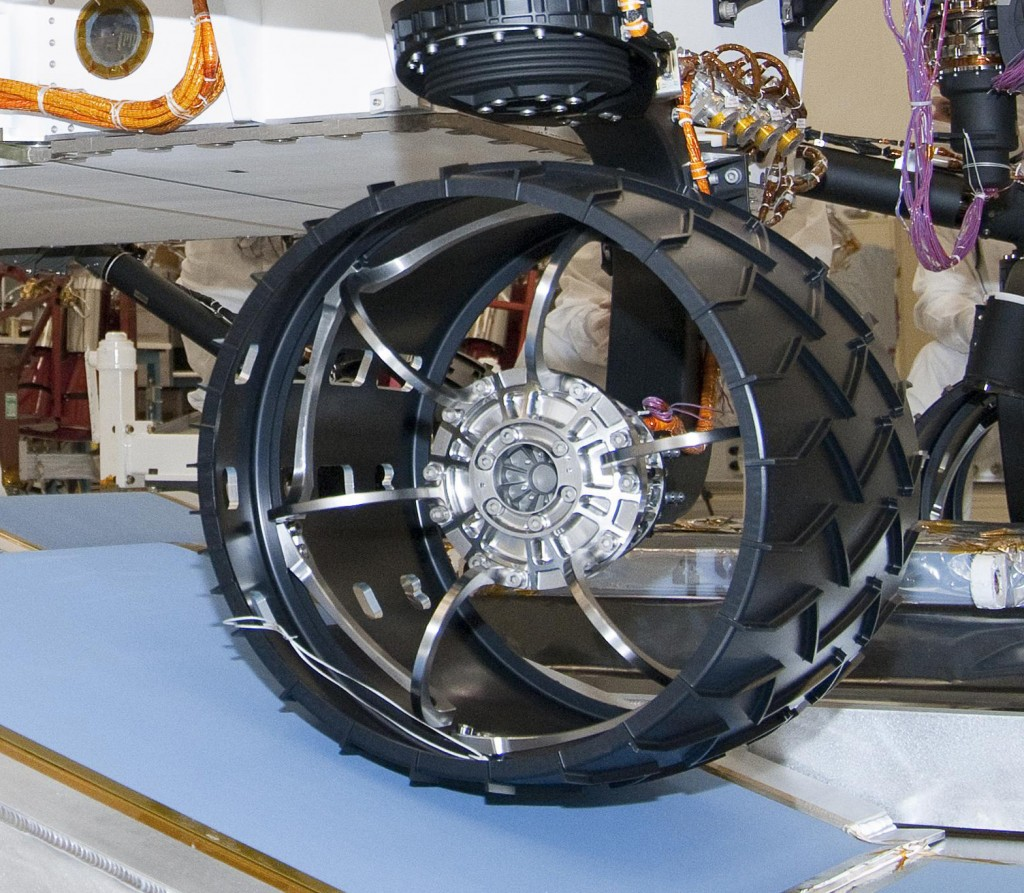
Drive wheel from the Mars Science Laboratory rover Curiosity, with integral suspension flexures.

- Living hinge: Flexure which acts as a hinge. Preferred for their simplicity, as they can be included as a feature in a single piece of material (as in a Tic Tac box's lid).
- Leaf spring: Leaf Springs are commonly used in vehicle suspensions. Leaf springs are an example of a flexure system with one compliant degree of freedom.
- Flex Pivot: Frictionless pivoting component, for use in precision alignment applications.
- NASA's Mars Exploration Rovers and the Mars Science Laboratory rover Curiosity have engineered flexures in their wheels which act as vibration isolation and suspension for the rovers.

== See also ==
- Flexure bearing
- Compliant mechanism
