= Living hinge =

Flexible hinge

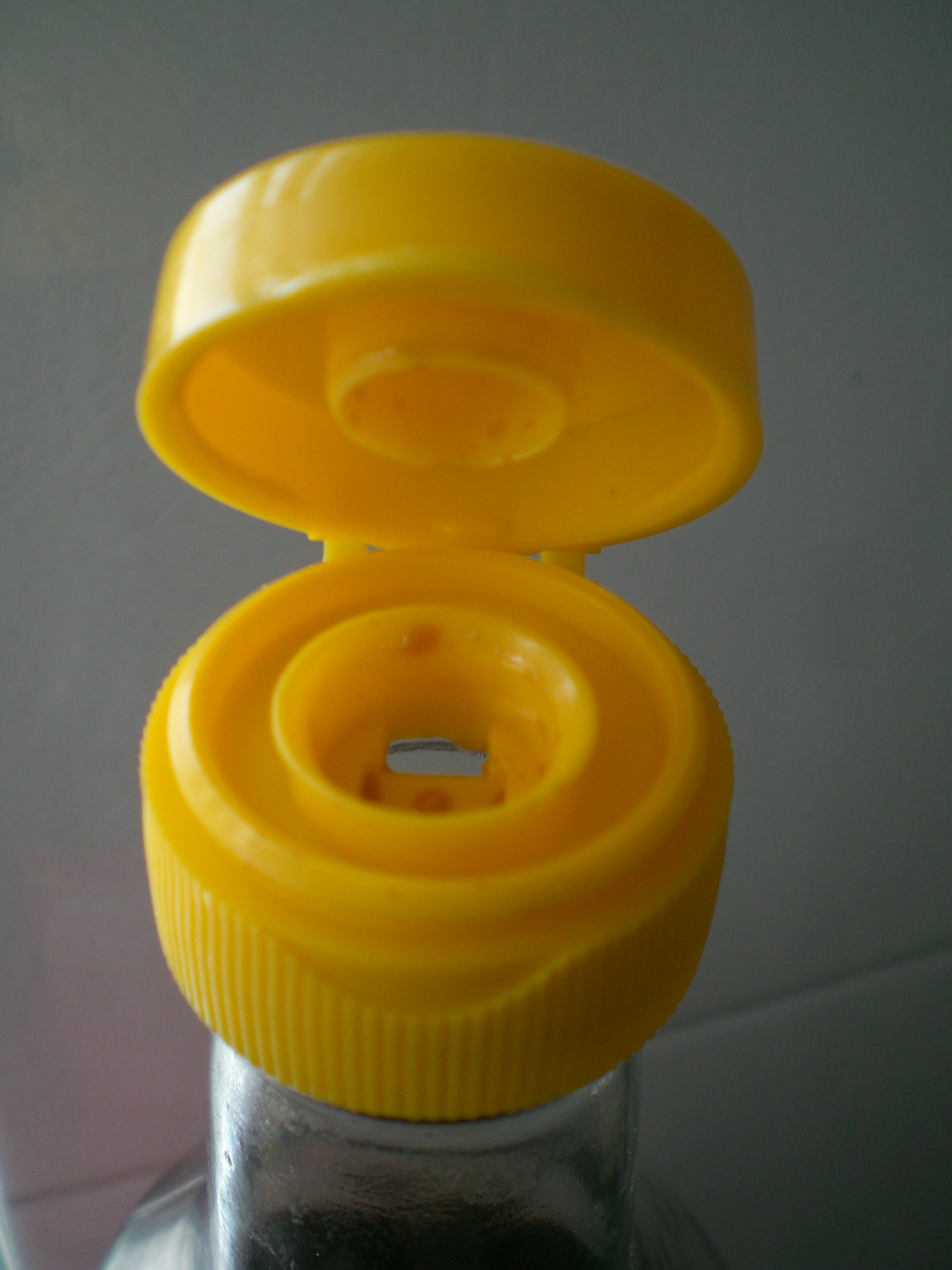
Bottle cap with a living hinge

A living hinge or integral hinge is a thin flexible hinge (flexure bearing) made from the same material as the two rigid pieces it connects.

== Description ==
A living hinge or integral hinge is a thin flexible hinge (flexure). It is made from the same material as the two rigid pieces it connects. It is typically thinned or cut to allow the rigid pieces to bend along the line of the hinge. The minimal friction and very little wear in such a hinge makes it useful in the design of microelectromechanical systems, and the low cost and ease of manufacturing makes them common in clamshell containers and disposable, recyclable packaging.

== Plastic ==
Plastic living hinges are typically manufactured in an injection molding operation that creates all three parts at one time as a single piece, and if correctly designed and constructed, it can remain functional over the life of the part. Thermoforming can also produce hinged products. Polyethylene and polypropylene are considered to be the best resins for living hinges, due to their excellent fatigue resistance. Acrylonitrile butadiene styrene (ABS) is also common.

== Wood ==
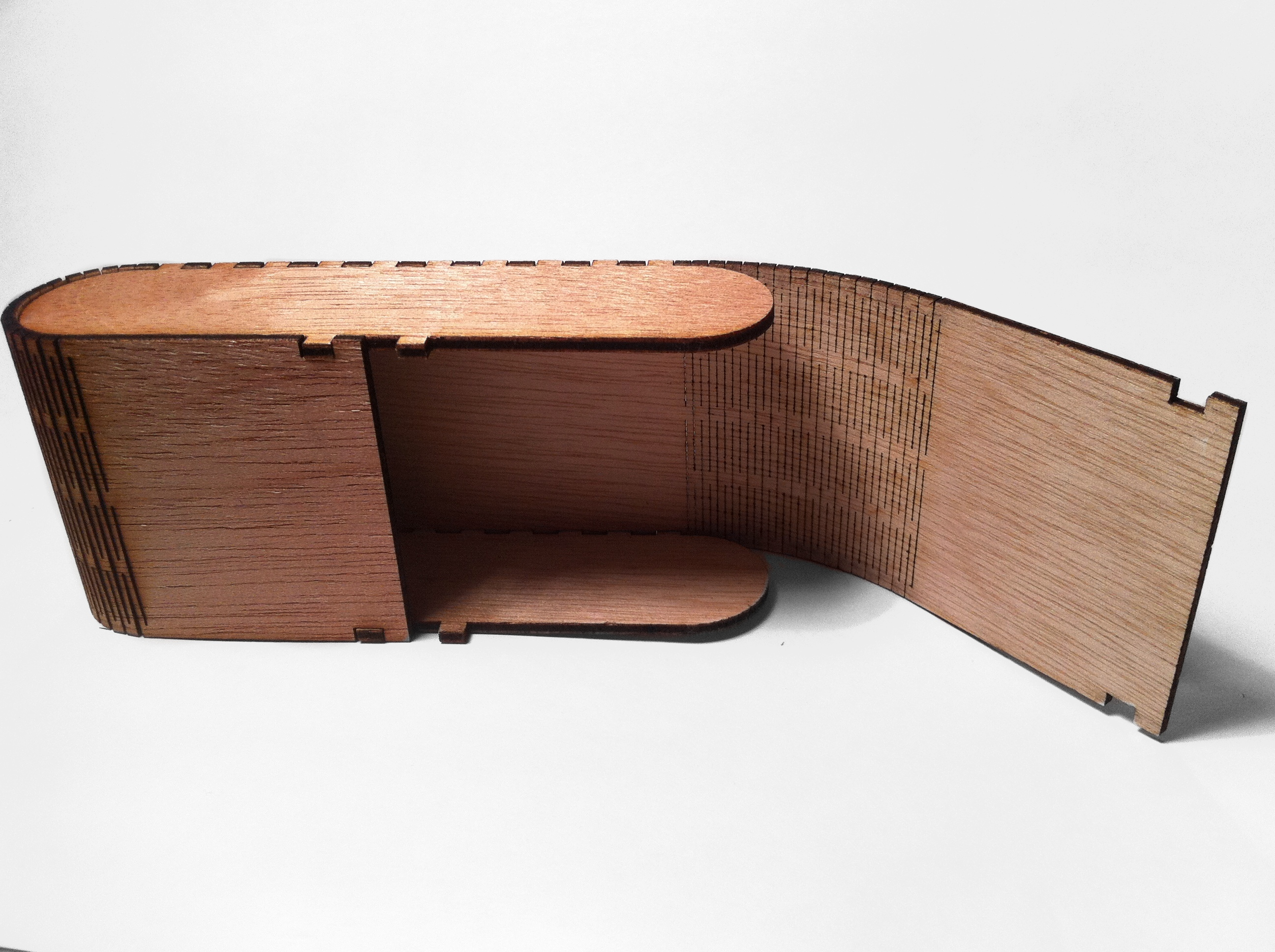
A laser cut plywood box with two living hinges

A variant on the kerf bend can be used to create living hinges in laser cut wood. The technique is popular for making light-duty hinges with large radii. It is also possible to create a living wood joint by hand, but the result is less accurate.

== Gallery ==
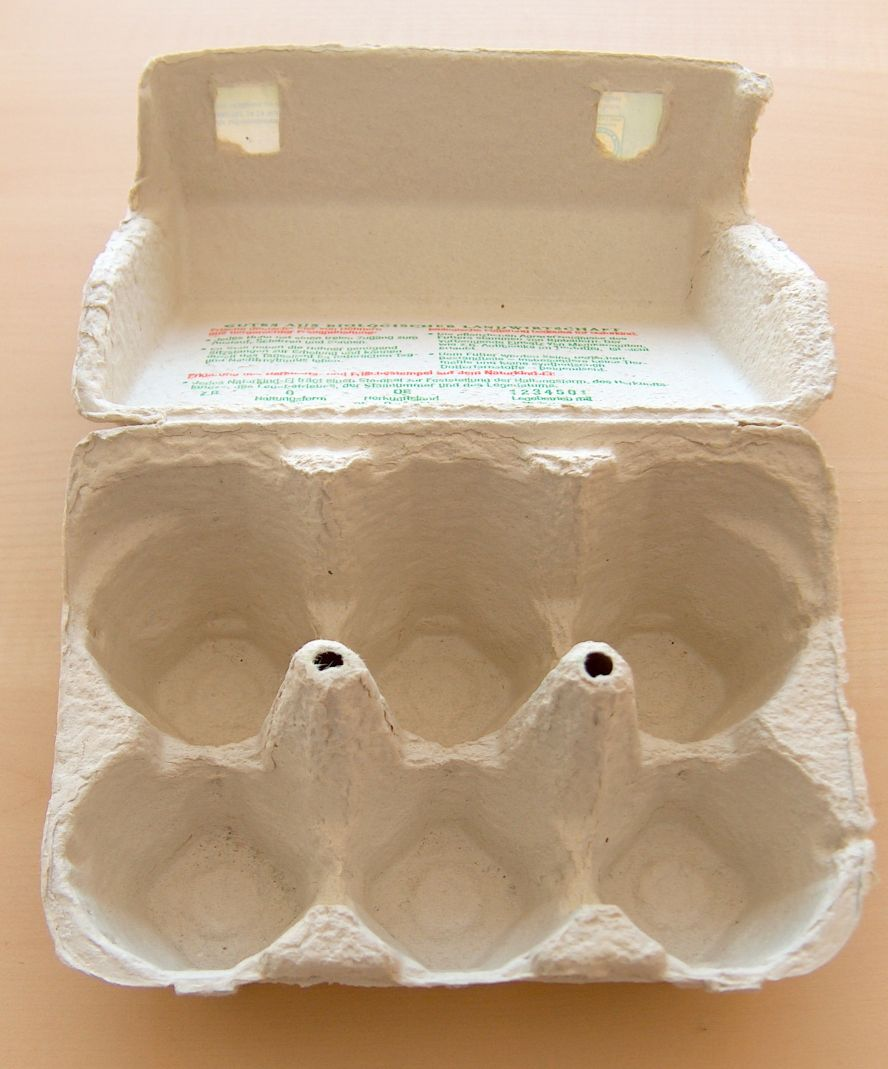
A pulp egg carton using a living hinge

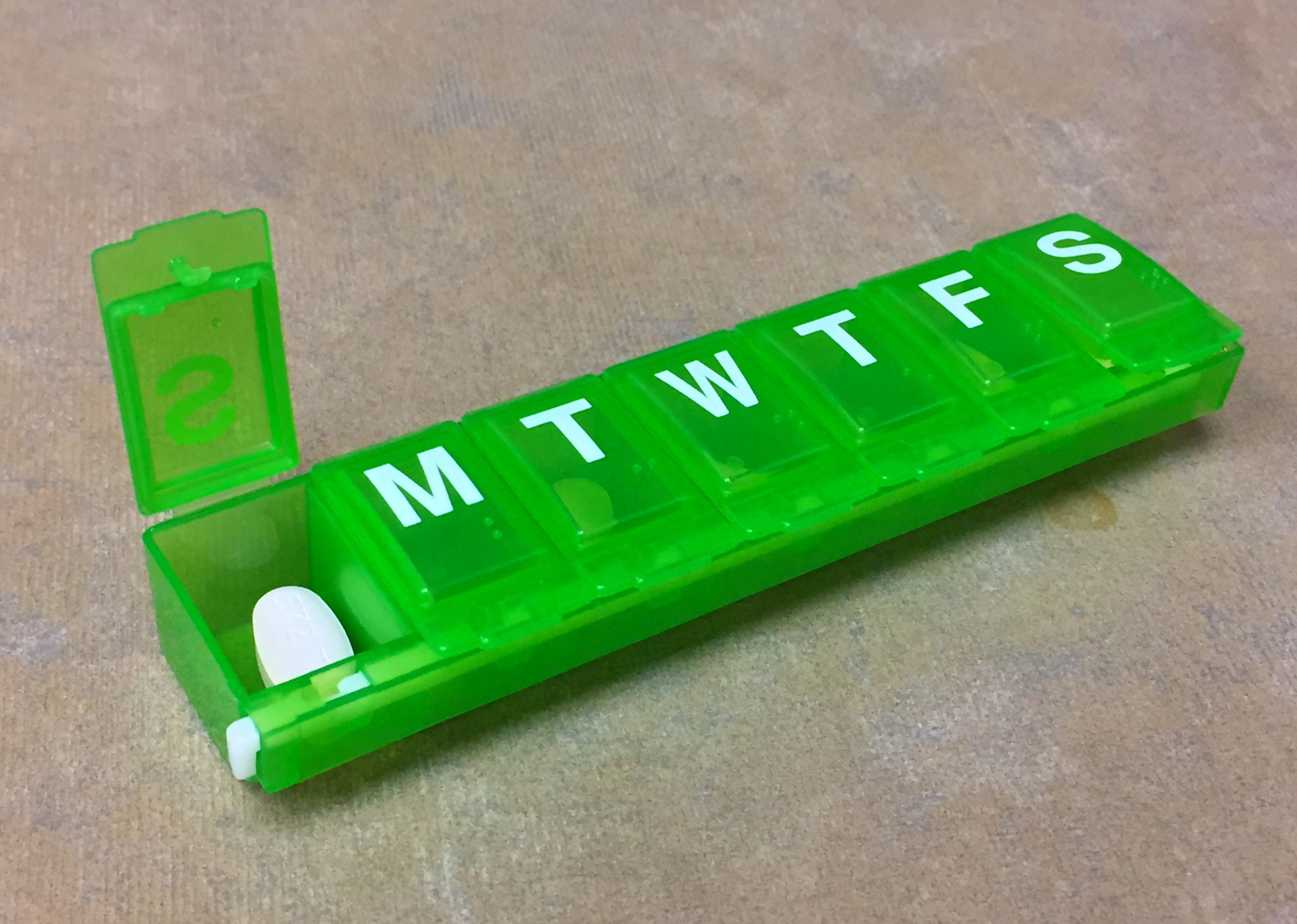
Pill box with hinged lids to compartments

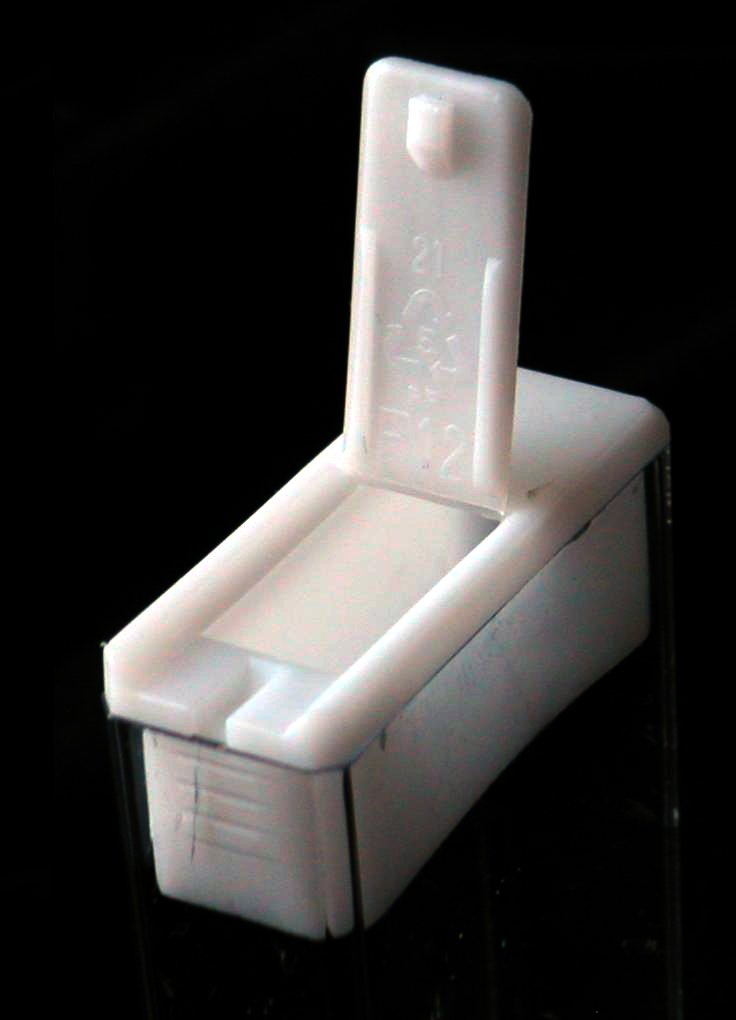
A living hinge on the lid of a Tic Tac box.

== See also ==
- Clamshell (container)
- Flexure bearing
- Plastic bending
- Plastic hinge
