= DynaTAC =

1980s cellphone series

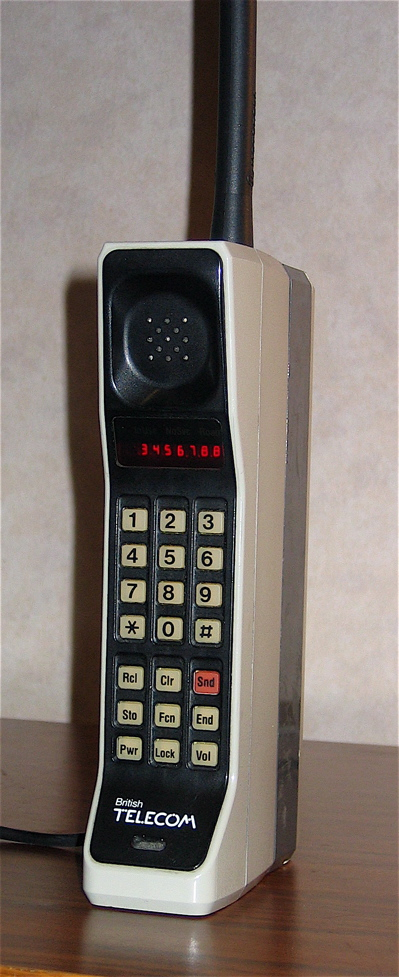
- A DynaTAC 8000X, the first commercially available handheld mobile phone from 1984
- Manufacturer: Motorola
- First released: March 6, 1983; 43 years ago
- Availability by region: 13 April 1984 (wide availability)
- Discontinued: 1994; 32 years ago
- Successor: MicroTAC
- Compatible networks: Advanced Mobile Phone System or GSM on Ameritech
- Form factor: Brick
- Dimensions: 10 in (250 mm) Height
- Weight: 2.5 lb (1.1 kg)
- Charging: 10 Hours
- Display: LED or vacuum fluorescent display
- Data inputs: Push-button
- Made in: USA

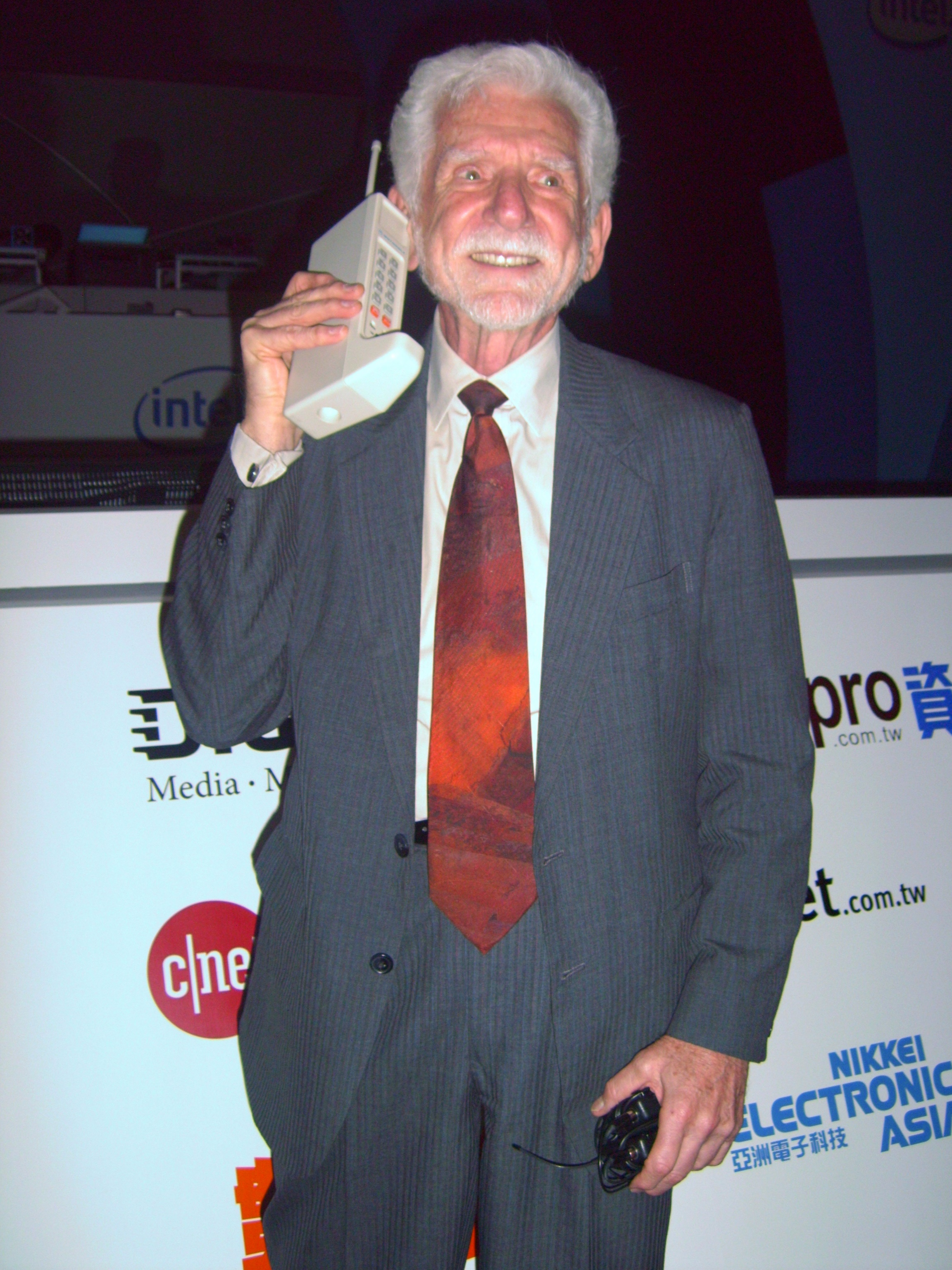
Electrical engineer Martin Cooper of Motorola made the first publicized handheld mobile phone call on a prototype DynaTAC model on April 3, 1973. This is a reenactment in 2007.

The DynaTAC is a series of cellular telephones manufactured by Motorola from 1983 to 1994. Unveiled on March 6, 1983, the DynaTAC was the first commercially available handheld cellular phone. A full charge took roughly 10 hours, and it offered 30 minutes of talk time. It also offered an LED display for dialing or recall of one of 30 phone numbers. It was priced at US$3,995 in 1984, its commercial release year, equivalent to $12,804.76 in 2025.

Several models followed, starting in 1985 with the 8000s and continuing with periodic updates of increasing frequency until 1993's Classic II. The DynaTAC was replaced in most roles by the much smaller MicroTAC when it was first introduced in 1989, and by the time of the StarTAC's release in 1996, it was obsolete.

== Name ==
DynaTAC was an abbreviation of "Dynamic Adaptive Total Area Coverage". The TAC abbreviation would later also be used on the MicroTAC, StarTAC and TeleTAC lines of products.

== History ==
The first cellular phone was the culmination of efforts begun at Bell Labs, which first proposed the idea of a cellular system in 1947, and continued to petition the Federal Communications Commission (FCC) for channels through the 1950s and 1960s, and research conducted at Motorola. In 1960, electrical engineer John F. Mitchell became Motorola's chief engineer for its mobile communication products. Mitchell oversaw the development and marketing of the first pager to use transistors.

Motorola had long produced mobile telephones for cars that were large and heavy and consumed too much power to allow their use without the automobile's engine running. Mitchell's team, which included Martin Cooper, developed portable cellular telephony, and Mitchell was among the Motorola employees granted a patent for this work in 1973; the first call on the prototype was completed, reportedly, to a wrong number.

Motorola announced the development of the Dyna-Tac in April 1973, saying that it expected to have it fully operational within three years. Motorola said that the Dyna-Tac would weigh 3 pounds (1.4 kg) and would cost between $60 and $100 per month. Motorola predicted that the cost would decrease to $10 or $12 per month in no more than 20 years. Motorola said that, while the Dyna-Tac would not use the same network as the existing mobile service network, it anticipated resolving this so that all mobile devices would use the same network by around 1980. By 1975, Motorola's expectations had changed; the Dyna-Tac was anticipated to be released to the public by 1985 because of U.S. Federal Communications Commission proceedings.

While Motorola was developing the cellular phone itself, from 1968 to 1983, Bell Labs worked on the system called AMPS, while others designed cell phones for that and other cellular systems. Martin Cooper, a former general manager for the systems division at Motorola, led a team that produced the DynaTAC 8000X, the first commercially available cellular phone small enough to be easily carried, and made the first phone call from it. (Note: Martin Cooper was the first person to make an analog cellular mobile phone call on a prototype in 1973.) The DynaTAC 8000X received approval from the U.S. FCC on September 21, 1983, shortly after which Motorola began beta-testing it in the United States. Quantity production of the DynaTAC 8000X commenced early in April 1984, at which point it was fully commercially available.

The Motorola DynaTAC 8000X was very large compared to phones today. This first cell phone was very expensive when it was first released in the United States in 1984. The DynaTAC's retail price, $3,995 (about $12,400 in 2025), ensured that it would not become a mass-market item (the minimum wage in the United States was $3.35 per hour in 1984, which meant that it required more than 1192 hours of work – more than 7 months at a standard 40-hour work week – just working for the phone, without taxes); by 1998, when Mitchell retired, cellphones and associated services made up two thirds of Motorola's $30 billion in revenue.

On October 13, 1983, David D. Meilahn placed the first commercial wireless call on a DynaTAC from his 1983 Mercedes-Benz 380SL to Bob Barnett, former president of Ameritech Mobile Communications, who then placed a call on a DynaTAC from inside a Chrysler convertible to the grandson of Alexander Graham Bell, who was in Germany for the event. The call, made at Soldier Field in Chicago, is considered to be a major turning point in communications. Later, Richard H. Frenkiel, the head of system development at Bell Laboratories, said about the DynaTAC: "It was a real triumph; a great breakthrough."

== Publications ==
U.S. Patent 3,906,166, September 16, 1975 for a Radio Telephone System for the first cell phone was granted by Martin Cooper, Richard W. Dronsurth, Albert J. Leitich, Charles N. Lynk, James J. Mikulski, John F. Mitchell, Roy A. Richardson, and John H. Sangster.

Two names were botched in the original filing; Leitich's surname was erroneously omitted, and Mikulski's first name was omitted. The original document was refiled by Motorola's legal staff, but has not yet been identified.

The seeds of the idea for a portable cell phone can be traced to Mikulski, which were rejected by Mitchell for lack of sufficient business justifications. It is rumored that when Mitchell suddenly recognized during an attempted phone call that his 400 MHz phone had inherent limitations, he immediately reversed his previous decision and championed the portable cell phone concept.

== Description ==
Several prototypes were made between 1973 and 1983. The product accepted by the FCC weighed 28 ounces (790 g) and was 10 inches (25 cm) high, not including its flexible "rubber duck" whip antenna. In addition to the typical 12-key telephone keypad, it had nine additional special keys:

- Rcl (recall)
- Clr (clear)
- Snd (send)
- Sto (store)
- Fcn (function)
- End
- Pwr (power)
- Lock
- Vol (volume)

It employed some of the technology previously used in the ALOHAnet system, including metal–oxide–semiconductor (MOS) transceiver and modem technology.

=== Variants ===
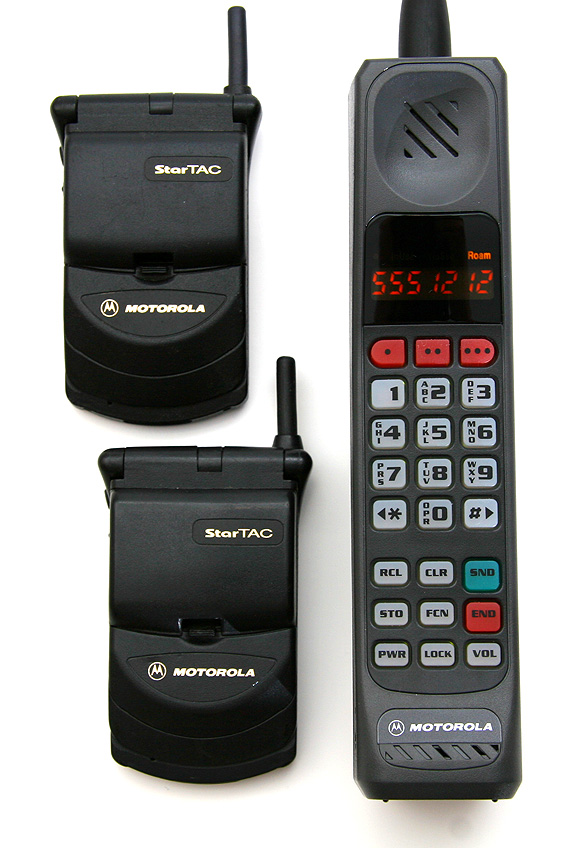
A Classic II (right) and two Motorola StarTAC

The DynaTAC 8 Series, Classic, Classic II, Ultra Classic, and Ultra Classic II had an LED display, with red LEDs; the DynaTAC International Series with green LEDs, and the DynaTAC 6000XL used a vacuum fluorescent display. These displays were severely limited in what information they could show. The battery allowed for a call of up to 60 minutes, after which it was necessary to charge the phone up to 10 hours in a trickle charger or one hour in a fast charger, which was a separate accessory. While still retaining the DynaTAC name, the 6000XL was completely unrelated to the DynaTAC 8000 Series, in that it was a transportable phone meant for installation in a vehicle. The 6000XL was later reconfigured as the Motorola Tough Talker, with a ruggedized build intended for construction sites, emergency workers, and special events planners.

The DynaTAC Series was succeeded by the MicroTAC in 1989.

=== Legacy ===
With the removal of analog network cells nearly all over the world, the DynaTAC models running on AMPS or other analog networks are mostly obsolete. Thus, they are more collector's items than usable cellphones. The International series, however, will still work, but only on GSM 900 cells.

The DynaTac 8000X, due to its resemblance in size and weight to a standard clay-fired brick, was nicknamed the brick phone by users, a term later applied to other brands as a contrast to smaller handsets appearing in the 1990s.

== Portability ==
While it might be considered extremely unwieldy by modern standards, at the time it was considered revolutionary because mobile telephones were bulky affairs installed in vehicles or in heavy briefcases. The DynaTAC 8000X was 10 inches (25 cm) long and weighed 2.5 pounds (1 kg). It was truly the first mobile telephone which could connect to the telephone network without the assistance of a mobile operator and could be carried about by the user.

== Accessories ==
In certain markets, a brass swivel antenna was one of the aftermarket accessories then available.

Motorola also offered a one-hour desktop charger, though the battery could get quite hot while charging at this accelerated rate. In some cases, this could cause major problems with the battery, occasionally short circuiting it and rendering it unusable. Also, charging the battery at a high enough rate to substantially raise its temperature will cause the battery to wear at an accelerated rate, reducing the number of charge-discharge cycles that can be performed before the battery will need to be replaced. (However, considering the high cost of the DynaTAC, the cost of battery replacement would not typically be a concern to DynaTAC owners.)

Available, too, was a snug-fitting zippered leather case which covered the entire body of the phone and had a clear plastic front to make the user interface accessible. It featured a sturdy spring-steel belt clip and a small cutaway at the top to allow the antenna to protrude. Charging could still be performed with the cover on, but change of battery required its removal.

DynaTAC relates to US phones used on the DynaTAC system in the US, not phones in use in the UK.

== See also ==
- AMPS
- History of mobile phones
