= StarTAC =

Mobile phone

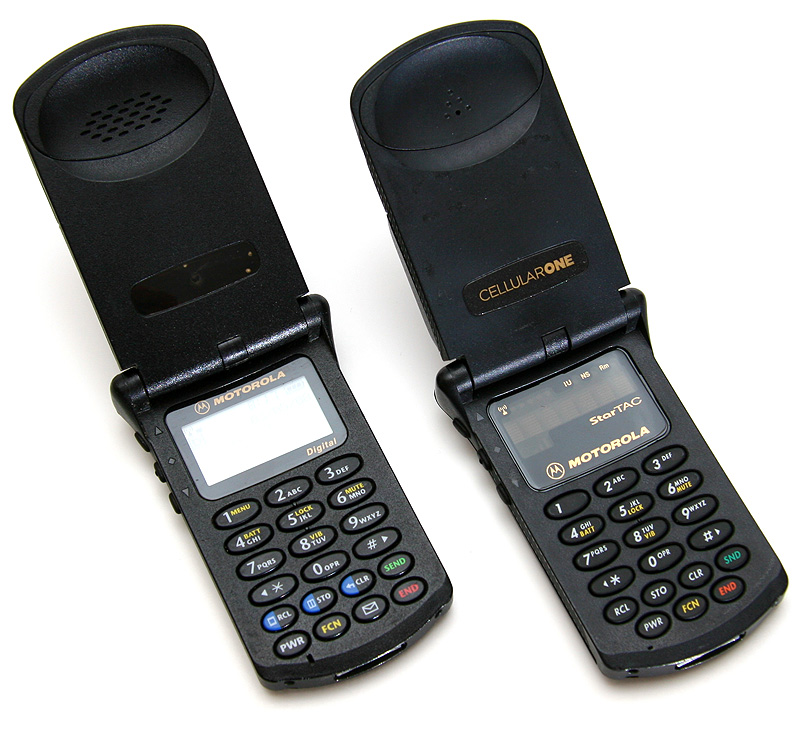
- A digital (left) and an analog (right) StarTAC
- Manufacturer: Motorola
- First released: January 3, 1996; 30 years ago
- Predecessor: MicroTAC
- Successor: Motorola V3620/V3688; Motorola V60
- Compatible networks: AMPS, cdmaOne, TDMA, GSM
- Dimensions: 93 mm × 52 mm × 20 mm (analog/CDMA); 98 mm × 57 mm × 23 mm (StarTAC GSM); 94 mm × 55 mm × 19 mm (StarTAC 130)
- Weight: 88 g (3.1 oz) or more
- Display: Digital models: LCD; Analog models: Segment LED, Alphanumeric LED
- Made in: USA

The StarTAC is a series of flip phones developed and marketed by Motorola beginning in 1996. The first notable clamshell-style cellular mobile phone, the original StarTAC model was the smallest and lightest cell phone on release, being no larger than a pager and weighing only 3.1 ounces (88 g) in its lightest configuration. Officially, Motorola marketed the StarTACs as "wearable".

The StarTAC's groundbreaking design was a development from Motorola's MicroTAC, a semi-clamshell design first launched in 1989. Whereas the MicroTAC's flip folded down from below the keypad, the StarTAC folded up from above the display. While often cited as the world's first clamshell/flip cell phone, NEC of Japan had already developed and released such a cell phone as early as 1991. Nevertheless, the StarTAC is considered the first example of a luxurious or fashionable cell phone.

The earliest StarTAC models were made for analog AMPS networks while later digital GSM models were made for various markets, and the first CdmaOne and TDMA models were released in 1999. The StarTAC was followed by the Motorola 'Vader' V series which reduced the size further, and later succeeded by the Motorola V60 as the company's flagship offering. Beginning in 2000, new StarTACs were sold rebadged under the Timeport and Talkabout names and with minor cosmetic differences.

== History ==
Motorola applied for the StarTAC trademark name in September 1995. The StarTAC was unveiled in North America on January 3, 1996. Then the smallest cell phone available, this AMPS phone was an immediate success. It was introduced at the price of $1000 (approximately $2010 in 2025 adjusted for inflation). Due to the original price of these phones, the majority were purchased with a contract rather than directly from Motorola. During its initial launch, magazine ads for the phone would include an actual size cardboard facsimile that could be pulled from the page to demonstrate the diminutive nature of the device.

Key features included:

- The ability to receive SMS text messages, although only the later digital models had the capability to send messages.
- A weight of approximately 88 grams (3.1 ounces)
- An optional lithium-ion battery, at a time when most phones were restricted to lower capacity NiMH batteries
- Vibrate alert (as an alternative to a ringtone)

Successor TDMA and cdmaOne StarTACs were equally popular. GSM models were available in North America through Powertel, VoiceStream and other early GSM carriers.

=== Design ===
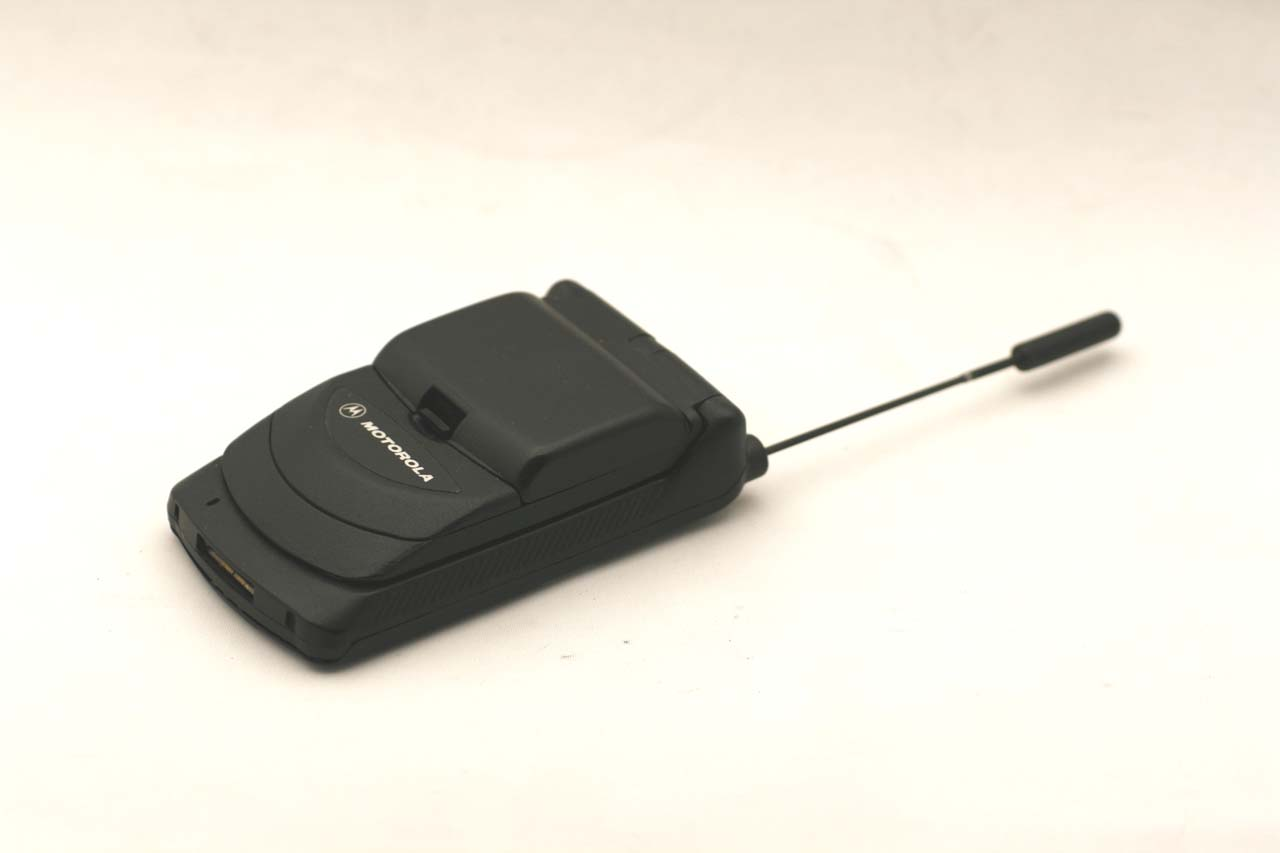
A StarTAC 85 when closed/folded

At the time, the term "flip" in the context of cell phones used to refer to the folding keypad covers as seen on the MicroTAC, and the term "clamshell" also was not known to be in use. Motorola instead called (and marketed) the StarTAC a "wearable" cell phone. It emphasized the ability that it can be clipped onto a belt or even worn around a person's neck using a cord. It was not, however, the first clamshell "flip phone", a distinction that belongs to the TZ-804, a handset made by NEC for the Japanese market in the early 1990s. Precursor designs that used the flip or clamshell form factor include the Grillo telephone from Italy, and the Communicator from the original Star Trek series (both1960s).

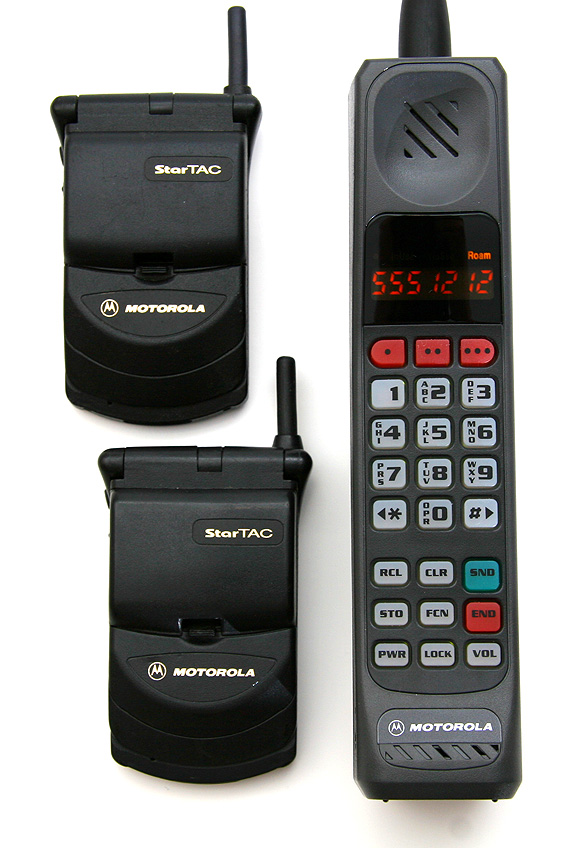
Two StarTACs placed next to a Motorola Classic II "brick" phone

The size of the StarTAC was extremely compact for its time. In 1994, Sony marketed a similarly small handset, CMR-111, although it was significantly heavier at 6.9 ounces (195 g). At 3.1 ounces (88 g) in its lightest configuration, the StarTAC was considerably lighter than other handsets. The Ericsson GH337 and Nokia 2110, which were previously considered relatively 'light', weighed 7.1 ounces (200 g) and 8.3 ounces (235 g) respectively. For comparison, Motorola's original MicroTAC model of 1989, itself the lightest and smallest of its time, weighed 12.3 ounces (349 g).

=== Qualcomm lawsuit ===
Qualcomm announced in March 1997 a clamshell cell phone called Qualcomm Q that resembled the design of the Motorola StarTAC. Motorola sent a restraining order to block sales of the Q in April 1997 but this block was soon lifted. Then, Motorola sued Qualcomm for patent infringement regarding the StarTAC and Q products. In August 1999, a US judge ruled that the Qualcomm Q did not infringe Motorola patents by using a clamshell design similar to the StarTAC. It had been suggested this decision may have impacted the industry regarding clamshell-style products.

== Clip-On Organizer ==
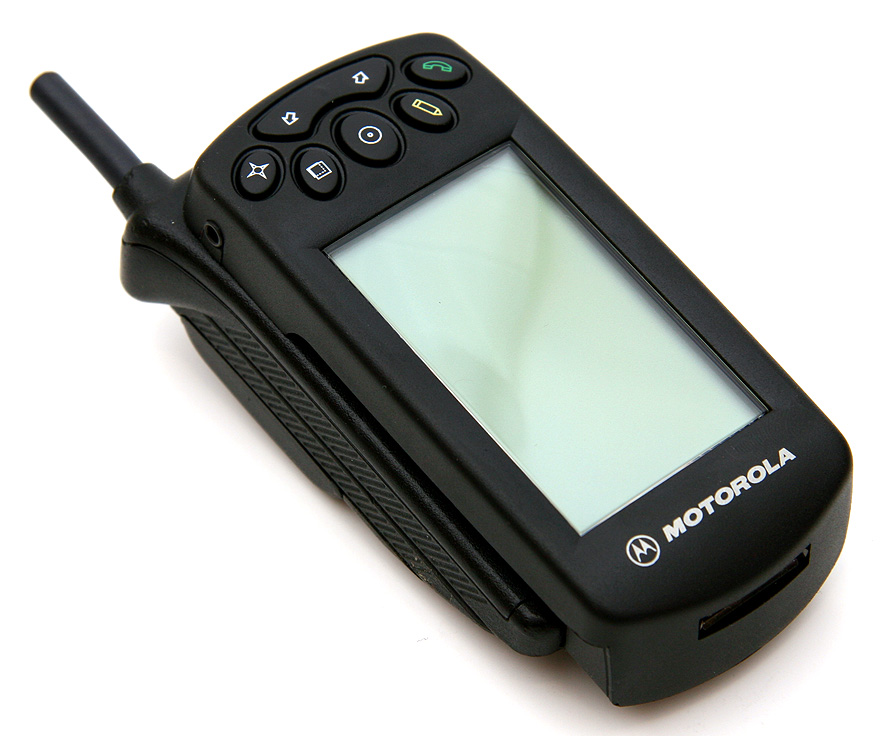
The Clip On Organizer attached to the back of a StarTAC 7860W

In 1999, Motorola released the StarTAC Clip-On Organizer. This is a separate device acting as an electronic address book that attaches to an existing StarTAC unit. Some referred to the combination of the StarTAC and this add-on as a "smartphone".

== Models ==
=== Analog ===
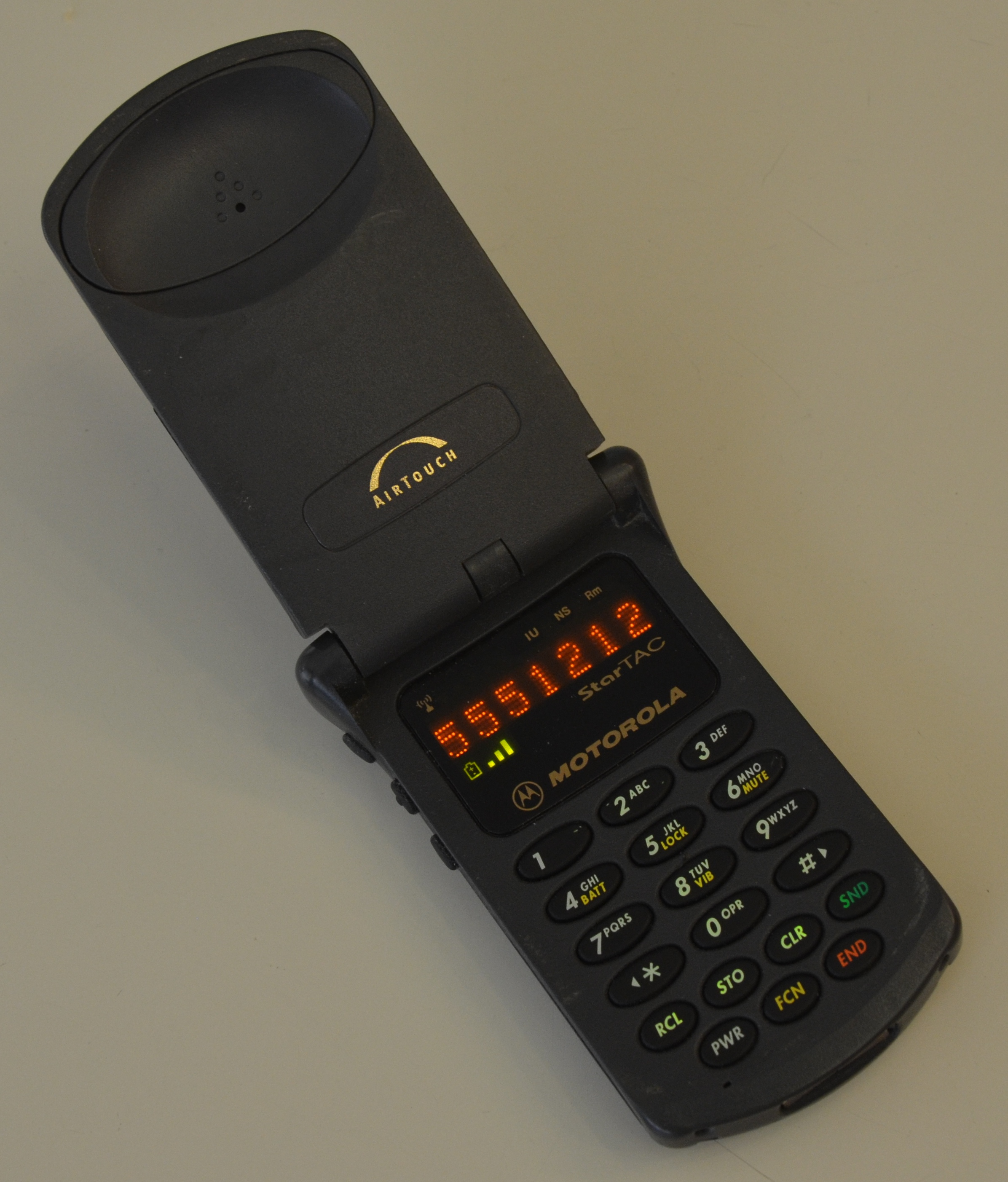
An analog StarTAC 6000/6500

Most first generation analog StarTACs feature LED displays as per Motorola tradition.

==== StarTAC 3000 ====
StarTAC 3000 is the base model released in 1996, which lacks the side volume controls, the smart button, and the contacts for an auxiliary battery. Also the only StarTAC model with a segmented LED display, as opposed to dot matrix LED displays found on other models.

==== StarTAC 6000 and 6500 ====
Announced on September 30, 1996, StarTAC 6000e is a mid-tier model. It has a single-line alphanumeric LED display and adds a Smart Button. This model weighs 3.6 ounces (100 g), slightly more than the base model StarTAC 3000. The StarTAC 6500 is identical to the 6000e, but includes vibration (branded as VibraCall). The StarTAC 6000c is an update released in 1997 to include lower-cost one line LCD.

==== StarTAC 8500 and 8600 ====
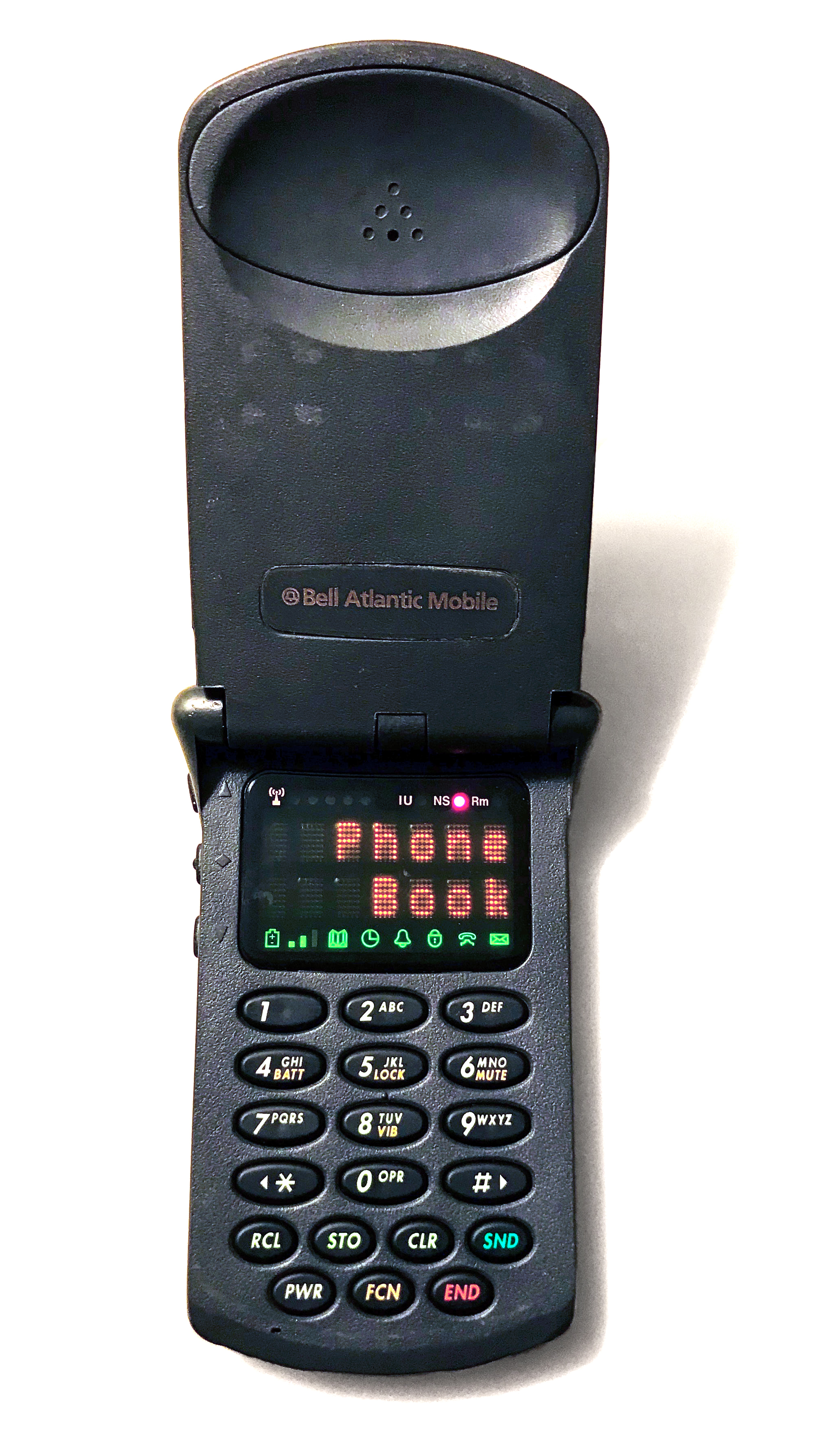
A StarTAC 8500 with its two line display

Motorola StarTAC 8500 is the original model launched in 1996. Included two line LED display. The StarTAC 8600 was the first StarTAC to feature an answering machine a voice recorder (with a recording capacity of 4 minutes). Caller ID functionality is also added (where carrier supported). These also have gold or platinum accents in terms of design. The 8600 became available on May 28, 1997.

==== ETACS StarTAC ====
A StarTAC ETACS network model also existed. This model weighed 91 grams (3.2 oz).

=== TDMA and CDMA ===
Verizon-branded CDMA StarTAC

In July 1998, Motorola announced the first CdmaOne and TDMA StarTACs: the ST7760 (dual mode CDMA 800/AMPS), ST7762 (CDMA 1900) and ST7790 (dual mode TDMA/AMPS).

Upgraded models were unveiled on September 22, 1999: the StarTAC ST7860 (dual mode/single band 800 MHz cdmaOne/AMPS) and StarTAC ST7867W (dual mode/dual band 1900 MHz cdmaOne/AMPS), both of which added an integrated WAP microbrowser and improved address book capabilities. The ST7867W also uses an electro-luminescent backlight display.

Others:

- ST7790i
- ST7797 (Tri Mode/Dual Band 800/1900 MHz. TDMA/800 MHz. AMPS)
- ST7868 (Tri Mode/Dual Band 800/1900 MHz. cdmaOne/800 MHz. AMPS)
- ST7890 (Tri Mode TDMA?)
- ST7897 (Dual Band TDMA)

In 2000, new models began to be released as Motorola Timeport and Motorola Talkabout. They incorporated the same basic StarTAC design but are identifiable by a silver colored casing (Timeport) or half-black half-silver casing (Talkabout) along with a few other differences. The two were largely similar but the Timeports were sold with the Connectivity Kit and sync software, while Talkabouts were marketed to consumers. Other than color, differences could be seen in shape, keypad surface and position, and earpiece.

- Timeport P8090
- Timeport P8097 (dual band/tri mode TDMA/AMPS)
- Timeport P8160 (dual mode)
- Timeport P8167 (dual band/dual mode CDMA 1900/AMPS 800)
- Timeport P8767 (Tri Mode/Dual Band)
- Talkabout T8097 (dual band/tri mode 800/900 TDMA/AMPS)
- Talkabout T8160 (dual mode CDMA/AMPS)
- Talkabout T8167 (dual band/dual mode CDMA/AMPS)

=== GSM ===
GSM StarTAC models were primarily released outside the Americas and were mostly single-band only operating on the GSM 900 band. In some markets, variants were available that operated on GSM 1800 for compatibility with certain carriers. The StarTAC M6088 was the only commercially available dual-band model which was capable of using both 900 and 1800 bands. These models do not work in North America where carriers operate or operated GSM on bands 850 and 1900 instead.

The first digital and GSM StarTAC was announced in October 1996. It weighs 98.5 grams (3.47 oz), making it then the lightest (and first sub-100 grams) GSM cell phone of the time. This is the weight with the smallest capacity (350 mAh) battery. These models were also compatible with Motorola's CELLect PC cards, being able to use the StarTAC's GSM data connection for email, fax or World Wide Web on a notebook computer or a PDA. The GSM StarTAC was released in Europe.

==== StarTAC Select ====
The StarTAC Select for GSM PCS 1900 was released in the US in the second quarter of 1997.

==== StarTAC 70, Rainbow and 7000g ====
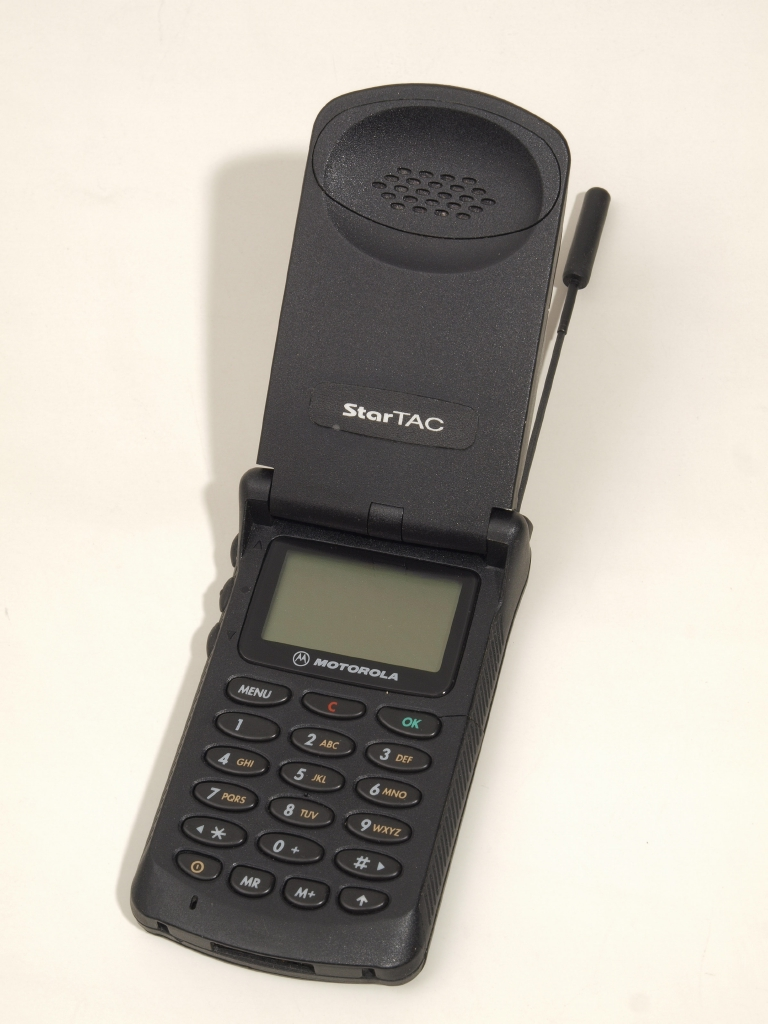
StarTAC 70

The StarTAC 70 is a lower-tier GSM offering released during the second quarter of 1997. The StarTAC 75 is the only single-band GSM 1800 model of the entire range excluding some carrier specific models. The StarTac 70 series includes the 70, 74, 75 and 75+. These models have a two-line alphanumeric LCD and also lacks vibration.

The StarTAC 70 was also sold in a multi-coloured edition, popularly known as the StarTAC Rainbow. The colourful casings could also be used to house the internal PCB and display from the 85, 7000g and 8000g. This would enable fans of the Rainbow series to have the features of the 85 such as the alphanumeric LCD, or one which would operate on GSM 1900. These modified versions are often sold on the used market being touted as original.

The StarTAC 7000g was introduced on September 10, 1997 in North America as a GSM PCS 1900 variant of the 70/75. This model was known to have been problematic.

==== StarTAC 80/90/100, 8000g and MR501/MR701 ====
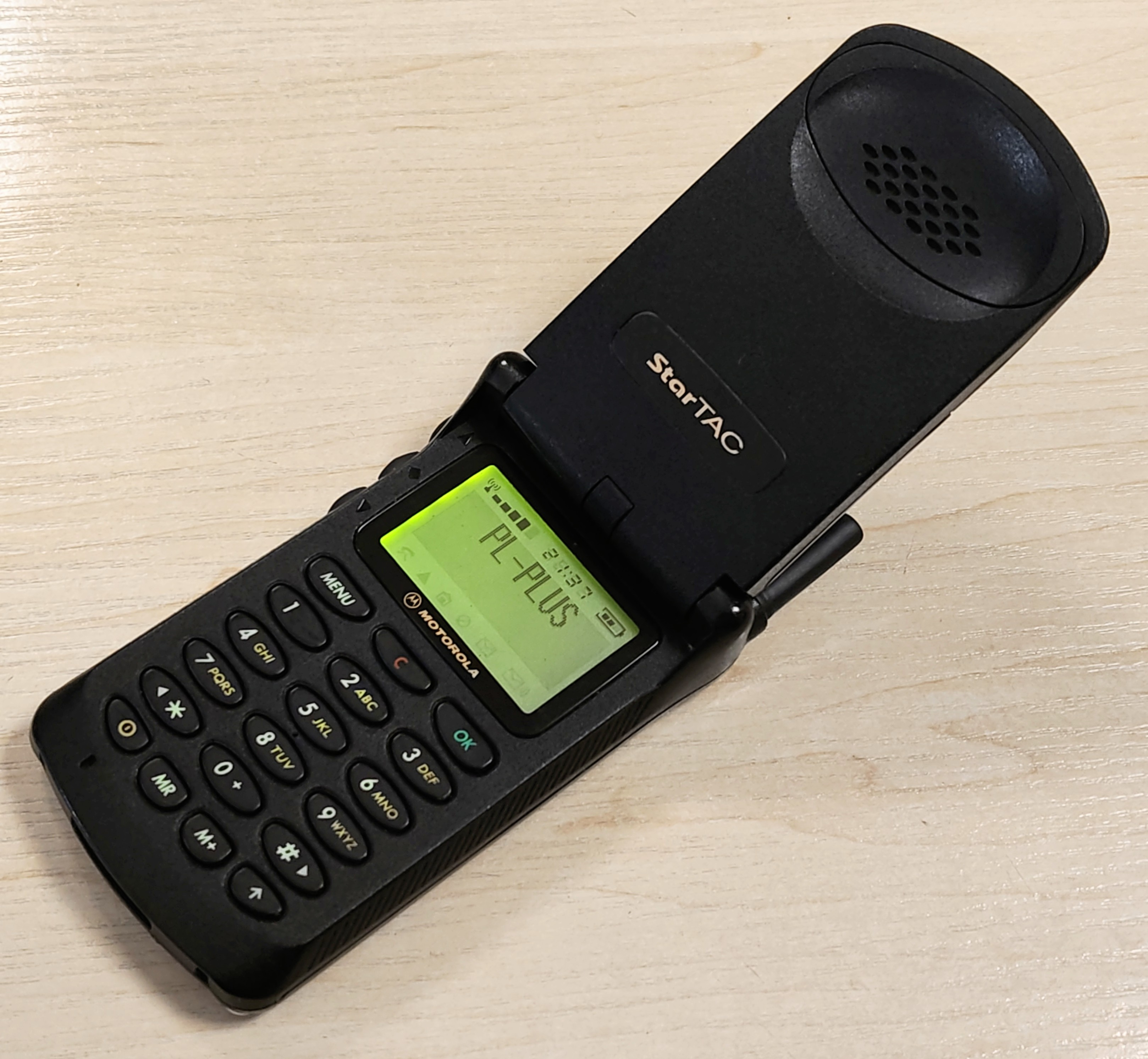
Motorola StarTAC 85

The StarTAC 80 series (80 and 85) is cosmetically identical to the 70 series models but have a higher resolution dot matrix displays, capable of displaying basic graphics like logos. StarTAC 100 is simply a configuration of the 80 sold with extra battery and desktop charger. The StarTAC C is a model for some Asian markets featuring Chinese language support. The StarTAC 8000g is the GSM PCS 1900 variant of the 80/85 for North America. StarTAC 338, 328C and 308C are models specific for China.

The StarTAC Royale is a variant of the 70 for the Mercury One2One network operator in the UK. Another UK network operator Orange released two StarTAC models; the MR501 and the MR701 that are variants of the 70/75 and 80/85 respectively but modified to operate on GSM 1800 instead of GSM 900, as well as including Orange branding and boot logos. The MR701 had minor cosmetic changes such as to the keypad and the phone displayed the Orange logo on bootup which it was able to do due to its higher resolution dot matrix display. It was common practice at the time for Orange to release their own variants of popular phones with different model names – in this case, "MR' refers to Motorola.

==== StarTAC Lite and J ====
The StarTAC Lite released in 1997 is a model based on the StarTAC 85 but without vibration and with a smaller battery to make it lighter, at 93.5 grams (3.30 oz) in its lightest configuration. Lite is the European model while StarTac J is the name as sold in territories including Hong Kong.

==== StarTAC 130 and X ====
The StarTAC 130 was announced at the 1998 CeBIT fair and was released as a GSM 900 phone. It weighs 87 grams (3.1 oz), with Motorola calling it the smallest and lightest GSM phone. The elimination of the full-sized (1FF) SIM card in favour of the mini SIM (2FF) helped reduce the length and thickness to be closer to that of the analog StarTACs. The 130 is the only GSM StarTAC along with the M6088 to use the mini-SIM. The cosmetically identical StarTAC X and Xe was sold in Asian and Australasian markets.

On the used market there are many 130 models that are sold as dual-band, operating on GSM 900 and 1800. These can be identified by the boot screen which will say "Motorola Dual Band". However, these are not genuine Motorola releases but are instead modified phones using a 130 housing, and the internals of a StarTAC M6088. The M6088 is an almost identical model to the 130. The phones differed slightly with the M6088 having a different silver housing, a fixed antenna and no rear contact points for accessories. However, both models use the same software and button layout. The internal PCB, keypad and LCD are interchangeable between the housings. With the exception of being dual-band and not working with rear-clip on accessories, the phones appear identical.

The 130 was popular with car manufacturers who were offering car phones and hands-free phones in their models. As such, models of the 130 can be found with automotive logos such as BMW, Mercedes and Jaguar. These would also often contain boot screens with their respective logos. These were otherwise identical in terms of hardware.

The Motorola M6088 was released circa 2001 (without the StarTAC name) as a dual band GSM 900 and 1800 model based on the 130/X.

==== StarTAC D ====
The StarTAC D was announced at CeBIT 1999 and is a GSM 900 model based on the StarTAC 85. It allowed users to make mobile payments. The rear slot usually reserved for a full-sized (1FF) SIM card would instead take an EMV debit card or credit card. This was possible as both 1FF SIM cards and debit/credit cards met the same ISO/IEC 7810 specifications. The phone accepted a mini SIM (2FF) card behind the battery for mobile cellular connectivity. The StarTAC D was the world's first dual-sim mobile phone. The StarTAC D was released following a partnership between Barclaycard and Cellnet in the UK, and also France Telecom and Cartes Bancaires in France.

A user could reload their debit card by inserting it into the phone and entering the withdrawal amount followed by a PIN code to load cash onto their card. In France, goods and services could be purchased by inserting the card into the slot and contacting the retailer. The price then appears on the screen and a password is entered to complete the transaction. Motorola eventually partnered with Giesecke & Devrient in Germany to offer similar services with their Geldkarte product.

== Legacy ==
In 2005, PC World named the StarTAC as the 6th Greatest Gadget of the Past 50 Years (out of a list of fifty).

In South Korea, the StarTAC series achieved "cult" status. It propelled the domestic company Samsung Electronics to develop their own clamshell phone, which was released in 1998, and Samsung would eventually become the main manufacturer of flip phones other than Motorola at the start of the 21st century.

The Motorola RAZR V3 is considered to be a spiritual successor.

=== In popular culture ===
The StarTAC has appeared in many Hollywood movies of the period such as 8mm starring Nicolas Cage.

=== Modern day use and customization ===
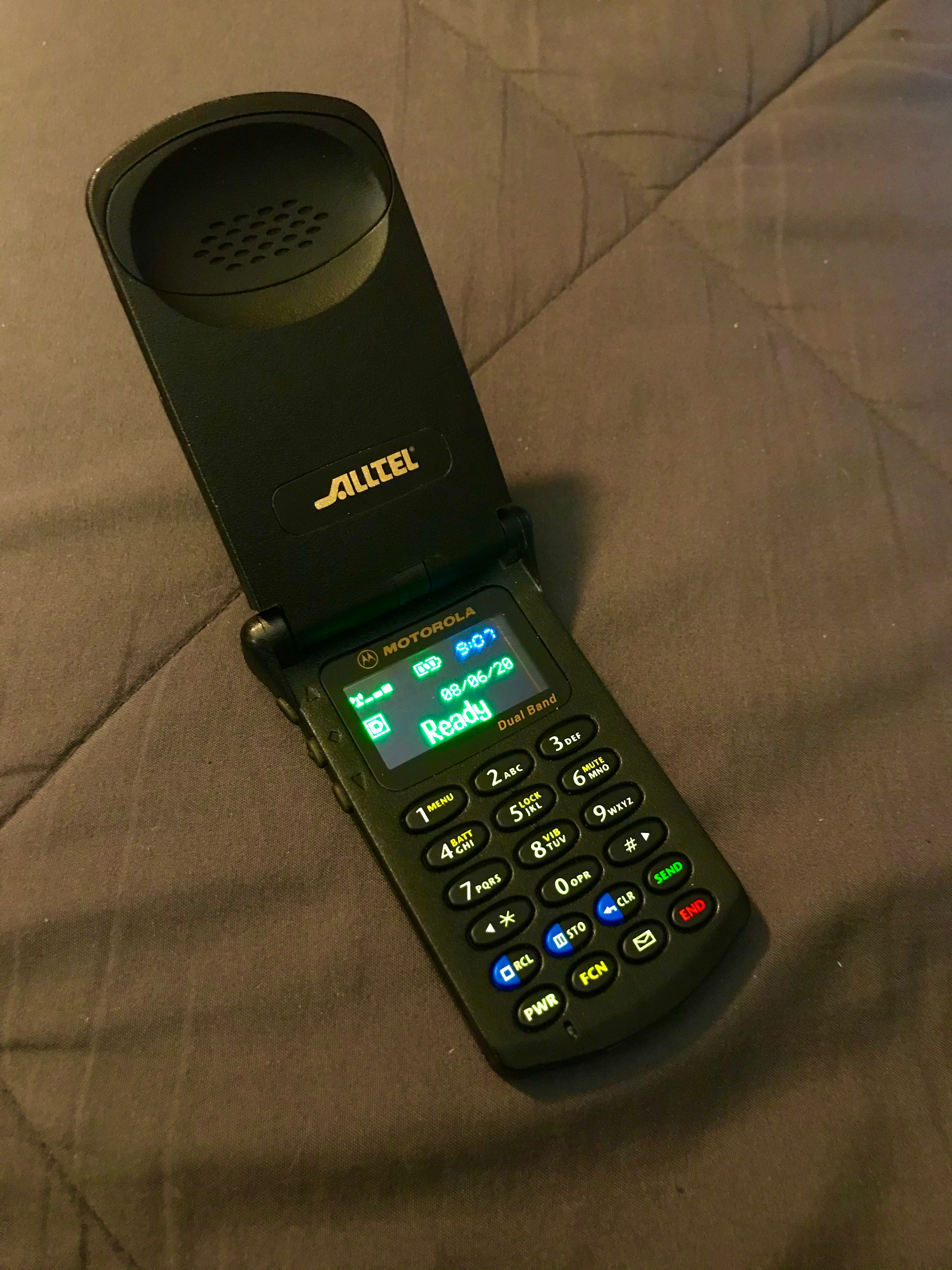
Customized StarTAC ST7868W with internals of a TimePort P8767

Due to the popularity of the StarTAC, it has gained a cult following by enthusiasts and vintage mobile phone collectors. Despite its age, many models can still be used to this day in regions where cellular providers still operate a compatible network. For the most part, this is limited to GSM models operating on the 2G network (and often these units will first need to be unlocked). Early models that used the analog AMPS network, and later digital models that used TDMA, are now obsolete due to the shutdown of these networks worldwide. CDMA models are still usable in countries where cdmaOne continues to operate, but this network has also recently become obsolete in the US. With many older cell providers now defunct, GSM StarTACs can be network unlocked using dedicated hardware such as a RoEMMI Box or a Motorola Emmi Clip. These devices are able to reprogram the EEPROM and set the SIM lock flag.

In October 2010, a French firm named Lekki, which refurbished iconic vintage products from the 1990s, released a line of refurbished StarTACs in new colourful bodies for €220 each.

=== Effect on Motorola ===
Despite being a hit product, the StarTAC was unable to reverse Motorola's growing troubles. The product's 'cool' factor eventually fizzled out because of rival products with better interfaces, notably offering 4 or 5 lines on the display that made it more intuitive for reading and writing text messages. While in 1996 when the StarTAC launched, mobile phone consumers were most often middle-aged men, by 1998 the fast changing market had widely diversified crossing age, sex and occupation. The StarTAC was not considered an attractive product to many of these new customers, whereas Nokia managed to develop attractive new mobile phones and regularly refreshed them, with Motorola falling behind Nokia in global sales in 1998.

Motorola was also slow at adopting digital cellular technologies compared to Nokia and Ericsson. The first CDMA and TDMA StarTACs did not have general availability in North America until 1999, and even the StarTAC's successor, the V series, launched initially analog only during a time when digital had long surpassed analog technology.

=== Revivals ===
==== StarTAC 2004 ====
Motorola revived the StarTAC in a reimagined, modern form, announced in 2004 for the South Korean market, where the original StarTAC had been extremely popular. Named StarTAC 2004, this is a CDMA model exclusive to SK Telecom and featured a 128×160 resolution TFT LCD color display, 64-channel sound, and a mobile banking feature supported by its carrier.

In addition, a version with an 18K gold directional keypad and brightwork was released as StarTAC 2004 SE in South Korea.

The regular edition was released (without the mobile banking function) as the CDMA Motorola V628 in China in early 2005.

==== StarTAC III ====
Motorola released another revival of the StarTAC, named StarTAC III (model no. MS900), announced on February 27, 2007 for the South Korean market. This model has a 2-inch QVGA display, 128 MB built-in memory, MP3 audio support and GPS location.

==== Cordless phone ====
Later, a cordless DECT phone was released bearing the StarTAC name, called the StarTAC S1201.

== See also ==
- Motorola MicroTAC – predecessor
- Star Trek Communicator (1964) – design precursor
- Grillo telephone (1965) – design precursor
- Motorola V phone – further miniaturized flip phone
- Samsung A100 and Samsung 800 – another early flip phone
- Mobile Phone Museum
