= Motorola Profile 300e =

Mobile phone

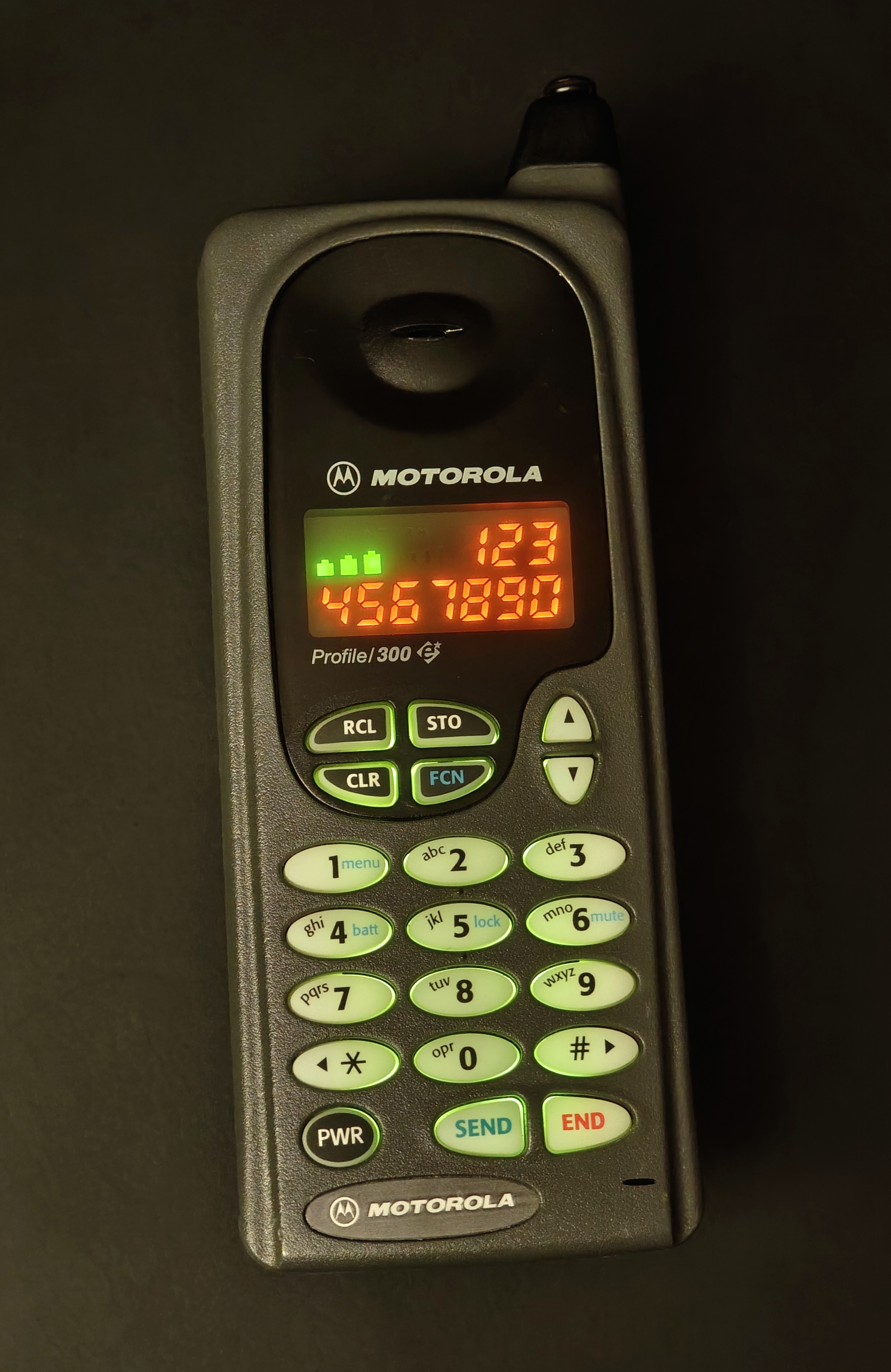
Motorola Profile 300e, analog AMPS cellular telephone.

The Motorola Profile 300e is a mobile phone that was released by Motorola in c. 1997. The Profile has the MicroTAC's battery and antenna. The "e" at the end of the name means that it had all of the special features as well as extended display. The phone had a "slim" 6V Nickel-Metal Hydride battery and a regular battery. With the slim battery, the phone was about an inch thick. It had a built-in antenna that was 5 inches long. For making calls, the phone had a SND button, and to end calls it had an end button. The Profile was one of the first cell phones that had a passcode lock. The Profile was not a very popular cell phone.

== Hardware ==
Other buttons on the Profile 300e were: RCL, STO, CLR, FCN, and up and down buttons for volume.

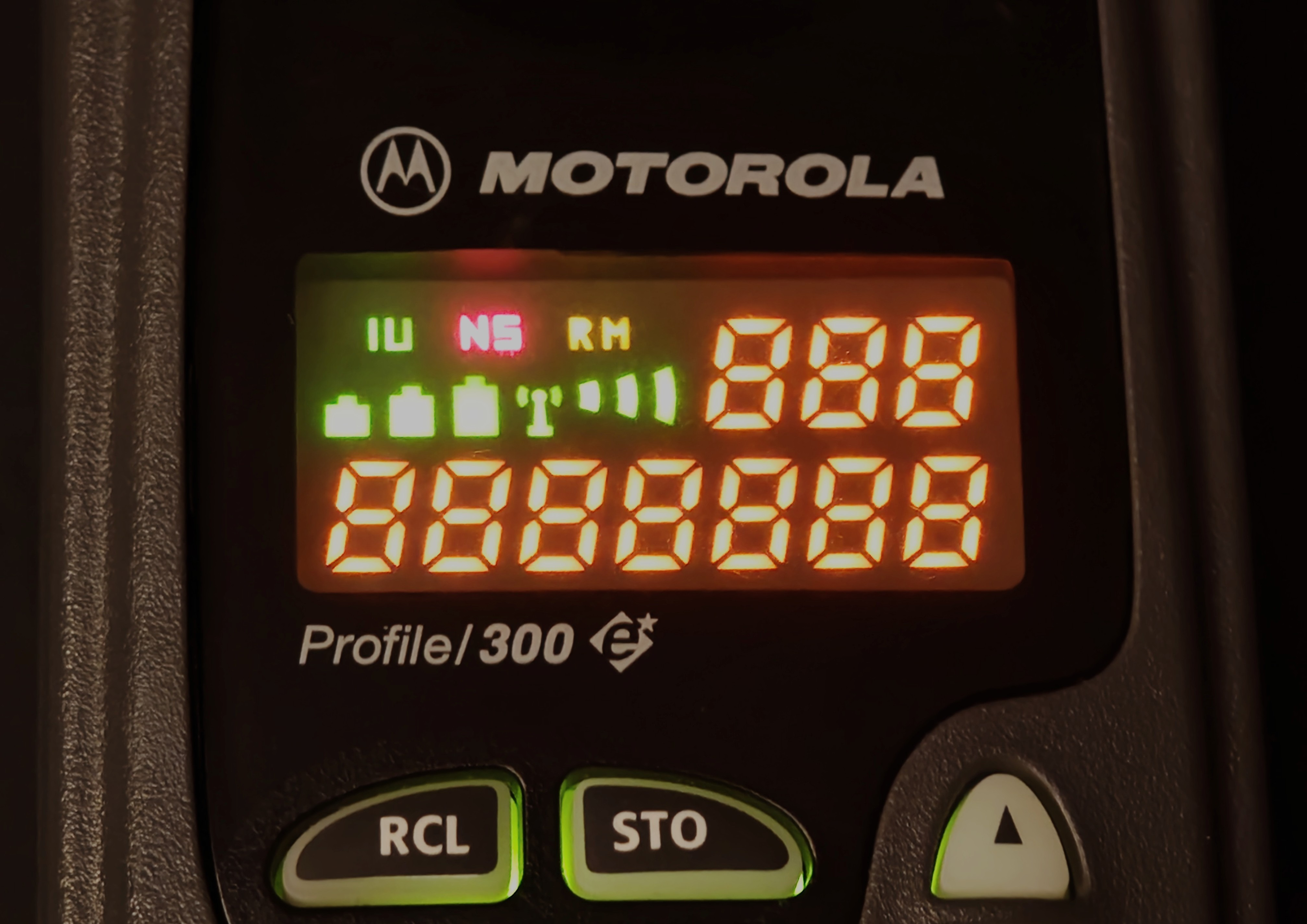
Motorola Profile 300e - close-up of the display.

The Profile 300e has an LED Display with 3 signal icons, 3 battery icons, an NS icon (No Service), an IU icon (In Use), and RM (Roaming). It had a 10-number display. When the phone was turned on, the screen would simply say "On". If the phone was locked it would say "Loc'd". When the phone was locked, the code was a 3-digit number—by default 1-2-3, or if not, the last three digits in the phone's number.

== Features ==
The phone has 9 optional ringtones, an auto lock function, multikey answer (so you could answer with any key), a special emergency call option, an Auto Answer function (after two rings the phone would automatically answer itself), and several other features common on older Motorola phones.
