= MicroTAC =

Cellular phone series by Motorola

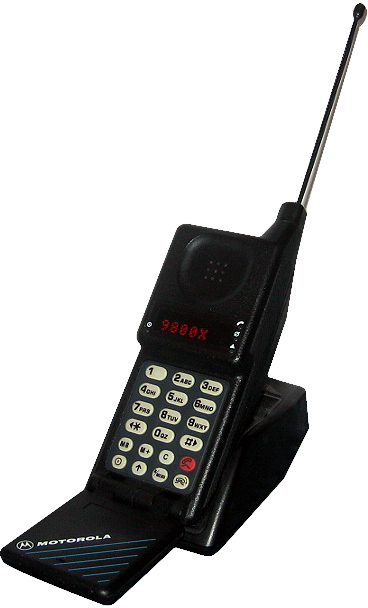
- The Motorola MicroTAC 9800X; the first of many MicroTAC models produced over nearly a decade.
- Manufacturer: Motorola
- First released: 1989; 37 years ago
- Predecessor: DynaTAC
- Successor: TeleTAC; StarTAC
- Compatible networks: Advanced Mobile Phone System or GSM on Ameritech
- Form factor: Flip
- Data inputs: Push-button
- Made in: USA

The MicroTAC is a series of cellular phones that was marketed by Motorola from 1989 until approximately 2000. The MicroTACs pioneered a new "flip" design in cellular handsets that was considered innovative and more compact compared to previous "brick" phones, such as Motorola's own DynaTAC line.

The MicroTAC's design consisted of the "mouthpiece" being folded over the keypad. On later production models the "mouthpiece" was actually located in the base of the phone, along with the ringer. This set the standard and became the model for later clamshell design phones, which Motorola adopted in the StarTAC in 1996.

The first MicroTAC model was released for analog networks. In 1994, GSM-compatible and TDMA/Dual-Mode versions were introduced, followed by a CDMA-compatible version in 1997.

== Early models ==
=== MicroTAC 9800X ===
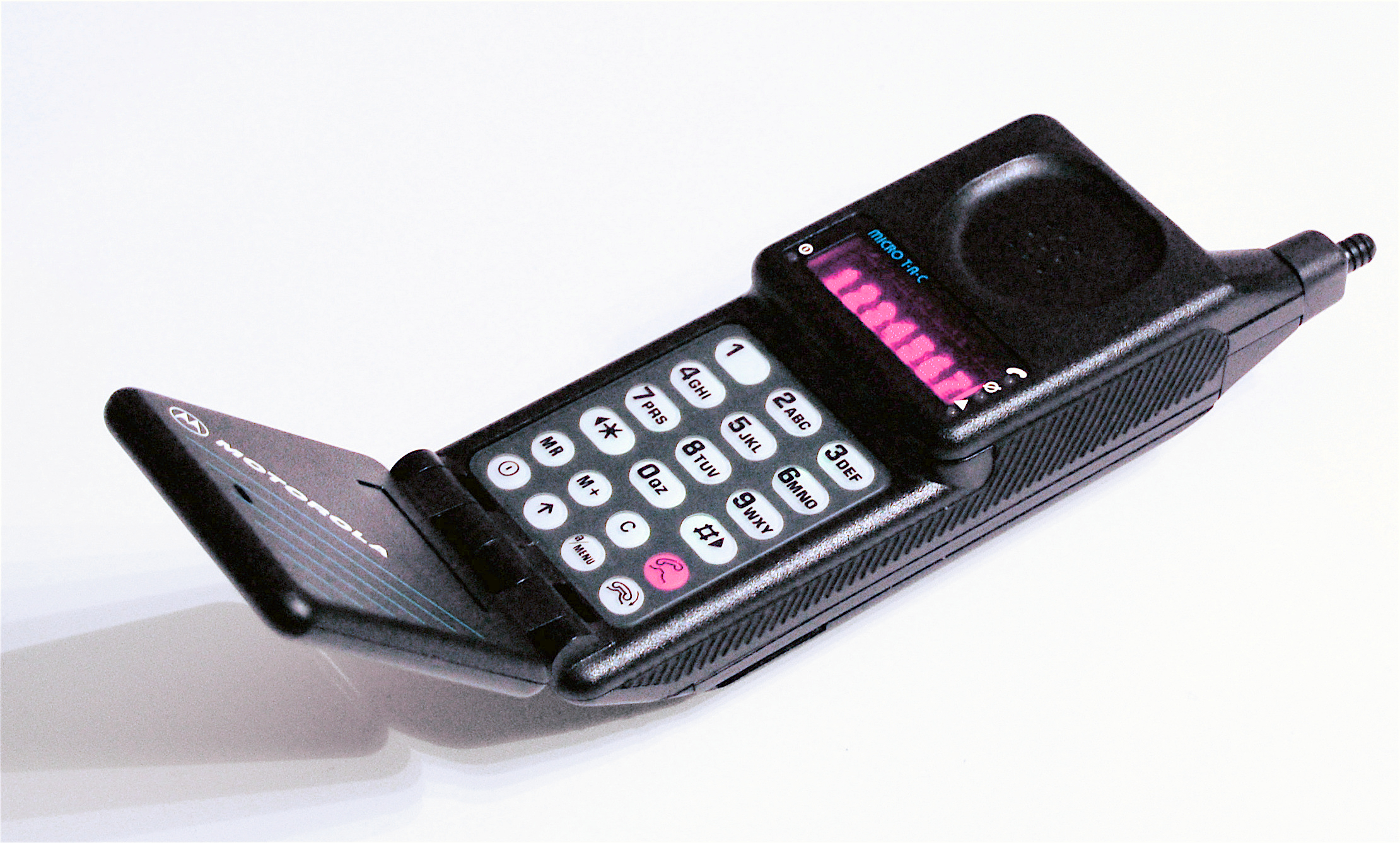
The MicroTAC 9800X phone from 1989 was the ETACS standard.

The MicroTAC, released by Motorola on April 25, 1989, was the smallest and lightest phone available at the time. Upon its release, it made headlines across the world. The phone was released as the "MicroTAC Pocket Cellular Telephone." The first MicroTACs were known as the Motorola 9800X, a continuation of the numerical name Motorola gave their phones in the 1980s. The MicroTAC was designed to fit into a shirt pocket. These very rare phones featured a black plastic housing and a red 8-character dot-matrix LED display, which was able to show more information than the display of its predecessor, the Motorola DynaTAC 8000X. However, dot-matrix displays of the time were still quite limited by today's standards. The inside of the flip piece had the "Motorola" logo on a diagonal, above thin blue diagonal lines. The badge on the front flip had a raised metallic Motorola logo, and "Micro T.A.C" in small blue letters above the display. The "micro" sized phone measured as long as over 9 inches (23 cm) long when open and weighed in 12.3 ounces (350 g) with the slim battery. The phone incorporated a built-in alpha-numeric phone book as one of the many standard features. A numerically organized menu allowed the user to select options for phone operations. Some of the many options included security codes, two phone number operations, a charge rate and currency calculator, secretarial memory scratchpads, hands-free operation, keypad tones, memory protection, phone number and name storage, as well as cellular system operation options.

In addition to the standard 12-button keypad, the MicroTAC had buttons for Power, Function, Name/Menu, End, Send, Clear, Store, and Recall. The left side of the phone featured two buttons for adjusting the volume up and down. While in alpha mode, the volume buttons toggled between upper-case and lower-case text. The model sold for between U.S. $2,495 and U.S. $3,495, and was produced into the early 1990s before being replaced by newer versions.

Several variants of the 9800X existed, most notably models that featured a 10-character alpha-numeric liquid crystal display (LCD), which had a green backlight. These uncommon variants were made for the Norwegian Storno and Italian SIP networks in the early 1990s. The Storno variants operated on NMT-450 and the SIP models were of the ETACS/RTMS-450 Dual Band. They kept the "MicroTAC" Blue logo on the screen, the same black housing, but had different metallic badges in addition to the LCD.

The original models can be distinguished by their elongated antenna base, white-translucent keys and gray keypad background. Accessories for the phone included car, desktop and overnight travel chargers, installed hands-free car kits, leather cases, and a selection of batteries. The slimmest battery then available was the Slim and Slim Extended (Life), followed by the Standard, XT, and Talk-Pak XT batteries. The Talk-Pak XT and XT used Nickel Metal-Hydride while the others used Nickel Cadmium. A Lithium Ion battery was introduced in 1994.

The early 9800X-era MicroTACs were the only phones to have the microphone and ringer in the mouthpiece. These components were moved to the main phone body in all other models.

=== Digital Personal Communicator ===
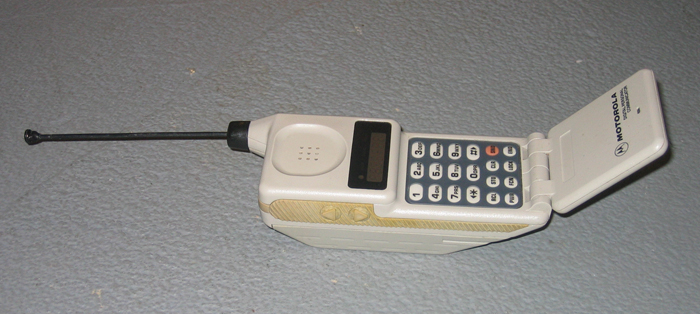
MicroTAC Digital Personal Communicator was made to be less expensive than the 9800X.

In 1989, the Digital Personal Communicator, or DPC, was introduced as a lower cost alternative to the 9800X. Light or dark gray in color, the phone featured a green or orange 7-character segment LED display. It closely resembled the 9800x in terms of the keypad design and background and the main body. Early DPCs of the 9800X-era featured the elongated antenna base, round-top side grips, and white-on-gray keypad. Later versions (most likely after 1991) lost the 9800X-specific physical features, but kept the same basic form. Bone white models were also available as special editions to cellular providers in the US. An upscale version of the DPC, known as the MicroTAC 950, or the MicroTAC Alpha in later years featured an 8-character green or orange dot-matrix LED display and the return of the alpha-numeric phonebook. The Alpha phones were "upscale" in that they had more user-programmable options. Also, Alpha phones featured the side grip arrow keys. Soon, an "affordable" DPC 550 came to the market. Almost identical to the Digital Personal Communicator, the DPC 550 featured little with the most basic of operations.

== Lite, Classic, II and Elite models ==
=== MicroTAC Lite and the Ultra Lite ===
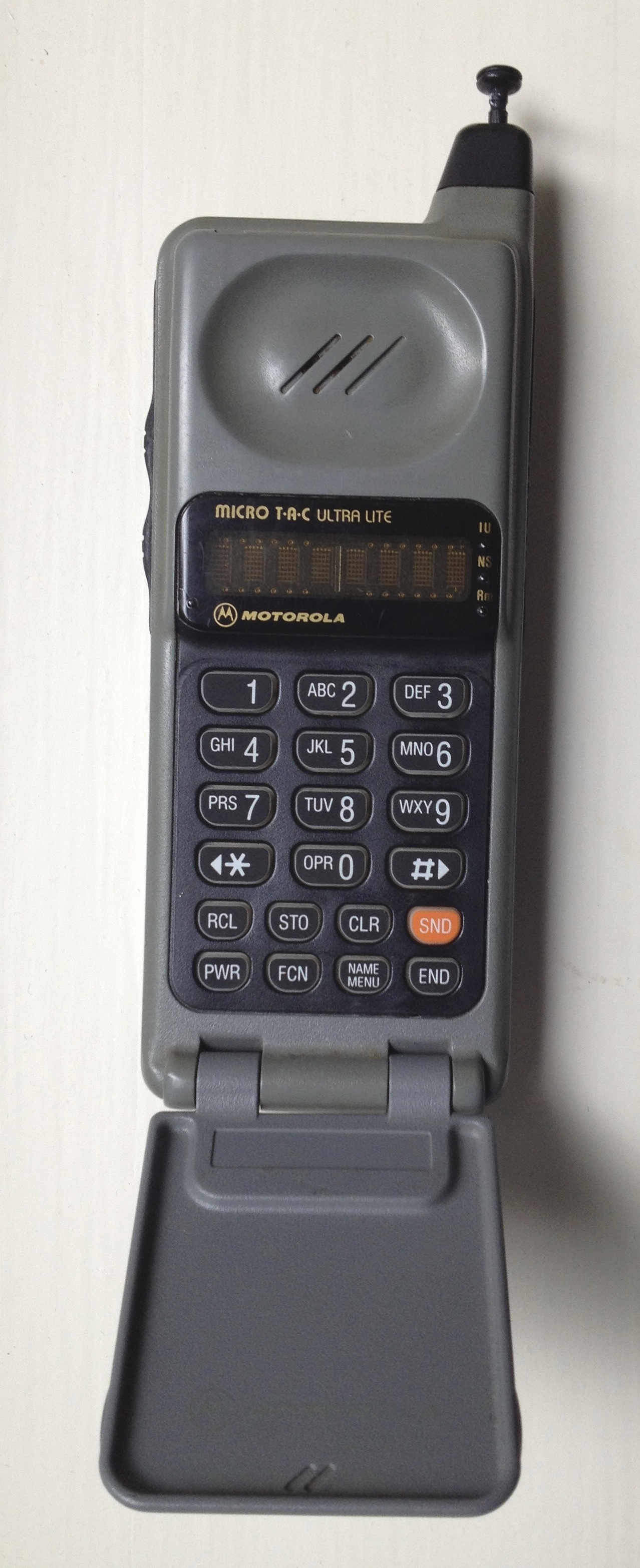
MicroTAC Ultra Lite.

On August 6, 1991, the MicroTAC Lite was introduced at 7.7 ounces (220 g). The Lite was the lightest phone available, continuing the record of the 9800X. It was essentially a slimmer version of the Alpha. Another model, the Lite XL, was released around this time. It had a single-line green LED display and three Memory Location keys added. The Lite was quickly followed by the MicroTAC Ultra Lite, announced on September 9, 1992. This phone had a longer battery life and was lighter, weighing 5.9 ounces (170 g), again holding the new record for the lightest phone available. This was due to it being the first phone that utilized NiMH batteries, although replacement batteries were often NiCDs because NiMHs were very expensive. The Ultra Lite was also the first phone with a vibrating ringer.

=== MicroTAC Classic ===
In 1991, Motorola released the MicroTAC Classic which resembled the 1989 model, weighing in at 6.9 ounces (200 g). Several changes were carried over from the MicroTAC Lite: the antenna base was shortened, the red LED display was dropped for a 10-character LCD, and the keys were changed from white to black. The phone was available on the ETACS network. There was a single-band GSM model available in the UK that took credit-card sized SIM cards. The Classic had the same "Motorola" over blue diagonal lines on the inside of the flip, but lost the metallic front badge and blue lettering.

=== MicroTAC II ===
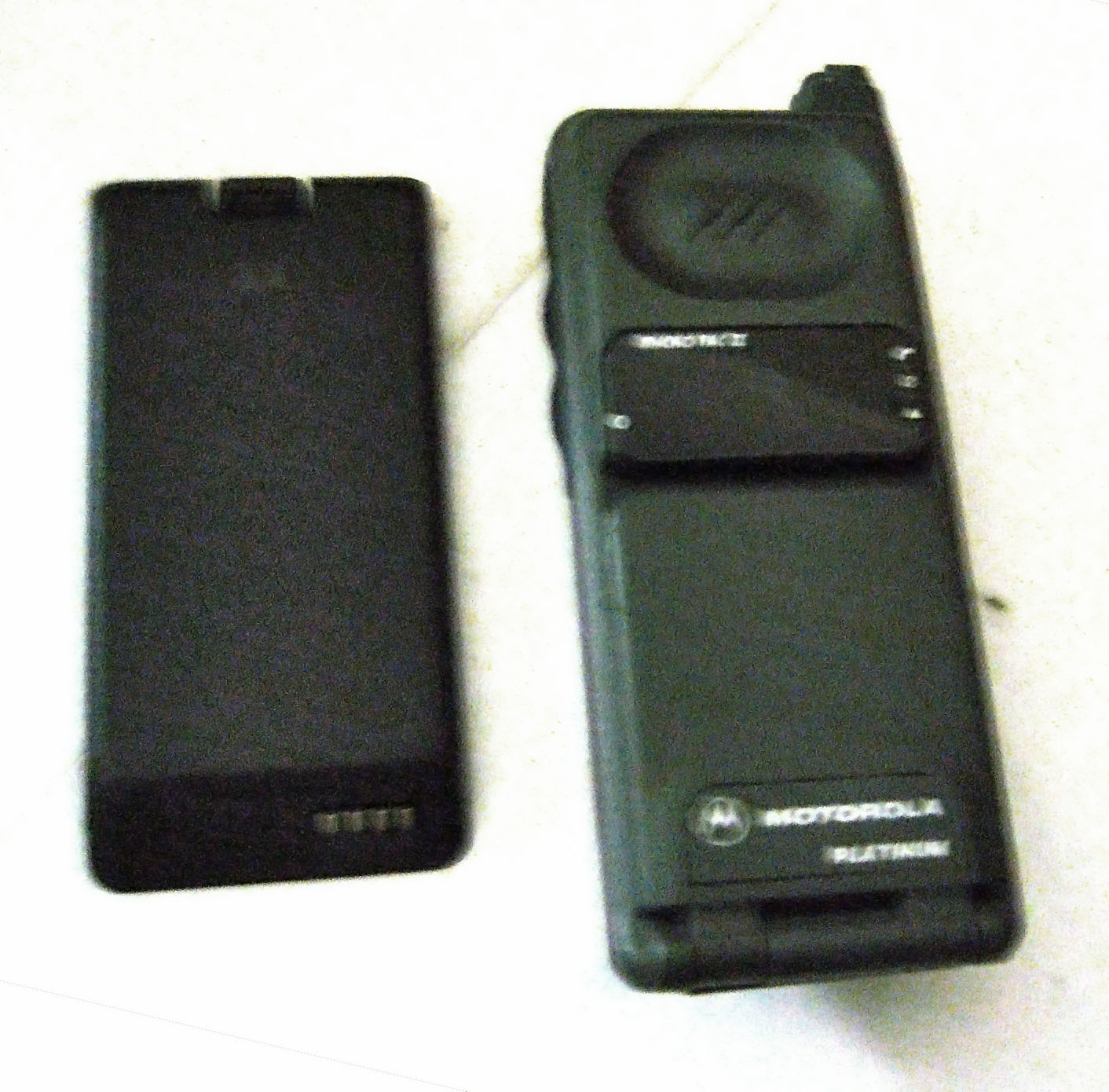
A grey example of the MicroTAC II, as sold in Asia. This one comes with the Ultra Lite's volume buttons and side grip.

In 1991, the MicroTAC Lite was simultaneously released in some markets (including Asia) as the MicroTAC II. Several models were produced in different versions for different networks, including AMPS, ETACS, NMT, and JTACS. Some of these models (presumably the newer ones) share volume buttons and a rubber side grip with the later Ultra Lite model.

The phones shipped with either a green backlit single-line LCD or a red dot matrix LED display.

=== MicroTAC Elite ===
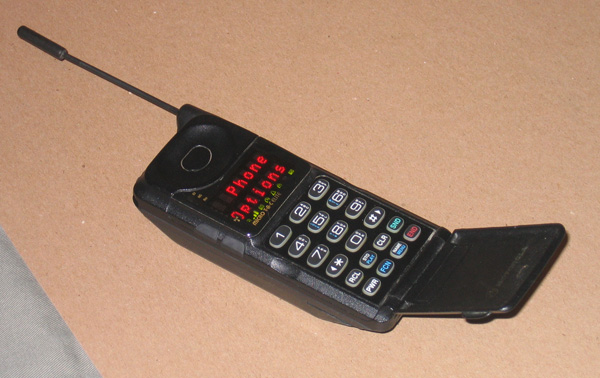
MicroTAC Elite VIP, 14-character orange LED display and menu icons

June 1994 saw the introduction of the MicroTAC Elite and the "International" series, the then smallest and lightweight model available at the time. It weighed in at a mere 3.9 ounces (110 g) with the slim battery. The Elite was a function of NAMPS technology from 1993. The Elite was also produced in a rare MicroTAC Elite VIP (pictured), which had a black housing, gold lettering, and an orange LED display, over the ordinary Elite, which had a gray housing, a green LED display, and white lettering. The Elite series was a feature-packed phone and retailed for around $600. The phone included a first-ever two line display, for a total of 14 dot-matrix characters. There were also separate LED indicator meters for signal strength and battery, as well as a Menu Icon Display. The phone's software offered advanced menu features, and each category, when accessed, was indicated with green icons at the bottom of the display. Categories included Phone Book, Timers, Security, Tone Control, Phone Options, and Answering Machine / Messaging. This was the first mobile phone to have a built-in, recordable answering machine. It was also the first mobile phone to use a lithium-ion battery.

== Digital and later models ==
=== International GSM ===
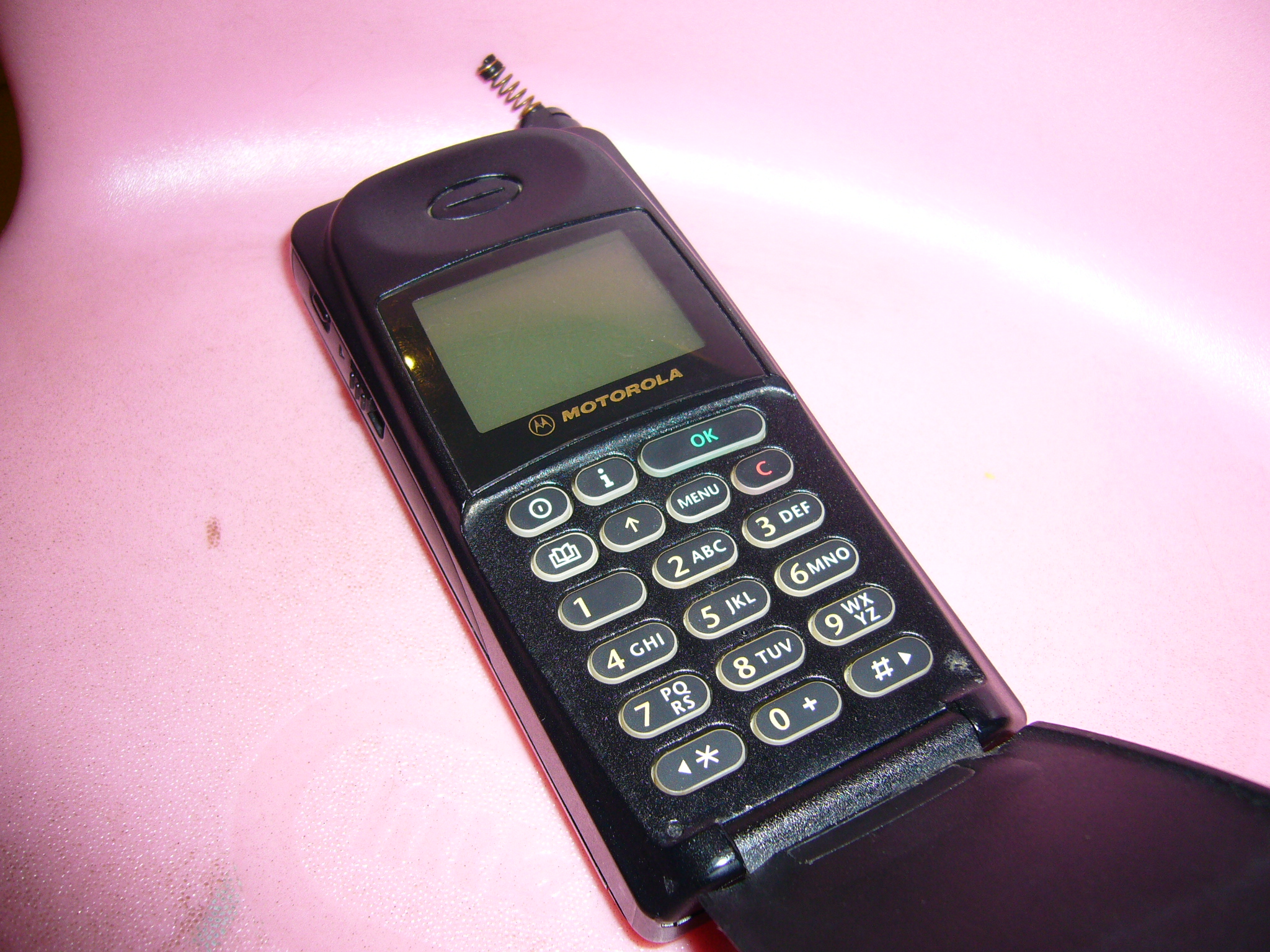
1994 International 8700

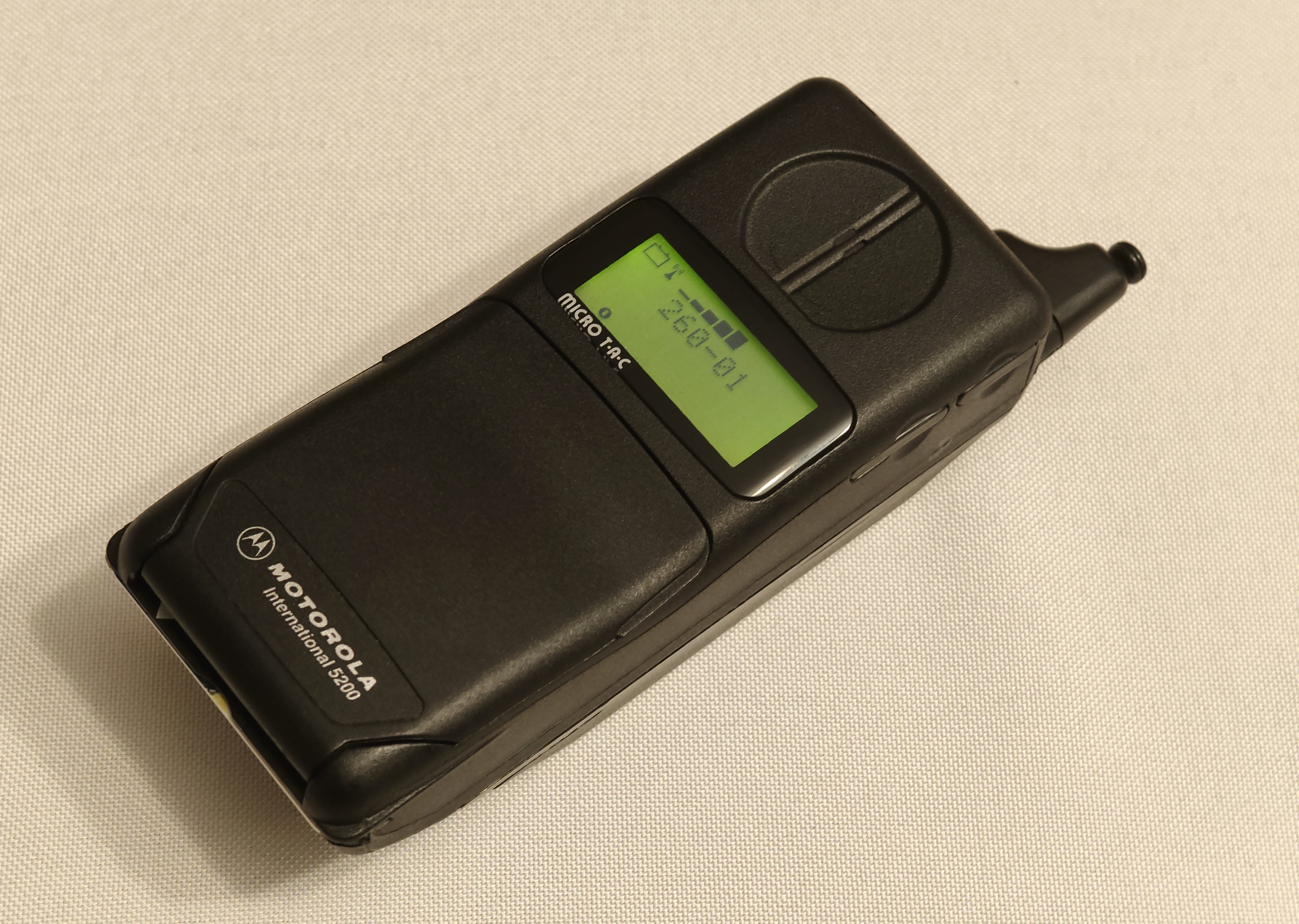
Motorola International 5200 (GSM 900)

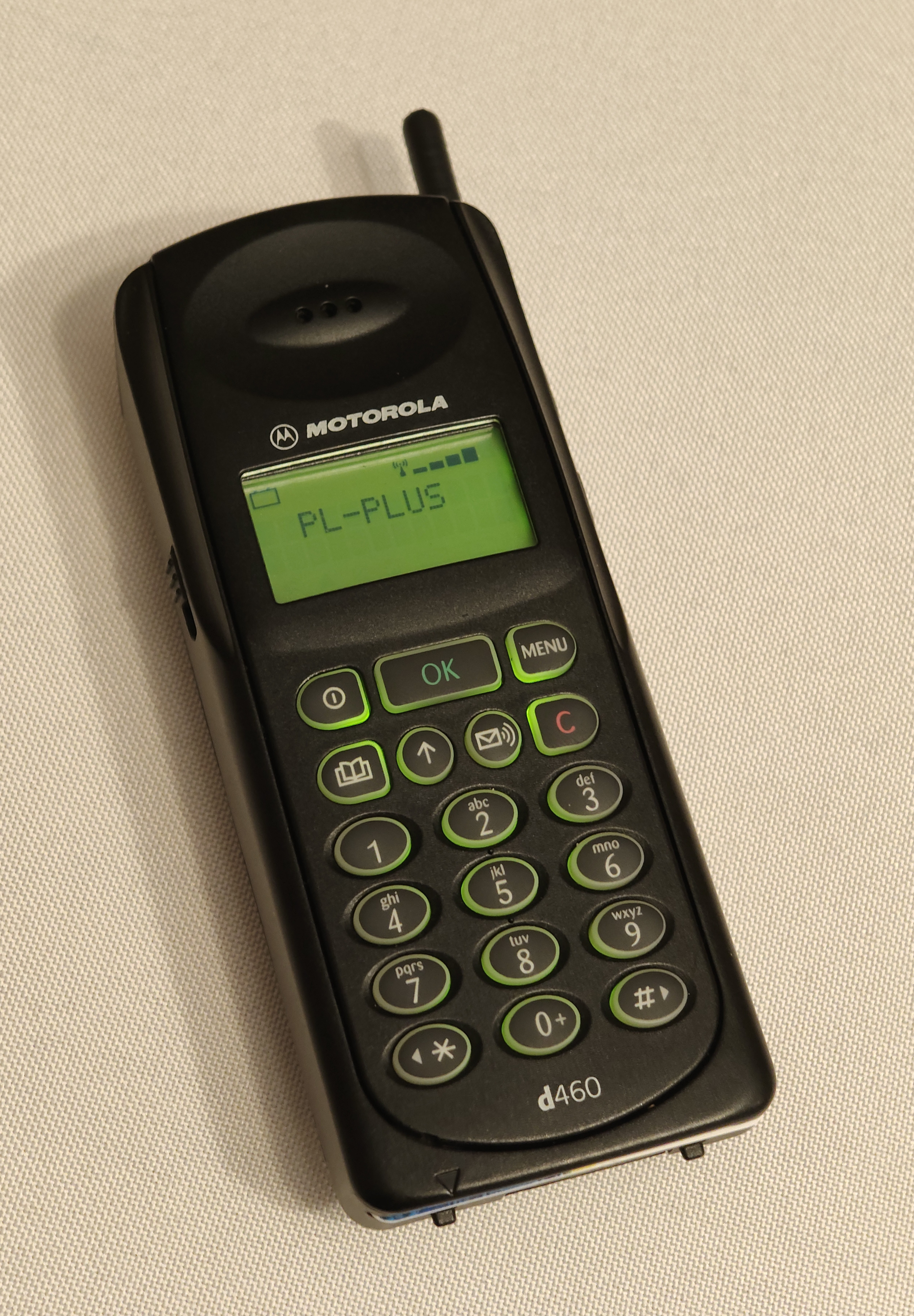
Motorola d460 (GSM 900)

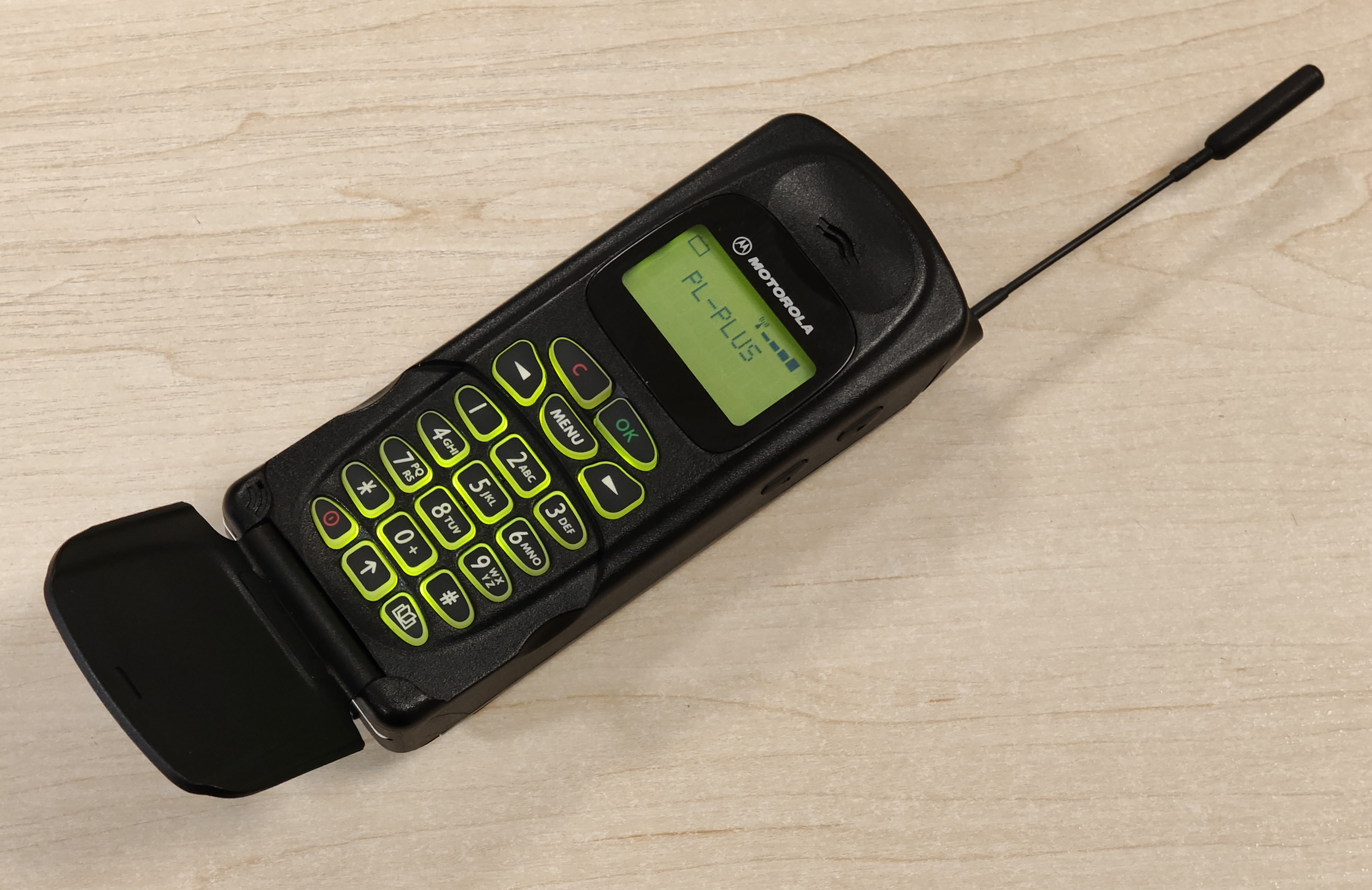
Motorola d470 (GSM 900).

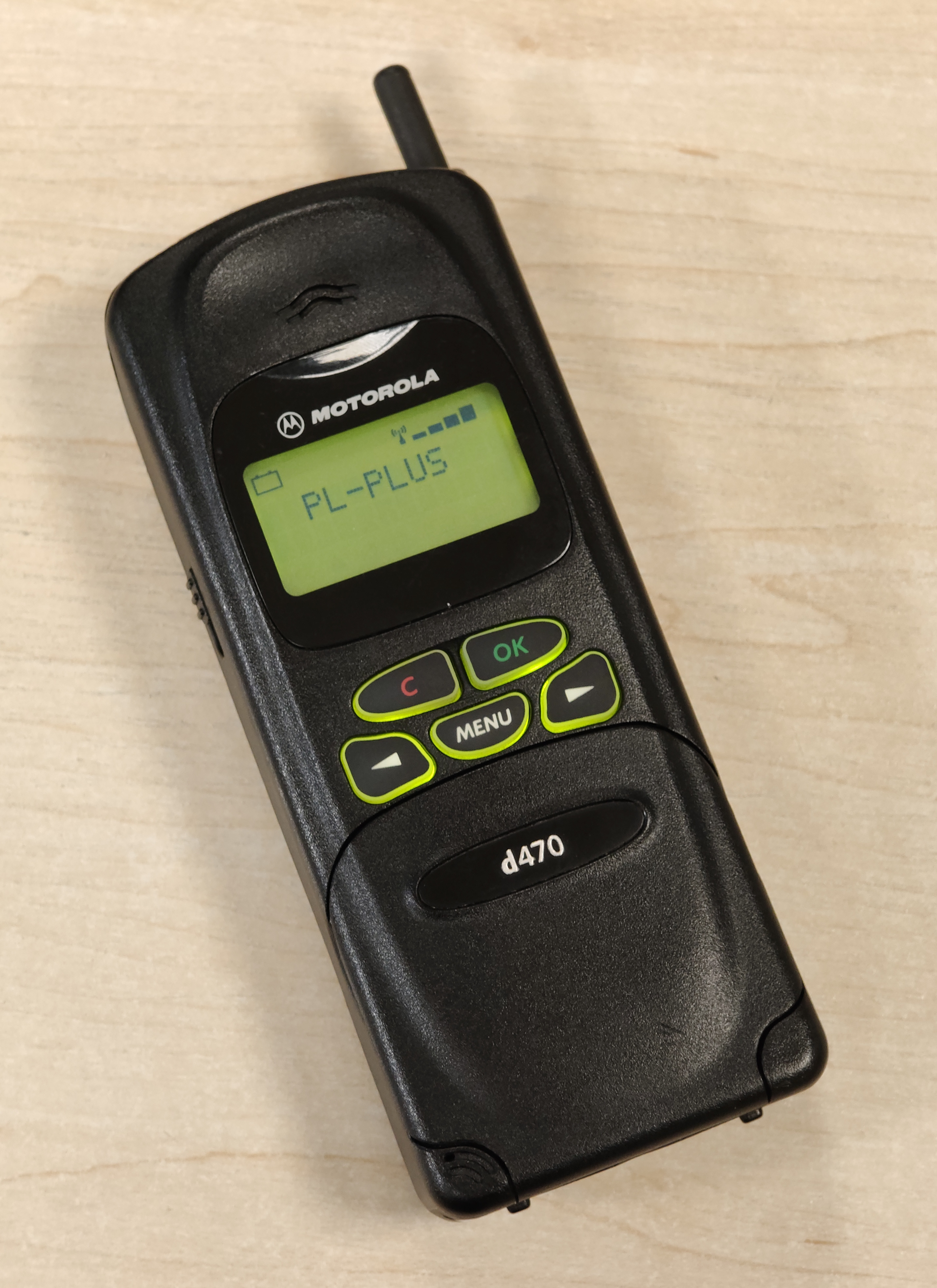

A series of GSM models was produced beginning in 1994, mostly in the UK, such as the International 5200, International 7500, and the International 8400, all running on the GSM 900 network. Many of these models are functionally identical but feature cosmetic differences or software upgrades.

The International 8700, introduced on November 27, 1996, was fitted as a removable handset in the earliest Jaguar XK8 and Jaguar XKR luxury sports coupes and convertibles, and selected BMW models up to the end of 1998.

With design underpinnings from the 8700, the dual-band International 8800 and 8900 (also known as the DB890) models were launched in 1997 and 1998 respectively. At the time of its launch, the International 8800 was the first cellular phone to work on both GSM 900 and 1800 bands. The International 8800 was rebadged for the Orange network as the Orange mr601 model.

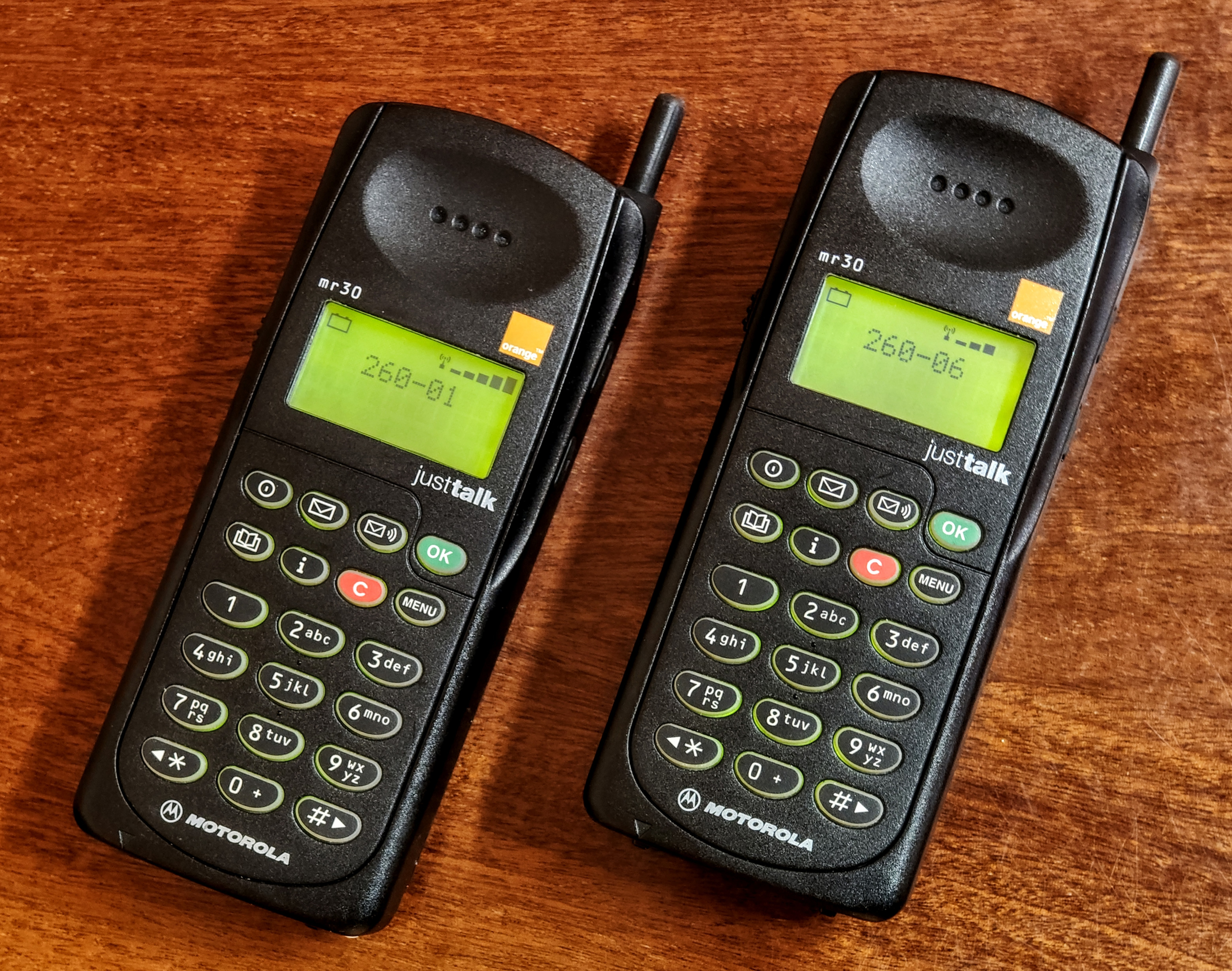
Motorola mr30 (DCS 1800)

The success of their analogue microTAC handset blinded Motorola to the implications of the emerging GSM standard. This allowed Nokia to secure a competitive advantage with the Nokia 1011 that was released in 1992, a full two years ahead of the GSM version of the MicroTAC. This left only their Motorola International 3200 "brick" in the GSM market to compete with the Nokia 1011. Many in the industry regard this as the turning point in an industrial cellular landscape that Motorola had historically controlled.

=== US digital models ===
Several digital models were produced for the US markets. One was the short-lived Micro DIGITAL model that operated on the AMPS and TDMA networks, and was similar in appearance to the Alpha model. The MicroTAC Lite was also available for the TDMA network. The other was the MicroTAC Select 6000e, with a design based on the International 8700. The Select models had large-format backlit LCDs, similar to those found on the MicroTAC 3000e and A725, which operated on CDMA networks.

In September 1996, Motorola introduced the MicroTAC SC-720, the first commercial CDMA 800 handset. In March 1997, the SC-925 was released as Motorola's first CDMA 1900 phone. February 1998 saw the release of MicroTAC SC-725.

=== Lite II/XL ===
The MicroTAC Lite II and Lite XL were announced on December 4, 1995. They were designed for use with a Hearing Aid Telephone Interconnect System (HATIS). Updated versions of the Lite II and Lite XL were introduced in February 1998.

=== MicroTAC 650/650E and decline ===
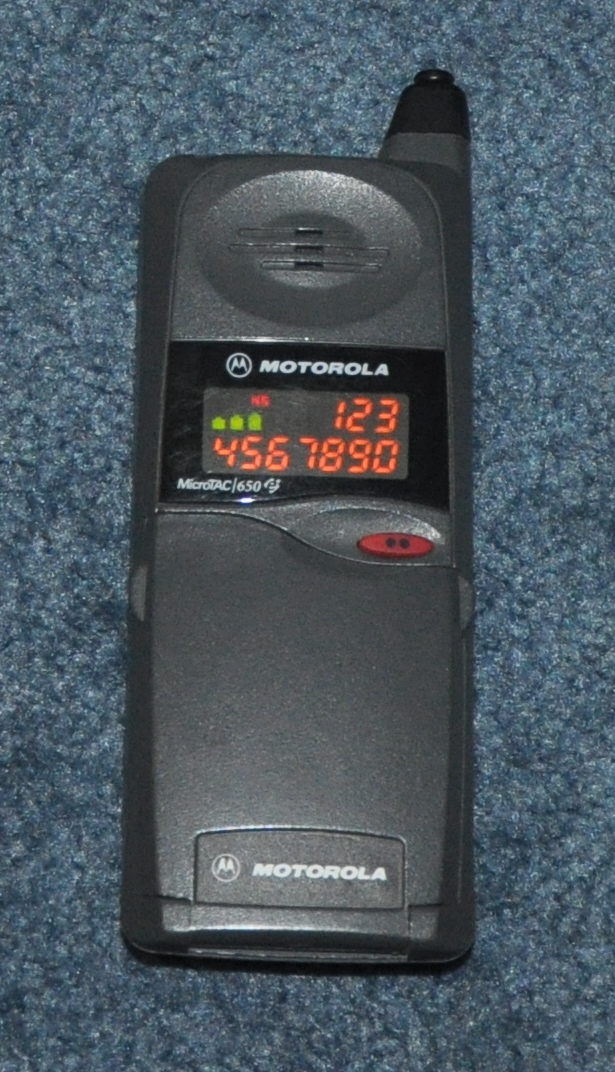
MicroTAC 650e

In 1996, the diminutive Motorola StarTAC was released, which provided fierce competition for MicroTAC. The phone received a redesign in 1996, with a more rounded case and thinner flip-lid. Two Memory Location keys were added to the phone. Base models were known as the DPC 650, which kept the 550's display. A more expensive model, the MicroTAC DPC 650E received the StarTAC 3000's 10-character LED display with separate battery and signal meters. It weighed 7.8 ounces (220 g). Like the StarTAC, the MicroTAC 650E ("E" for Enhanced Features) received some feature upgrades, such as selectable ringer styles, but lost the alpha-numeric phonebook. The 650E was available in gray or black. The 650E was one of the better selling models in the US, along with the Elite and DPC 550. The MicroTAC was produced up until 1998, when sales declined with the increasing popularity of the StarTAC. The phone was still relatively commonplace into the early 2000s. However, due to its large size and weight, many owners of the phone upgraded to smaller models like the StarTAC.

=== VIP models ===
Many MicroTAC models were available with the upscale VIP option. VIP phones were black with gold lettering, had a dark orange dot-matrix LED display (only 9800X models had a true red display) and additional menu features. Lites, Ultra-Lites, Lite IIs, Lite XLs, Elites, and Alphas were all available as VIP phones.

== Related phones ==
=== CipherTAC ===
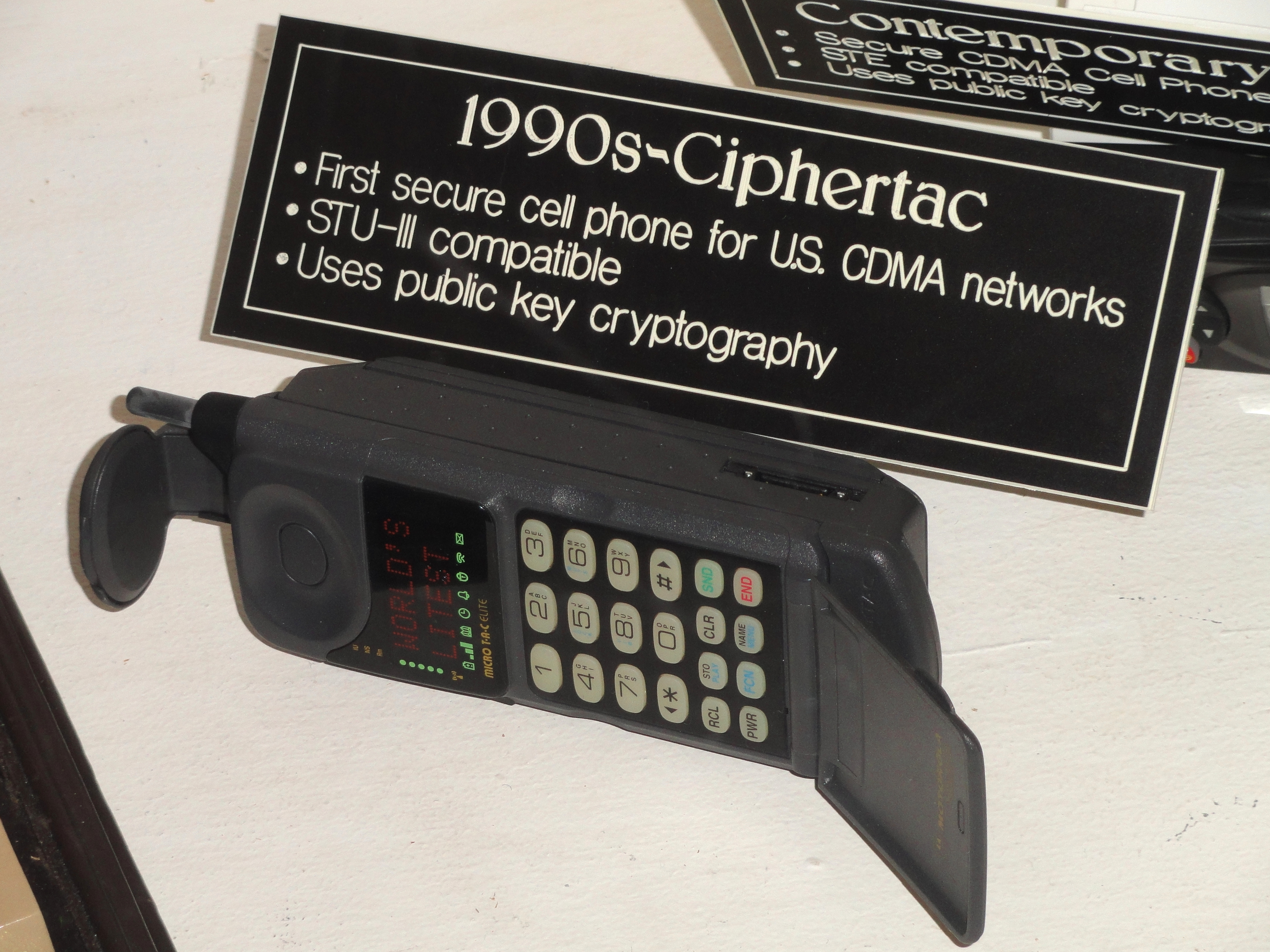
A CipherTAC.

The CipherTAC was a spin-off of the MicroTAC series, running on the CDMA network. Introduced in 1996, it offered unrecoverable, encrypted communication and was purpose-built in 1998 for the Secretary of State (then Madeleine Albright) and other officials. It was not made available for mainstream use. The fate of these units is currently unknown; presumably most of them would have been destroyed for security reasons but at least one example survives as a museum exhibit.

Design-wise, the CipherTAC took after the Elite VIP.

=== Similar models ===
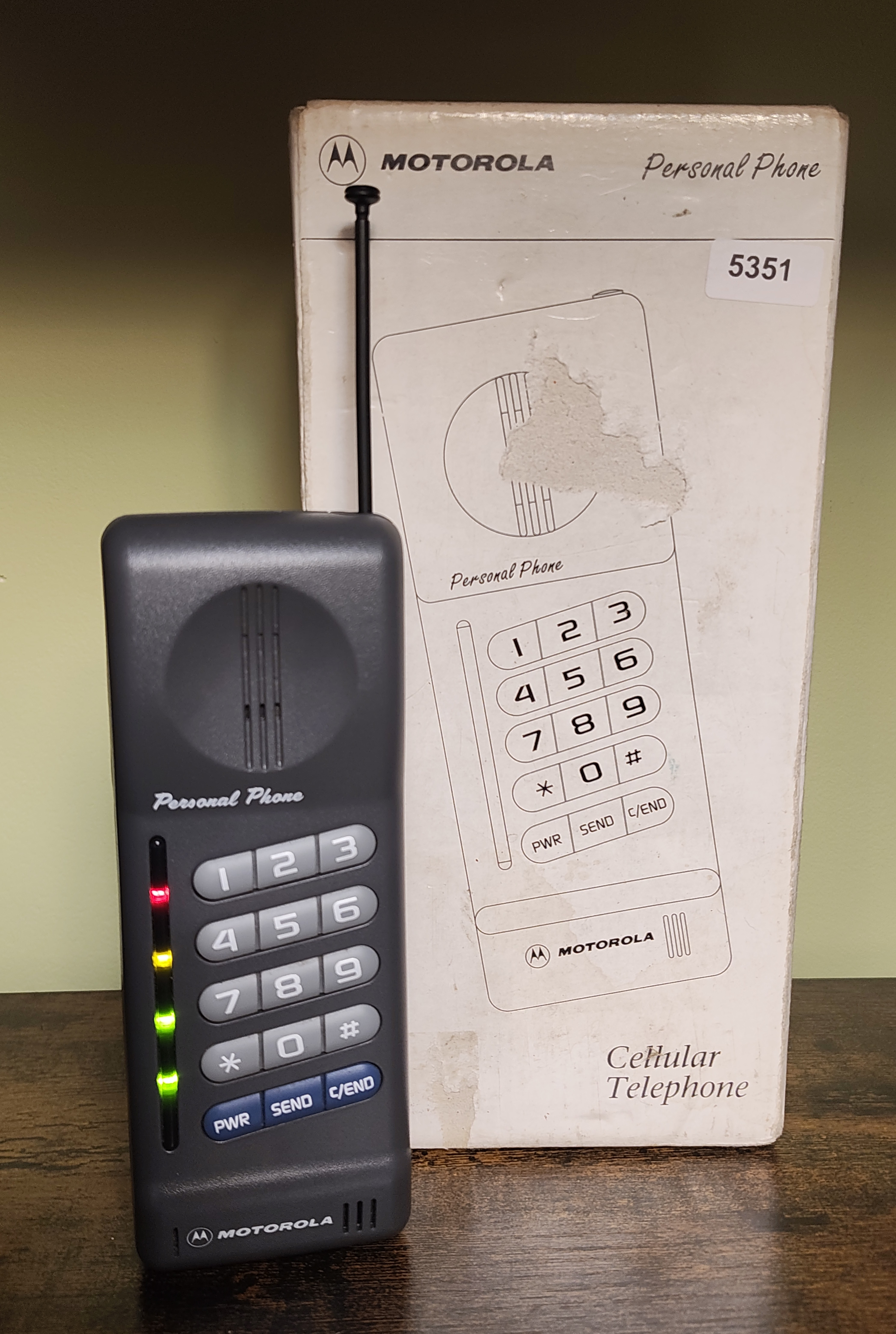
Motorola Personal Phone (ETACS), an extremely simplified cellular telephone based on the MicroTAC.

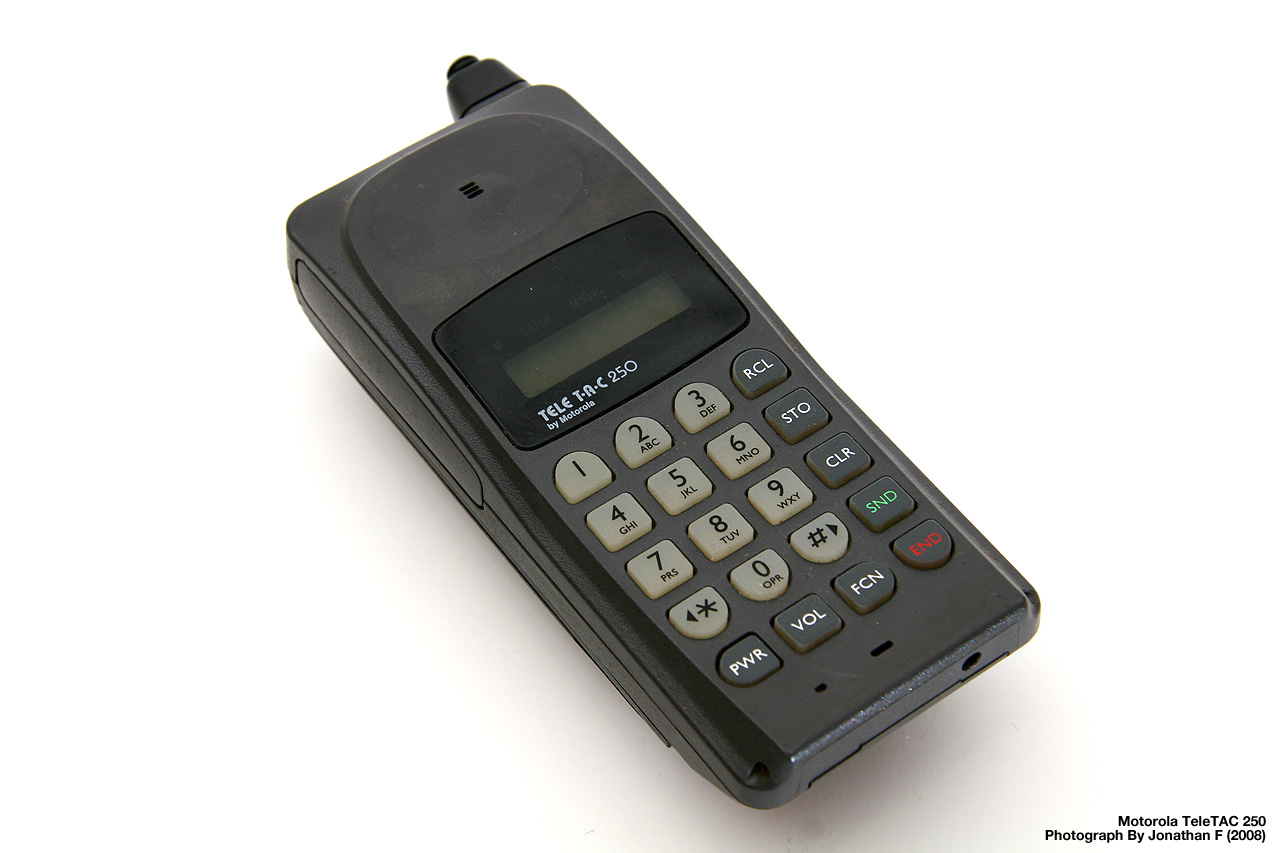
TeleTAC 250

The MicroTAC body was also used as the base model for Motorola's TeleTAC and Flare series. The TeleTAC and Flare phones used the same core body, antenna, screen, keypad, and batteries, but lacked the flip-lid cover. The MicroTAC 650E lost the flip and Memory Location keys and gained arrow keys to become the Profile 300E. This Profile 300e phone was also called Metro1, the model on the sticker was S7956A and featured a 2.5 mm headset jack.

== Model list ==
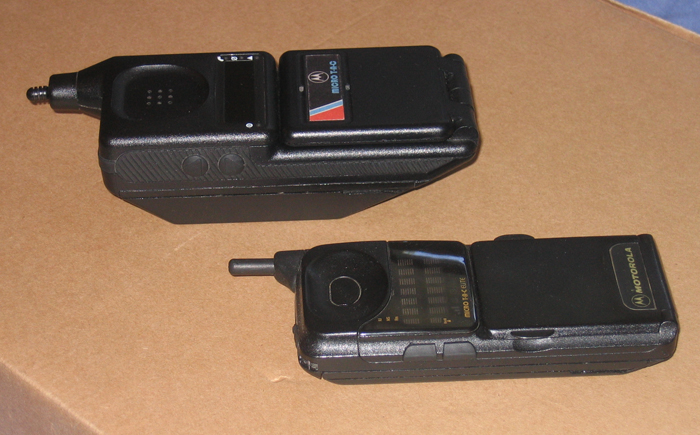
The original 9800X with a Talk-Pak battery was much larger and more than two times heavier than the later Elite VIP model.

1989

- MicroTAC 9800X (AMPS/ETACS/NMT/JTAC)
- Digital Personal Communicator (AMPS/ETACS)

1990

- MicroTAC 9800X S.I.P. (ETACS/RTMS-450)
- MicroTAC 950 (AMPS)

1991

- MicroTAC Classic (ETACS/NMT/GSM 900)
- MicroTAC Lite (AMPS)
- MicroTAC Lite VIP (AMPS)
- MicroTAC II (ETACS)

1992

- MicroTAC II Platinum (ETACS)
- MicroTAC Alpha (AMPS)
- MicroTAC DPC 550 (AMPS)
- MicroTAC Alpha VIP (AMPS)
- MicroTAC Ultra-Lite (AMPS)
- MicroTAC Ultra-Lite VIP (AMPS)

1993

- MicroTAC Lite XL (AMPS)
- MicroTAC Pro (ETACS)

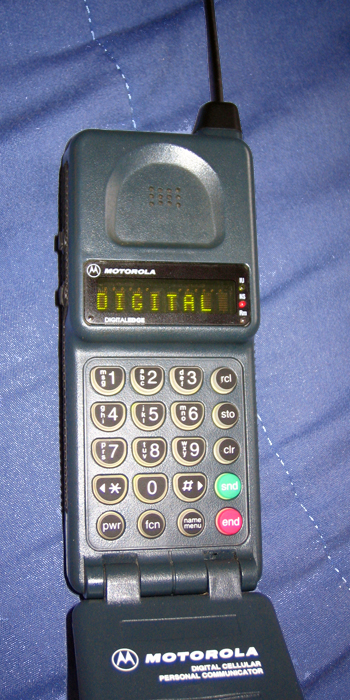
The MicroDigital from 1994 used the AMPS and TDMA networks.

1994

- Micro DIGITAL (TDMA/AMPS)
- Micro Digital Lite (TDMA/AMPS)
- MicroTAC Elite (NAMPS)
- MicroTAC Elite VIP (NAMPS)
- MicroTAC Digital Elite (TDMA/NAMPS)
- MicroTAC International 5080 (GSM 900)
- MicroTAC International 5200 (GSM 900)
- MicroTAC International 7200 (GSM 900)

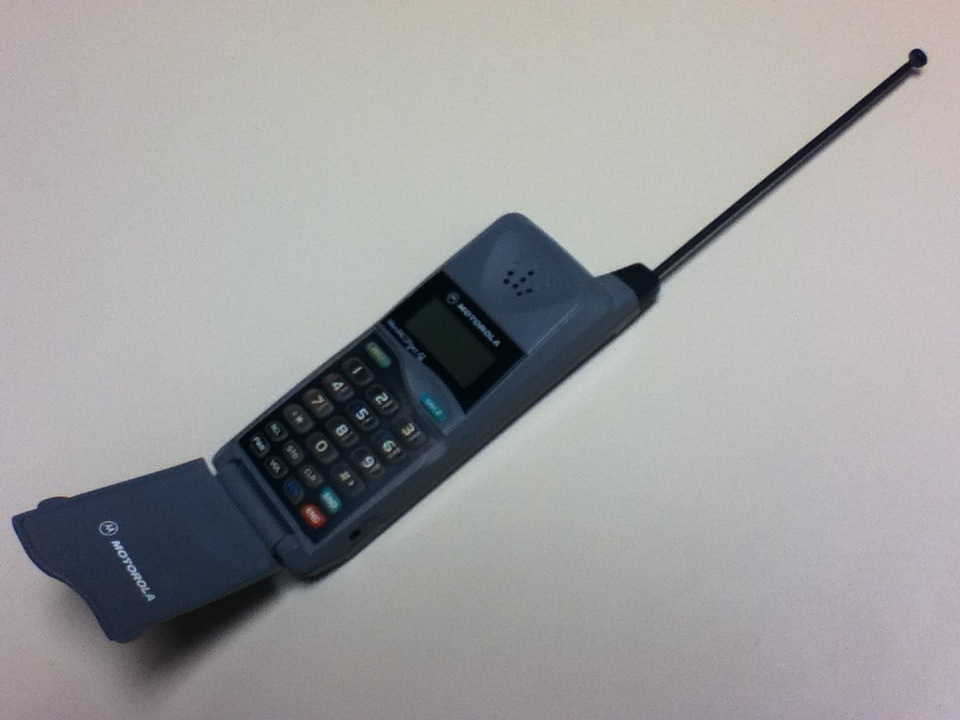
The MicroTAC Piper was introduced in 1995.

1995

- MicroTAC Piper (AMPS)
- DPC 650 (AMPS)
- MicroTAC 650 E (AMPS)
- MicroTAC International 7500 (GSM 900)
- MicroTAC International 8200 (GSM 900)

1996

- MicroTAC International 8400 (GSM 900)
- MicroTAC International 8700 (GSM 900)

1997

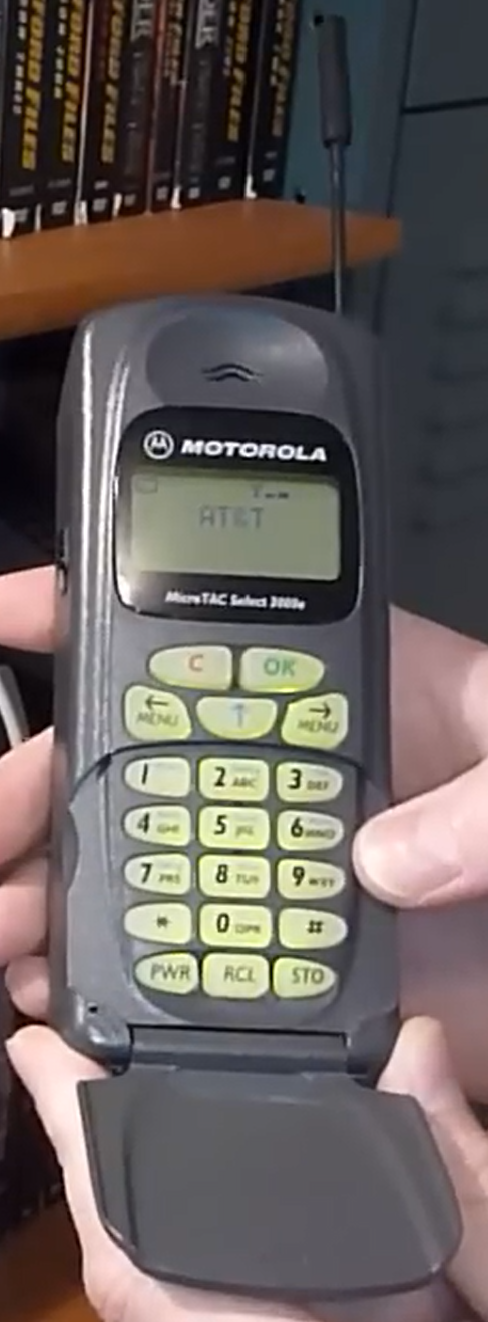
- MicroTAC 3000e released in 1997
  MicroTAC Select 3000e (GSM 1900)
- MicroTAC Select 6000e (GSM 1900)
- MicroTAC 925 (CDMA)
- MicroTAC International 8800 (GSM 900/1800)
- MicroTAC International 8900 (GSM 900/1800)

1998

- MicroTAC 8200 (AMPS)
- MicroTAC 725 (CDMA)
- MicroTAC DMT-8000 (CDMA) (South Korea)

== See also ==
- Motorola StarTAC
- Communicator (Star Trek)
- Grillo telephone
- Clamshell design
