= Motorola Timeport =

Series of mobile phones by Motorola

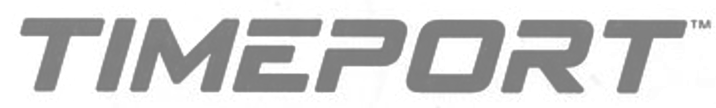
- Compatible networks: GSM, TDMA, CDMA, AMPS

The Motorola Timeport is a former series of executive candybar and flip mobile phones as well as pagers manufactured by Motorola. The series was introduced in 1999 and marketed until about 2003.

Product models include: (incomplete list)

- P1088 (canceled)
- L7089 (1999)
- P7389 (2000)
- P8767 (2000)
- P8088 (refresh of StarTAC 160/X)
- 250 (2001)
- 270c (2001)
- 280 (2001) (P280, known as T280 in Europe)
- 260 (2002)

== Timeport P1088 (canceled smartphone) ==
The Motorola Multiple Application Phone (MAP) was a device built by Motorola. Named Timeport P1088, the device was developed around 1997 and after but was never released to market. It was presented numerous times at CeBIT fairs. The P1088 was an early example of a smartphone.

== Timeport L7089 ==
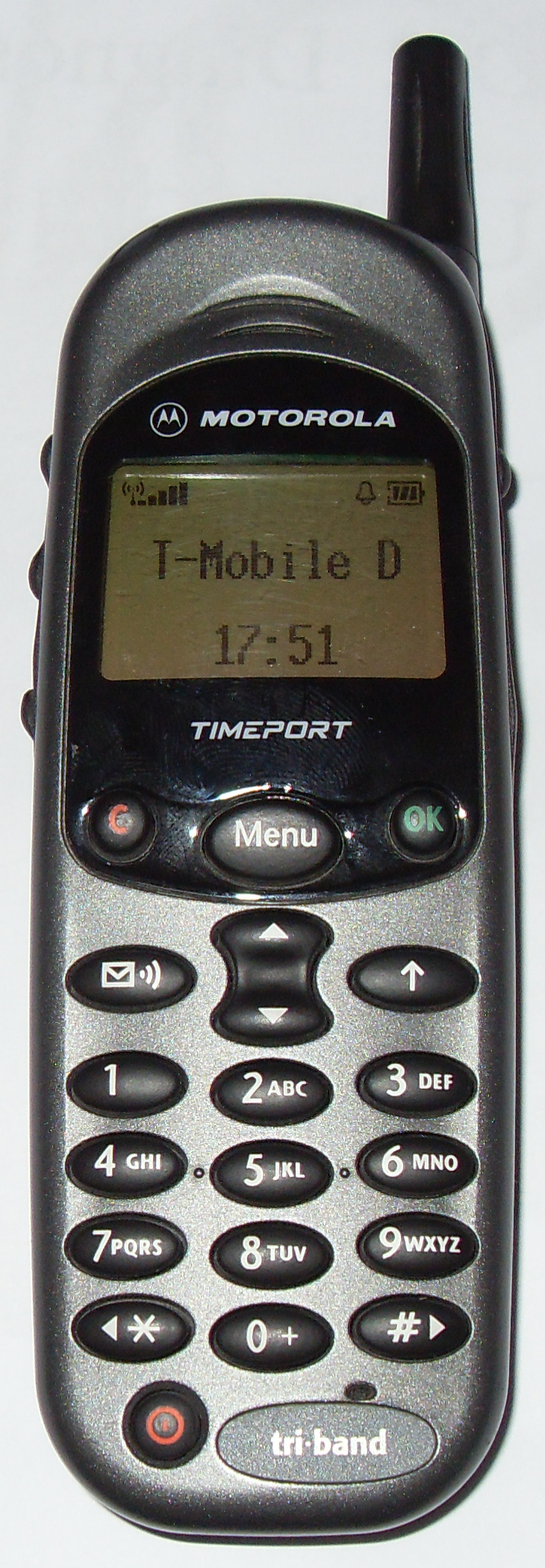
Timeport L7089

Motorola Timeport L7089 released in 1999 was claimed by Motorola to be the world's first tri-band (900/1800/1900 bands) GSM phone, meaning that it could be used over the world.

== Timeport P8767 – The first mobile phone with OLED display. ==
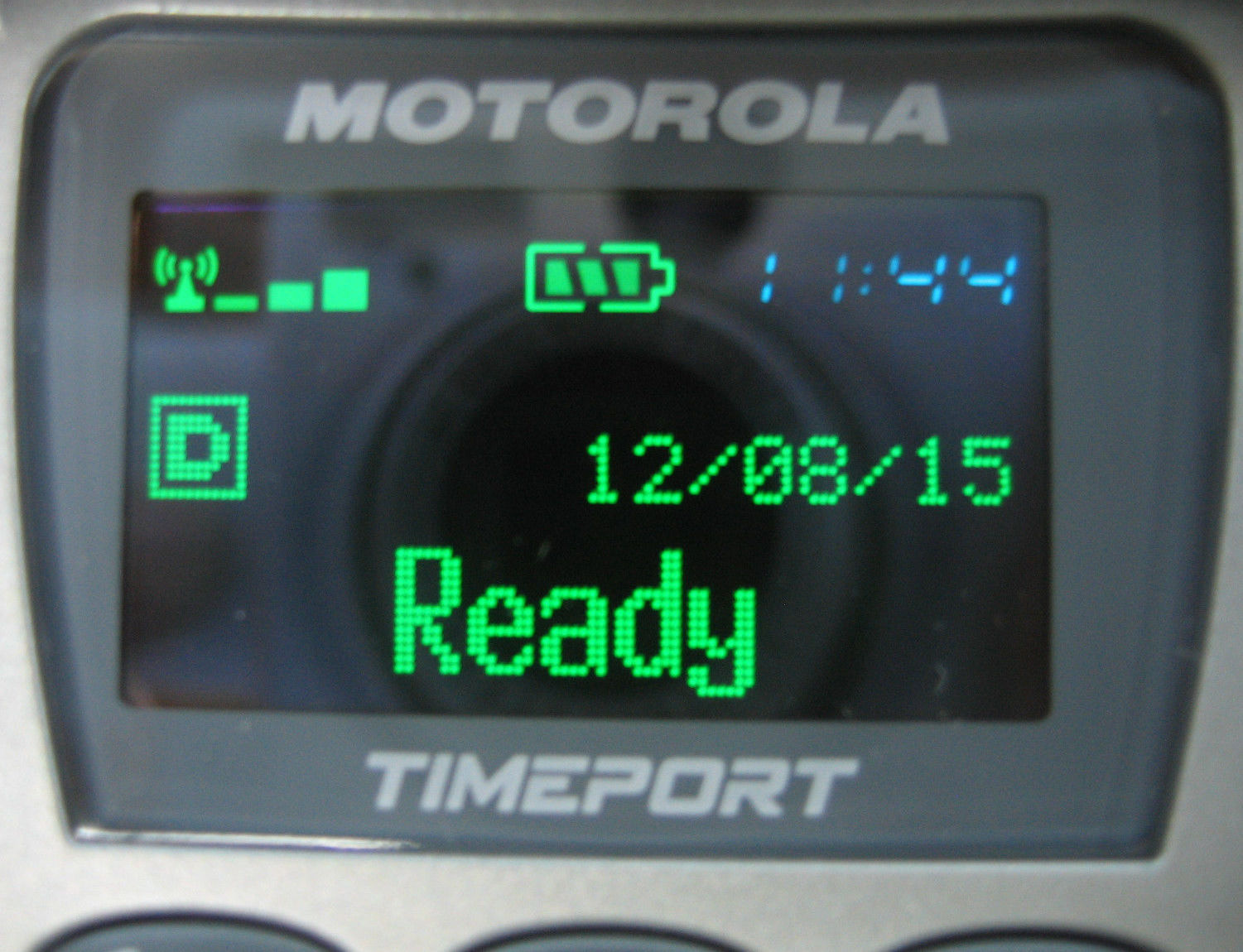
Display of the Motorola Timeport P8767

Motorola Timeport P8767, introduced in September 2000 and released in December 2000, includes the Organic Electroluminescent phone display, developed by Tohoku Pioneer Corporation, using Pioneer OEL technology (PM-OLED display in today's terminology). The display is not full color, but area color (green, blue and red in own areas).

== Timeport 280 ==
The Motorola Timeport 280 (P280, or T280 in Europe) was introduced in 2001 and was one of the first handsets in the US with GPRS technology. It is tri-band GSM and also has IrDA, Bluetooth, and WAP.

== Use in Mercedes-Benz vehicles ==
The flip phone version of the Timeport was included with select late 1990s and early 2000s Mercedes-Benz vehicles. The phone integrated with the vehicle's COMAND infotainment system, as well as its telematics system. In these vehicles, the phone's Motorola logo was replaced with the Mercedes-Benz "Star" logo on the outside of the flip, but retained the Motorola and "Timeport" branding on the inside of the flip, as well as the Motorola logo appearing on the phone's monochrome display screen when it was first powered on.
