= Larry Howell =

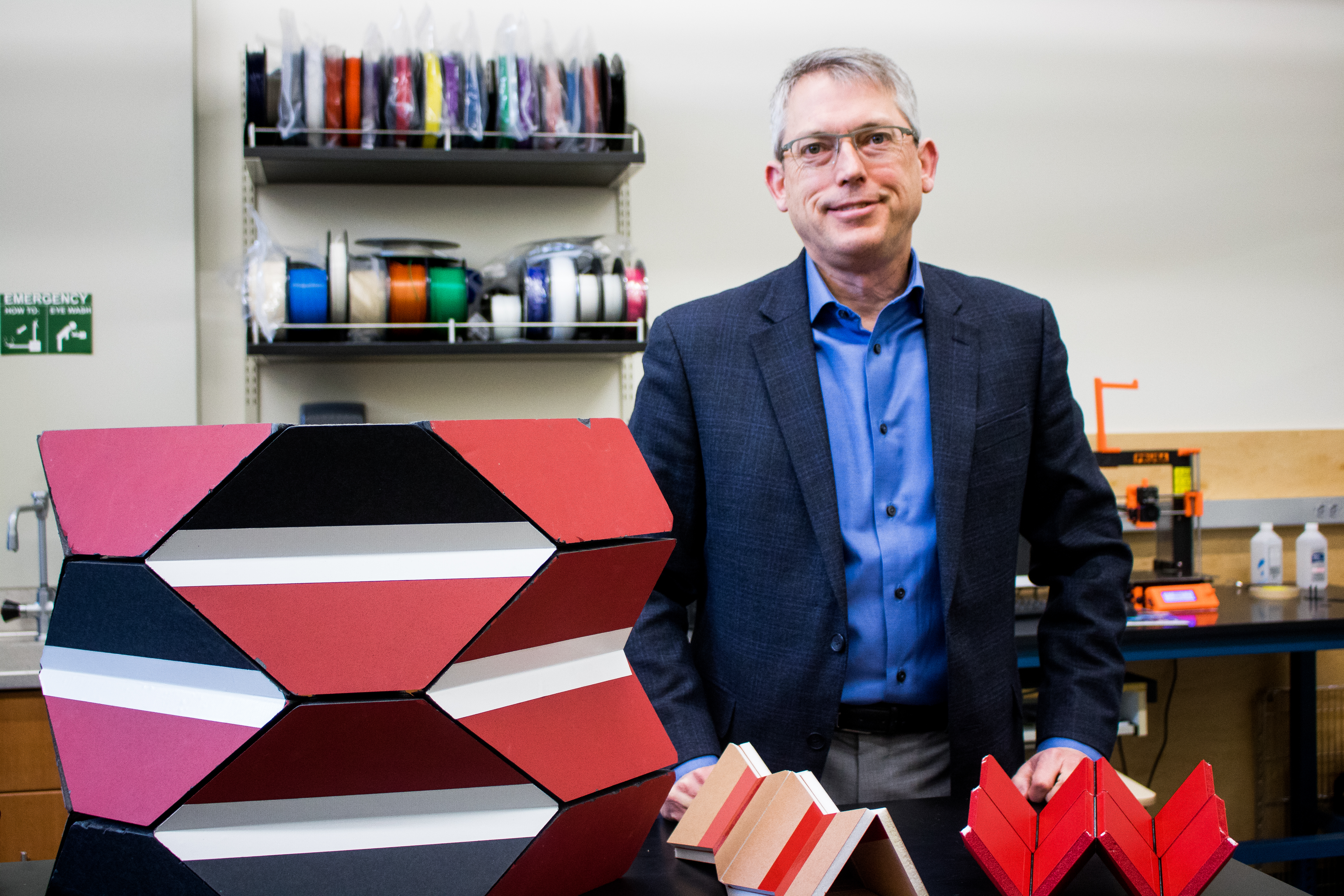
Larry L. Howell, Professor, Brigham Young University

Larry L. Howell is a professor and Associate Academic Vice President (AAVP) at Brigham Young University (BYU). His research focuses on compliant mechanisms, including origami-inspired mechanisms, microelectromechanical systems, medical devices, space mechanisms, and developable mechanisms. Howell has also conducted research in lamina emergent mechanisms and nanoinjection. He received a bachelor's degree in mechanical engineering from BYU and master's and Ph.D. degrees from Purdue University. His Ph.D. advisor was Ashok Midha, who is regarded as the "Father of Compliant Mechanisms."

== Biography ==
Howell is originally from Portage, a small city in northern Utah with a 2010 census population of 245 people. As a young man, he served as a missionary for the Church of Jesus Christ of Latter-day Saints in Finland.

Howell joined the BYU faculty in 1994 and served as chair of the Department of Mechanical Engineering from 2001 to 2007 and as Associate Dean of the Ira A. Fulton College of Engineering from 2016 to 2019. In addition to research, he has been a BYU AAVP since 2019. Prior to joining BYU, he was a visiting professor at Purdue University, a Finite-Element Analyst for Engineering Methods, Inc., and he was an engineer on the design of the YF-22, the first prototype of the U.S. Air Force F-22 Raptor. His patents, technical publications, and research focus on compliant mechanisms, including origami-inspired mechanisms, space mechanisms, microelectromechanical systems, and medical devices. His research has been funded by the National Science Foundation, Air Force Office of Scientific Research, NASA, Department of Defense, and industry. He is the author of the book 'Compliant Mechanisms and co-editor of the Handbook of Compliant Mechanisms, which are available in English and Chinese. His lab's work has also been featured in popular venues such as the New York Times, CNN, Newsweek, Scientific American, The Economist, Smithsonian Magazine, and the PBS documentary program NOVA. His outreach efforts include making files available for 3D printing compliant mechanisms, and working with STEM influencers such as Mark Rober and Derek Muller. He presented "Anatomy of Invention" as a BYU Forum and earlier gave a BYU Devotional both broadcast on BYU TV.

Howell is a Fellow of the American Society of Mechanical Engineers (ASME), the Past Chair of the ASME Mechanisms and Robotics Committee, and a past Associate Editor for the Journal of Mechanical Design. His research has been recognized by the National Science Foundation CAREER Award, the Theodore von Kármán Fellowship, and the ASME Mechanisms and Robotics Award, the 2015 "Vizzies" Overall People's Choice Award, the ASME Machine Design Award, and the Purdue University Outstanding Mechanical Engineer (alumni award) among others.

== Books ==
Howell, L.L., Compliant Mechanisms, John Wiley & Sons, New York, NY, 2001.

Morgan, D.C., Halverson, D., Magleby, S.P., Bateman, T., and Howell, L.L., Y Origami?: Explorations in Folding, American Mathematical Society (AMS), 2017.

Howell, Larry L., Spencer P. Magleby, and Brian M. Olsen, eds. Handbook of Compliant Mechanisms. John Wiley & Sons, 2013.

== Selected articles ==
Howell, L.L., Brigham Young University Google Scholar

Howell, L.L., and Bateman, T., “Extending research impact by sharing maker information,” Nature Communications, 14, article 6170, https://doi.org/10.1038/s41467-023-41886-3, 2023.

Rubio, A.J., Kaddour, A.S., Pruett, H., Magleby, S., Howell, L.L., Georgakopoulos, S.V., “A Deployable Volume-Efficient Miura-Ori Reflectarray Antenna for Small Satellite Applications,” IEEE Access, vol. 11, pp. 119313–119329, doi: 10.1109/ACCESS.2023.3327057, https://ieeexplore.ieee.org/document/10292669, 2023.

Sargent, B., Varela, K., Eggett, D., McKenna, E., Bates, C., Brown, R., Garcia, V., Howell, L., “Modeling of the chest wall response to prolonged bracing in pectus carinatum,” PLOS ONE, Vol. 18, No. 8, e0288941, DOI: 10.1371/journal.pone.0288941, 2023.

Nelson, T., Zimmerman, T., Magleby, S., Lang, R., and Howell, L., “Developable Mechanisms on Developable Surfaces,” Science Robotics, Vol. 4, Issue 27, DOI: 10.1126/scirobotics.aau5171, 2019.

Howell, L.L., “Complex Motion Guided without External Control,” Nature, News & Views, Vol. 561, pp. 470–471, 2018.

Lang, R.J., Tolman, K., Crampton, E. Magleby, S.P., Howell, L.L., “A Review of Thickness-Accommodation Techniques in Origami-Inspired Engineering,” Applied Mechanics Reviews, Vol. 70, 010805–1 to 010805–20, DOI: 10.1115/1.4039314, (second-most downloaded AMR papers in 2019), 2018.

Yellowhorse, A., Lang. R.J., Tolman, K.A., Howell, L.L., “Creating Linkage Permutations to Prevent Self-Intersection and Enable Deployable Networks of Thick-Origami,” Scientific Reports, Vol. 8, paper 12936, DOI: 10.1038/s41598-018-31180-4, 2018.

Nelson, T.G., Lang, R.L., Pehrson, N., Magleby, S.P., Howell, L.L., “Facilitating Deployable Mechanisms and Structures via Developable Lamina Emergent Arrays,” ASME Journal of Mechanisms and Robotics, Vol. 8, pp. 031006–1 to 031006–10, DOI: 10.1115/1.4031901, 2016.

Homer, E.R., Harris, M.B., Zirbel, S.A., Kolodziejska, J.A., Kozachkov, H. Trease, B.P., Borgonia, J.C., Agnes, G.S., Howell, L.L., and Hofmann, D.C., “New Methods for Developing and Manufacturing Compliant Mechanisms Utilizing Bulk Metallic Glass,” Advanced Engineering Materials, Vol. 16, No. 7, PP. 850–856, DOI: 10.1002/adem.201300566, 2014.

Zirbel, S.A., Lang, R.J., Magleby, S.P., Thomson, M.W., Sigel, D.A., Walkemeyer, P.E., Trease, B.P., Howell, L.L., “Accommodating Thickness in Origami-Based Deployable Arrays,^{[1]}” Journal of Mechanical Design, Vol. 135, paper no. 111005, DOI: 10.1115/1.4025372, 2013.

Aten, Q.T., Jensen, B.D., Tamowski, S., Wilson, A.M., Howell, L.L., Burnett, S.H., “Nanoinjection: Pronuclear DNA Delivery using a Charged Lance,” Transgenic Research, DOI: 10.1007/s11248-012-9610-6, Vol. 21, No. 6, pp. 1279–1290, 2012.

Howell, L.L. and Midha, A., “A Method for the Design of Compliant Mechanisms with Small-Length Flexural Pivots,” Journal of Mechanical Design, Trans. ASME, Vol. 116, pp. 280–290, March 1994.

== Selected patents ==
“Deployable Origami-Inspired Barriers”, Howell, L.L., Magleby, S.P., Morgan, D.C., Bateman, T., Niven, J.E., Avila, A., Crampton, E., Tolman, K., Greenwood, J., Schleede, P., US Patent 11,650,028, issued May 16, 2023.

“Maintaining Positions of Panels with Biasing Members and Cables,” Magleby, S.P., Howell, L.L., and Pehrson, N., US Patent 11,533,018, issued December 20, 2022.

“Compliant Mechanisms Having Inverted Tool Members,” Dearden, J., Tanner, J., Grames, C., Edmondson, B., Jensen, B.D., Magleby, S.P., Howell, L.L., U.S. Patent 11,123,145, issued September 21, 2021

“Surgical Forceps,” Bryce Edmondson, Clayton Grames, Landen Bowen, Eric Call, Terri Bateman, Spencer Magleby, Larry Howell, U.S. Patent 9,867,631, issued January 16, 2018.

“Spinal Implant,” Halverson, P., Howell, L.L., Magleby, S.P., and Bowden, A., U.S. Patent 9,314,346, issued April 19, 2016.

“Carbon Nanotube-based Compliant Mechanism,” Culpepper, M.L., Magleby, S.P., Howell, L.L., DiBiasio, C., Panas, R., U.S. Patent 7,884,525, February 8, 2011.
