= Jonathan B. Hopkins =

American professor

Dr. Jonathan Brigham Hopkins
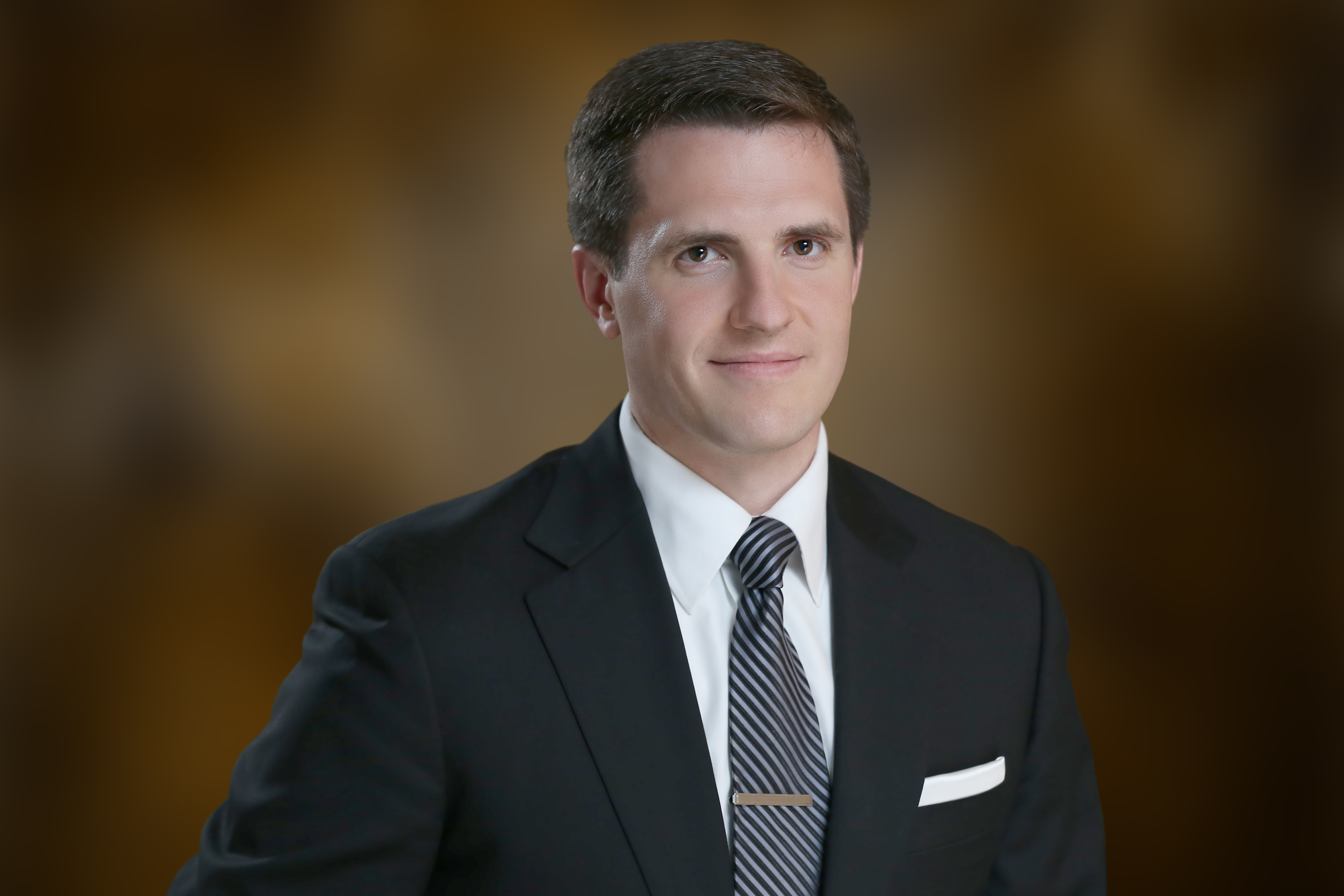
- Education: Mechanical Engineering at Massachusetts Institute of Technology Ph.D. 2010, M.S. 2007, B.S. 2005
- Occupation: Professor
- Employer(s): University of California, Los Angeles
- Known for: Compliant mechanism and metamaterials research and design
- Notable work: Creator of F.A.C.T. mechanical design framework
- Title: ASME Fellow and Director of the Flexible Research Group at UCLA
- Awards: Presidential Early Career Award for Scientists and Engineers (2013)
- Website: https://flexible.seas.ucla.edu/

Jonathan Brigham Hopkins is a professor of mechanical engineering at UCLA where he serves as Director of the Flexible Research Group and Vice-Chair for Graduate Affairs. Hopkins created the Freedom and Constraint Topologies (F.A.C.T.) system of mechanical design, especially for the design of compliant mechanisms.

== Honors ==
In February 2016 Hopkins was awarded the Presidential Early Career Award for Scientists and Engineers by President Barack Obama as part of the award class of 2013.

In 2021 Hopkins was elected a fellow of the American Society of Mechanical Engineers (ASME).

Hopkins' publication "Compliant Mechanisms That Use Static Balancing to Achieve Dramatically Different States of Stiffness" was selected for the 2021 Best Paper Award by the ASME Journal of Mechanisms and Robotics.

== FACT ==
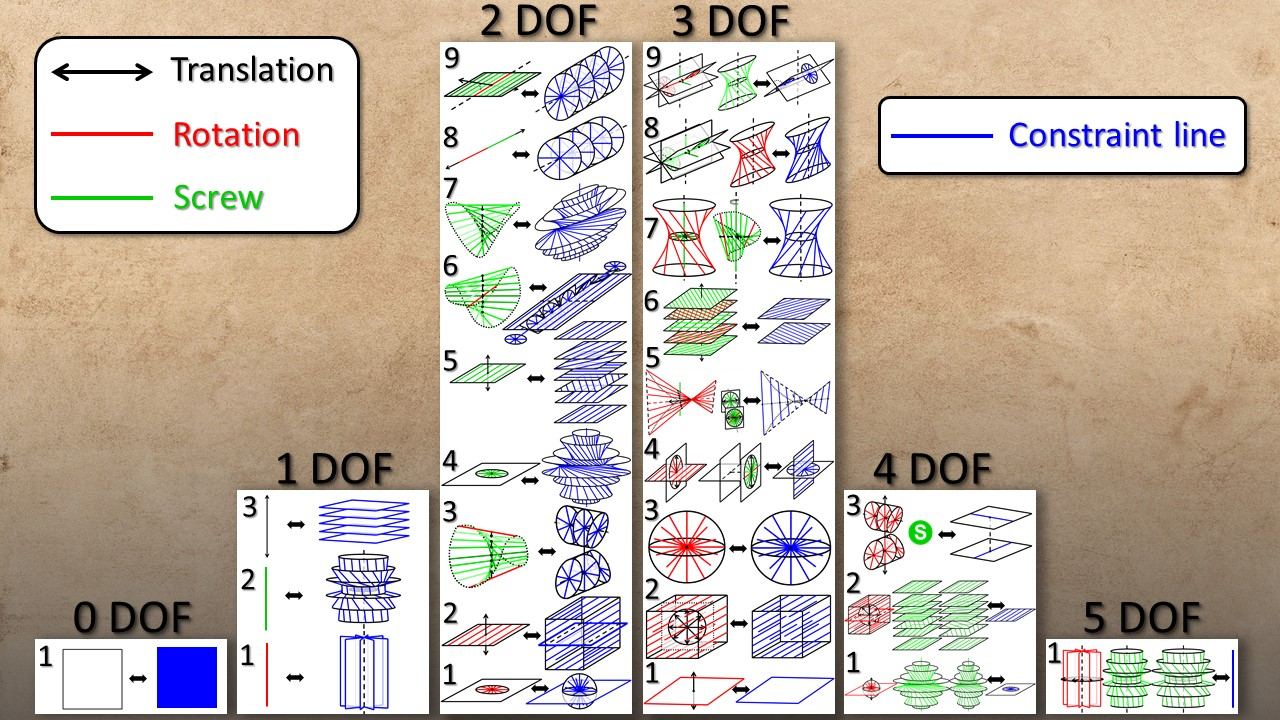
The practical FACT chart showing the subset of 26 topologies realizable with a parallel flexure design

Hopkins introduced his Freedom and Constraint Topology (FACT) design paradigm in his 2007 Masters thesis. The paradigm was further refined in his 2010 PhD thesis. The paradigm synthesizes concepts from screw theory and projective geometry along with Maxwell's criterion for structural rigidity. FACT establishes a finite set of exactly 50 topologies which describe every possible configuration of flexure systems except for hybrid interconnected systems.

FACT is featured in chapter 6 of the Handbook of Compliant Mechanisms edited by Hopkins' mentor Larry Howell.

== YouTube Channel ==
Dr. Hopkins recorded his graduate level compliant mechanisms design course to offer virtual instruction to his students during the COVID-19 pandemic. Hopkins self-published the course as a free lecture series on YouTube. His channel is called "The FACTs of Mechanical Design", named after his FACT design paradigm. As of 2024, the channel contains a wide range of content on the principles and applications of compliant mechanisms, along with an additional free lecture series on traditional rigid body mechanisms.

== Selected Patents ==
"Array directed light-field display for autostereoscopic viewing"

"Compliant mechanisms for orthopaedic joint replacement and implanted prostheses"

"Compliant self-anchoring screw with auxetic properties"

== Selected publications ==
Hopkins has well over 50 academic publications. Only a subset is included here. "Design, material, function, and fabrication of metamaterials"

"Compliant Mechanisms That Use Static Balancing to Achieve Dramatically Different States of Stiffness"

"Phase-Changing Metamaterial Capable of Variable Stiffness and Shape Morphing"
