= Self-adaptive mechanisms =

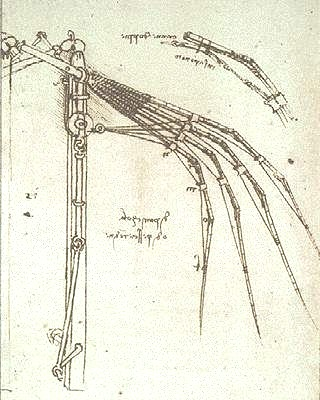
Flapping wing mechanism proposed by Leonardo da Vinci in the Codex Atlanticus.

Self-adaptive mechanisms, sometimes simply called adaptive mechanisms, in engineering, are underactuated mechanisms that can adapt to their environment. One of the most well-known example of this type of mechanisms are underactuated fingers, grippers, and robotic hands. Contrary to standard underactuated mechanisms where the motion is governed by the dynamics of the system, the motion of self-adaptive mechanisms is generally constrained by compliant elements cleverly located in the mechanisms.

== Definition ==
Underactuated mechanisms have a lower number of actuators than the number of degrees of freedom (DOF). In a two-dimensional plane, a mechanism can have up to three DOF (two translations, one rotation), and in three-dimensional Euclidean space, up to six (three translations, three rotations). In the case of self-adaptive mechanisms, the lack of actuators is compensated by passive elements that constrain the motion of the system. Springs are a good example of such elements, but other can be used depending on the type of mechanisms.

One of the earliest example of self-adaptive mechanism is the flapping wing proposed by Leonardo da Vinci in the Codex Atlanticus.

== Underactuated hands ==
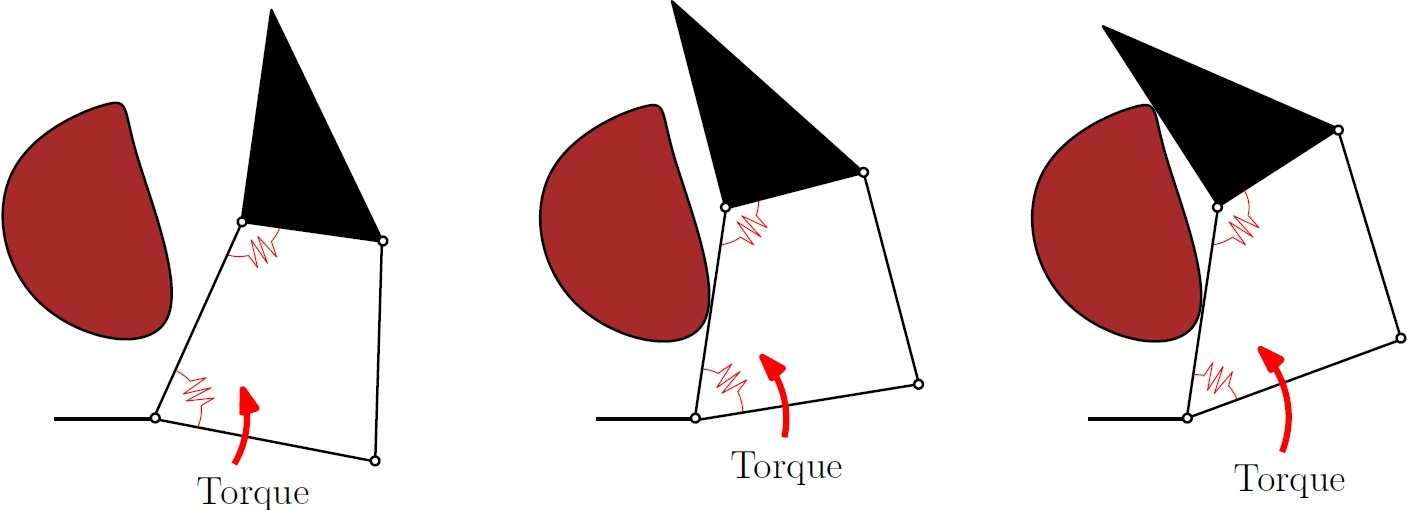
Self-adaptive motion of a linkage-driven finger.

The first commonly known underactuated finger was the Soft-Gripper designed by Shigeo Hirose in the late 1970s. The most common type of transmission mechanisms used in self-adaptive hands are linkages and tendons.

=== Kinetostatics ===
Underactuated fingers and hands are usually analyzed with respect to their kinetostatics (negligible kinetic energy, static analysis of a mechanism in motion) rather than the dynamics of the system, as the kinetic energy of these systems is generally negligible compared to the potential energy stored into the passive elements. The forces applied by each phalanx of an underactuated finger can be computed with the following expression:

$\mathbf{F}=\mathbf{J}^{-T}\mathbf{T}^{*T}\mathbf{t}$

where F is the vector made of the forces applied, J is the Jacobian matrix of the finger, T^{*} is the transmission matrix, and t is the torque vector made (actuator and passive elements).

=== Applications ===
A self-adaptive robotic hand, SARAH (Self-Adaptive Robot Auxiliary Hand), was designed and built to be part of the Dextre’s toolbox. Dextre is a robotic telemanipulator that resides at the end of CANADARM-2 on the International Space Station. The Yale OpenHand is an example of open source self-adaptive mechanisms that can be found online. Some companies are also selling self-adaptive hands for industrial purposes. Prosthetics is another application for self-adaptive hands. One known example is the SPRING (Self-Adaptive Prosthesis for Restoring Natural Grasping) hand.

== Other examples ==
Self-adaptive mechanisms can be used for other applications, such as walking robots.

Compliant mechanisms are another example of self-adaptive mechanisms, where the passive elements and the transmission mechanism are a single monolithic block.
