= Mechanisms and Robotics Award =

The Mechanisms and Robotics Award is an honor that is given annually by the Mechanisms and Robotics Committee of the American Society of Mechanical Engineers (ASME), to engineers known for a lifelong contribution to the field of mechanism design or theory. This prestigious honor can only be given once to any individual.

The award was established in 1974 and was awarded in even years at the ASME Biennial Mechanisms & Robotics Conference, until 2005 when the conference was made an annual event. The award is under the direction of the Design Engineering Division of ASME.

== Past Award Recipients ==
Source: ASME

- 2021: Qiaode (Jeffery) Ge
- 2016: Sunil K. Agrawal
- 2015: Jian S. Dai
- 2014: Gregory S. Chirikjian
- 2013: Steven Dubowsky
- 2012: Vijay Kumar (roboticist)
- 2011: J. Michael McCarthy
- 2009: Larry L. Howell
- 2008: C. Gosselin
- 2007: C. W. Wampler, II
- 2006: K. Kazerounian
- 2005: J. K. Davidson
- 2004: John J. Uicker
- 2002: K.C. Gupta
- 2000: J. Angeles
- 1998: A. Midha
- 1996: A. T. Yang
- 1994: A. Soni
- 1992: J. Duffy
- 1990: K. J. Waldron
- 1988: A. G. Erdman
- 1986: K. H. Hunt
- 1984: G. G. Lowen
- 1982: B. Roth
- 1980: G. N. Sandor
- 1978: F. Freudenstein
- 1976: F. R. E. Crossley
- 1974: A. S. Hall, Jr., R. S. Hartenberg, and J. E. Shigley

== See also ==
- List of mechanical engineering awards
