= Sunil K. Agrawal =

Indian roboticist

- Born: 1963 (age 62–63)
- Citizenship: India; United States
- Education: Stanford University; Ohio State University; Indian Institute of Technology Kanpur
- Scientific career
- Fields: Robotics
- Institutions: Columbia University; University of Delaware; Ohio University
- Doctoral advisor: Bernard Roth

Sunil K. Agrawal (born 1963) is an Indian roboticist and professor of Fu Foundation School of Engineering and Applied Science with secondary appointment in Rehabilitation and Regenerative Medicine at Columbia University. Agrawal is the author of more than 500 journals, three books, and has 15 U.S. patents.

== Background and career ==
Prof. Agrawal obtained a PhD degree in Mechanical Engineering from Stanford University in 1990 with emphasis on robotics, dynamics, and control. He currently directs the Robotics and Rehabilitation Laboratory (ROAR) and Robotic Systems Engineering Laboratory (ROSE), which have an active group of PhD, MS, UG, and post-doctoral researchers at Columbia University. He joined Columbia University as a professor in 2013. Before joining Columbia, he was a faculty member at Ohio University and University of Delaware. Agrawal's current and past research has focused on the design of intelligent machines using non-linear system theoretic principles, computational algorithms for planning and optimization, design of novel rehabilitation machines, and training algorithms for functional rehabilitation of neural impaired adults and children.

== Academic Research ==
Agrawal's NSF funded robotics research over the years include “Free-floating Space Robots”, “Cable-actuated robotic platforms”, “Flapping-wing micro air vehicles”, “Cable-driven leg exoskeletons”, “Robot enhanced mobility of children”. His NIH supported research includes “Gait training of stroke survivors using robotic exoskeletons (R01)”, “Early mobility training of special needs infants and toddlers (R21)”, “Wearable exoskeleton for training of arm movements for survivors of stroke (Pilot)”.

Agrawal has pioneered novel approaches for design, trajectory planning, and optimization of under-actuated dynamic systems using the techniques of static feedback linearization, dynamic feedback linearization, and differential flatness. The fundamentals of this approach are summarized in journal papers, doctoral dissertations, and a research monograph “Differentially Flat Systems”. Agrawal's work on robotic exoskeletons and robot-assisted mobility for children is pioneering and is well cited by the research community.

== Professional Service ==
Agrawal has supervised dissertation/theses of 25 PhD and 35 MS students who have completed their degrees. His research has resulted in close to 500 refereed journal and conference papers, 8 US patents, and 10 pending patent applications/disclosures. Currently, Agrawal serves on the executive committee of ASME Design Division and is slated to be its chair in 2014. Agrawal has served as the Chair of ASME Mechanisms Technical Committee in 2006 and Chair of ASME Mechanisms and Robotics Conference in 2005. He has served on editorial boards and program committees of several prominent ASME and IEEE sponsored journals and conferences focused on robotics, control, and rehabilitation engineering.

== Awards ==
- NSF Presidential Faculty Fellowship - White House (1994)
- Bessel Prize - Alexander von Humboldt Foundation (2002)
- Fellow - ASME (2004)
- Humboldt U.S. Senior Scientist Award (2007)
- Distinguished Visiting Professor at Hanyang University in Korea - invited by Korea World Class University (WCU) Program (2009)
- Best Paper Award - 35th ASME Mechanisms and Robotics Conference (2011)
- Best Student Paper Award - IEEE International Conference in Robotics and Automation (2012)
- The Machine Design Award - ASME (2016)
- Mechanisms and Robotics Award - ASME (2016)

== Fellowship ==
It was announced on January 20, 2016, that Agrawal was to be inducted into the College of Fellows of the American Institute for Medical and Biological Engineering.
