= Remote center compliance =

Device to facilitate robotic insertion into holes with tight clearance

Remote center compliance in operation

Schematic of an RCC equipped robot: 1. Robot wrist, 2. Attachment ring, 3. RCC, 4. Gripper mechanism, 5. Gripper fingers

In robotics, a remote center compliance, remote center of compliance or RCC is a mechanical device that facilitates automated assembly by preventing peg-like objects from jamming when they are inserted into a hole with tight clearance. In a naive design without an RCC, a robot might pick up a peg with its gripper, center the peg over the hole, and then push the peg along the axis of the hole. If the peg is perfectly aligned and centered, it would then slide into the hole. However, if the peg's alignment or centering is slightly off, the peg contacts one side of the hole first and the peg's tip experiences a lateral force. As the robot's gripper is not perfectly stiff, the peg will tend to rotate about an axis in the plane of the gripper's fingers, called the center of compliance. Such a rotation further misaligns the peg, increasing the lateral force and causing more rotation, resulting in a jam that prevents the insertion from being completed.

The RCC changes the way the peg responds to a lateral force at its tip. The RCC is typically placed between the robot's wrist and the gripper, though it can be built into the gripper itself. The RCC lets the gripper assembly move in the plane perpendicular to the peg's axis, allowing the peg to rotate about an axis in the plane of the top of the hole, effectively moving the center of compliance from the gripper to the hole. With the RCC, the forces generated by any misalignment move the peg in a way that corrects the problem, rather than exacerbate it.
