= Lamina emergent mechanism =

A lamina emergent mechanism (LEM) or pop-up mechanism (as in pop-up books) is a compliant mechanism fabricated from planar materials (lamina) which has motion emerging from the fabrication plane. An LEM uses compliance, or the deflection of its flexible constituent parts, to achieve some or all of its motion.

== Background ==
Ortho-planar mechanisms are an earlier concept similar to LEMs. More well known LEMs include pop-up books, flat-folding origami mechanisms, origami stents, and deployable mechanisms. The research in LEMs also overlaps with deployable structures, origami, kirigami, compliant mechanisms, microelectromechanical systems, packaging engineering, robotics, paper engineering, developable mechanisms, and more.
