= Compliant mechanism =

Mechanism which transmits force through elastic body deformation

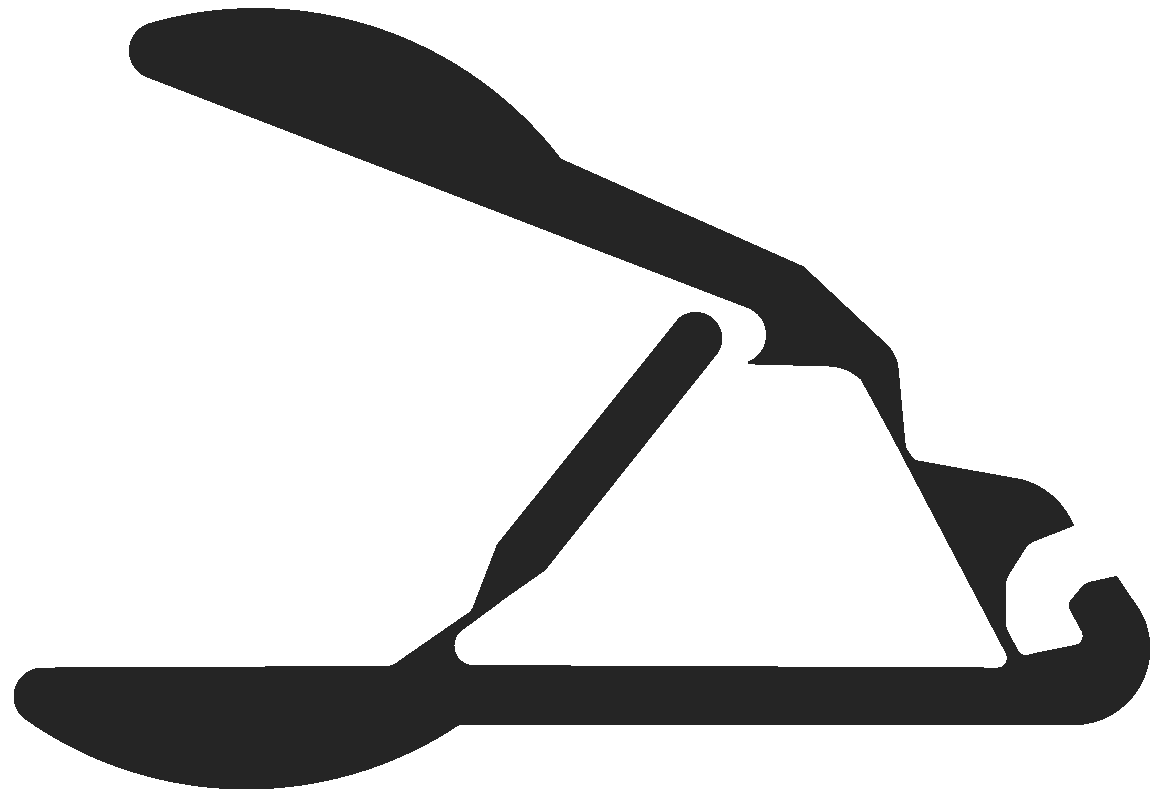
Compliant plier mechanism

In mechanical engineering, a compliant mechanism is a flexible mechanism that achieves force and motion transmission through elastic body deformation. It gains some or all of its motion from the relative flexibility of its members rather than from rigid-body joints alone. These may be monolithic (single-piece) or jointless structures. Some common devices that use compliant mechanisms are backpack latches and paper clips. One of the oldest examples of using compliant structures is the bow and arrow. Compliant mechanisms manufactured in a plane that have motion emerging from said plane are known as lamina emergent mechanisms or LEMs.

== Design methods ==
Compliant mechanism design continues to be an active area of research in the mid 2020s. Many methods have been developed for compliant mechanism design, broadly in two categories:

=== Kinematics approaches ===
Kinematic synthesis regards compliant mechanisms as discrete combinations of rigid and compliant elements.

==== Pseudo-rigid body model ====
The earliest kinematic approach relies on a pseudo-rigid-body model of the mechanism. In this model, flexible segments are modeled as rigid links connected to revolute joints with torsional springs. Other structures can be modeled as a combination of rigid links, springs, and dampers.

==== Constraint-based design ====
In freedom and constraint topologies (FACT) and screw-theory-based synthesis, basic compliant elements are first defined and analyzed by their degrees of constraint before being used to construct complex compliant mechanisms.

=== Structural optimization approach ===
These approaches treat the entire structure of the mechanism as one compliant body. Computational methods are used for topology optimization of the structure. Expected loading and desired motion and force transmission are input and the system is optimized for weight, accuracy, and minimum stresses. More advanced methods first optimize the underlying linkage configuration and then optimize the topology around that configuration. Other optimization techniques focus topology optimization of the flexure joints by taking as input a rigid mechanism and replacing all the rigid joints with optimized flexure joints. To predict the behavior of the structure, finite-element stress analysis is done to find deformation and stresses over the entire structure.

== Advantages ==
Compliant structures are often created as an alternative to similar mechanisms that use multiple parts. There are two main advantages for using compliant mechanisms: low cost and better efficiency.

=== Low cost ===
A compliant mechanism can usually be fabricated into a single structure, which is a dramatic simplification in the number of required parts. A single-piece compliant structure can be manufactured through injection molding, extrusion, and 3d printing, among other methods. This makes the manufacturing relatively cheap and accessible.

=== Better efficiency ===
Compliant mechanisms do not suffer from some issues that affect multi-bodied mechanisms, such as backlash or surface wear. Due to the usage of flexible elements, compliant mechanisms can easily store energy to be released at a later time or transformed into other forms of energy.

== Disadvantages ==
The full range of a mechanism depends on the material and geometry of the structure; due to the nature of flexure joints, no purely compliant mechanism can achieve continuous motion such as found in a normal joint. Also, the forces applied by the mechanism are limited to the loads the structural elements can withstand without failure. Due to the shape of flexure joints, they tend to be locations of stress concentration. This, combined with the fact that mechanisms tend to perform cyclic or periodic motion, can cause fatigue and eventual failure of the structure. Also, since some or all of the input energy is stored in the structure for some time, not all of this energy is released back as desired. However, this can be a desirable property to add damping to the system.

== Applications ==
Some of the oldest uses of compliant structures date back to several millennia. One of the oldest examples is the bow and arrow. Some designs of catapults also made use of the flexibility of the arm to store and release energy to launch the projectile larger distances. Compliant mechanisms are used in a variety of fields such as adaptive structures and biomedical devices. Compliant mechanisms can be used to create self-adaptive mechanisms, commonly used for grasping in robotics. Since robots require high accuracy and have limited range, there has been extensive research in compliant robot mechanisms. Microelectromechanical systems are one of the main applications of compliant mechanisms. These systems benefit from the lack of required assembly and simple planar shape of the structure which can be easily manufactured using photolithography.

The flexible drive or resilient drive, often used to couple an electric motor to a machine (for example, a pump), is one example. The drive consists of a rubber "spider" sandwiched between two metal dogs. One dog is fixed to the motor shaft and the other to the pump shaft. The flexibility of the rubber part compensates for any slight misalignment between the motor and the pump. See rag joint and giubo.

== Image gallery ==
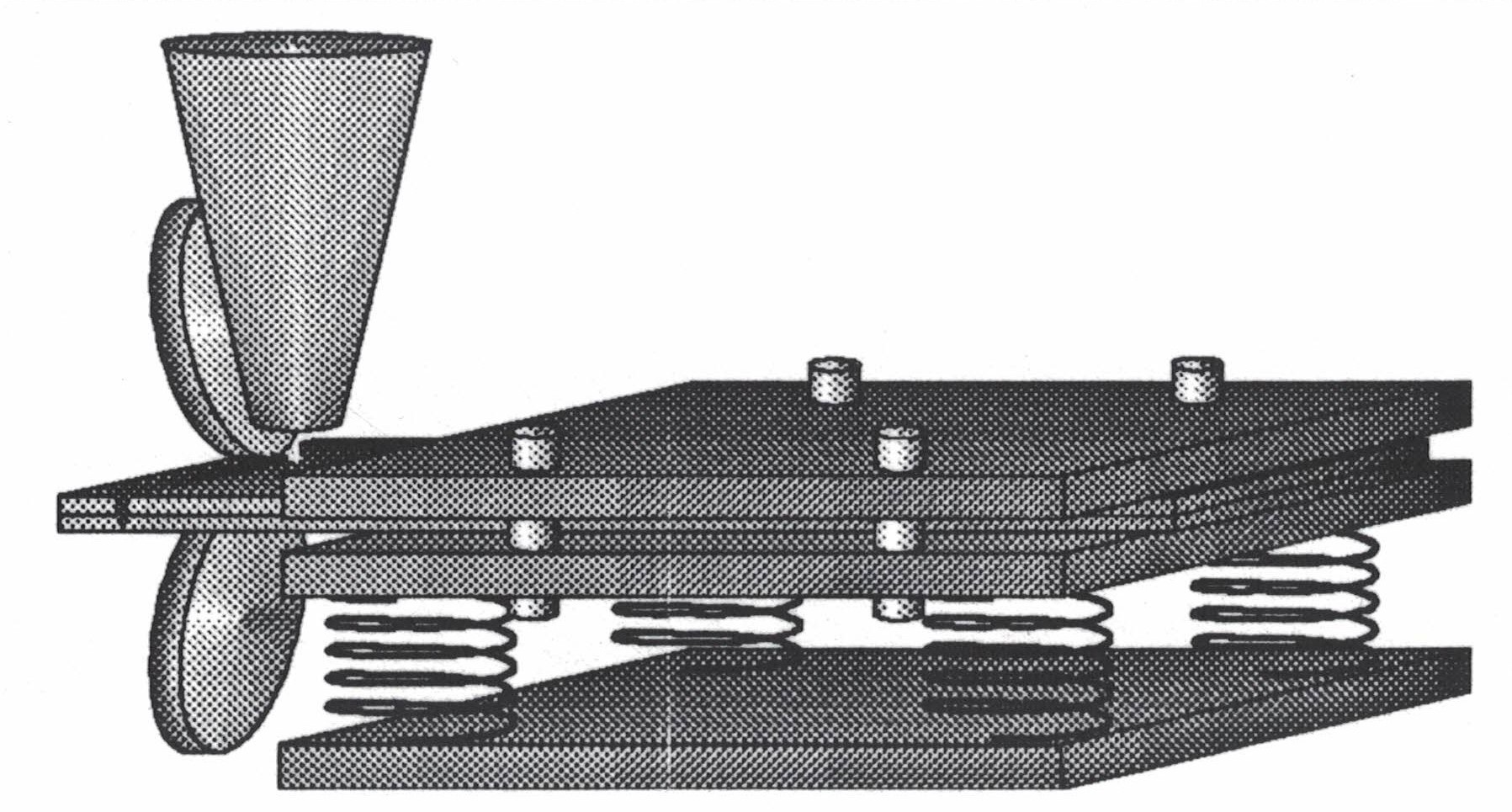
A laser welding robot positions the workpieces by a compliant mechanism between table and fixture

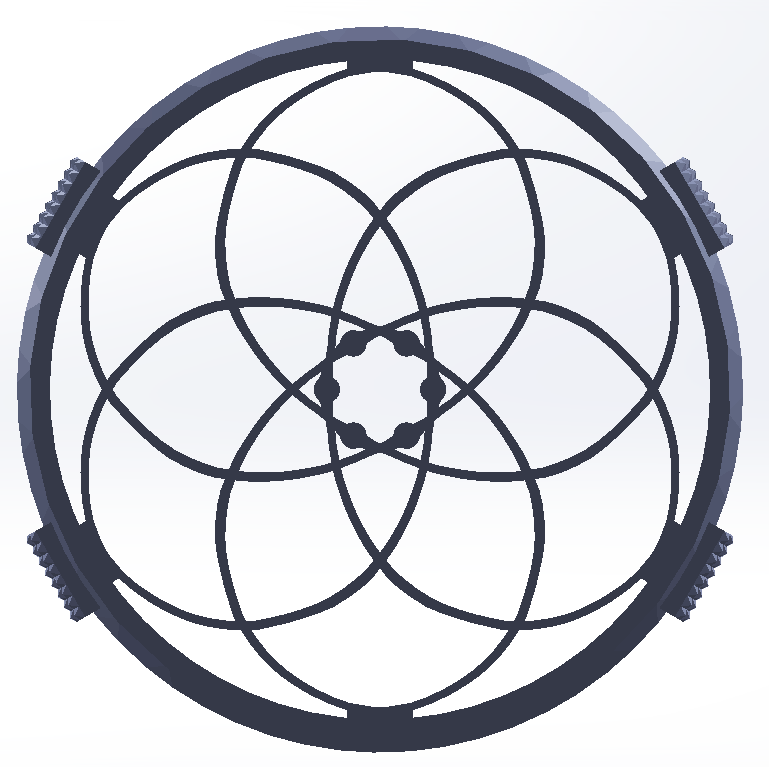
Compliant iris mechanism – closed

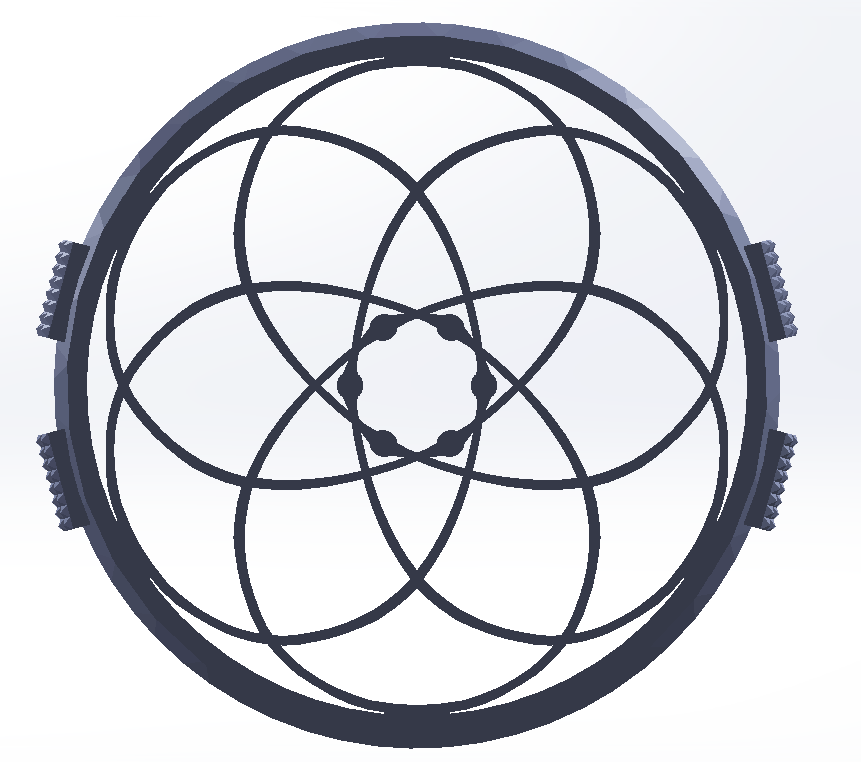
Compliant iris mechanism – open

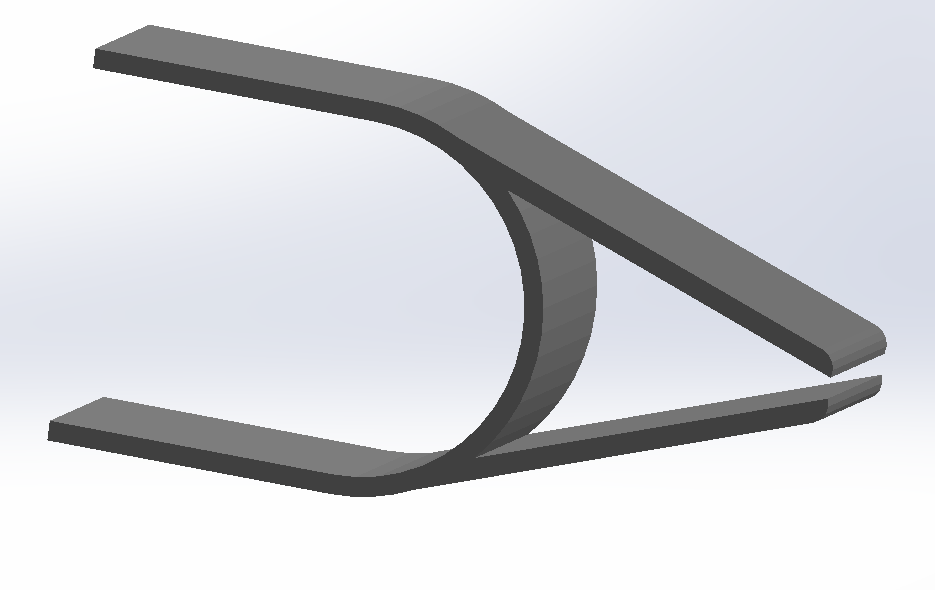
Compliant clip

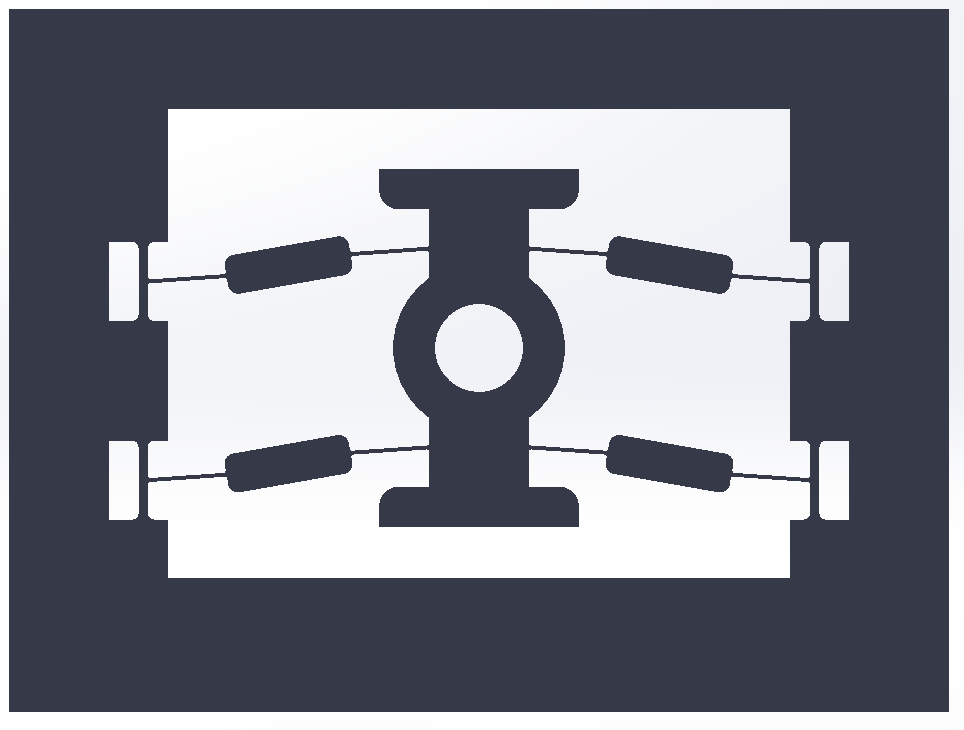
Bistable compliant switch mechanism

== See also ==
- Stiffness
- Remote center compliance
- Living hinge
- Flexure bearing
- Self-adaptive mechanisms
