= Developable mechanism =

Developable mechanisms are a special class of mechanisms that can be placed on developable surfaces.

== Examples ==
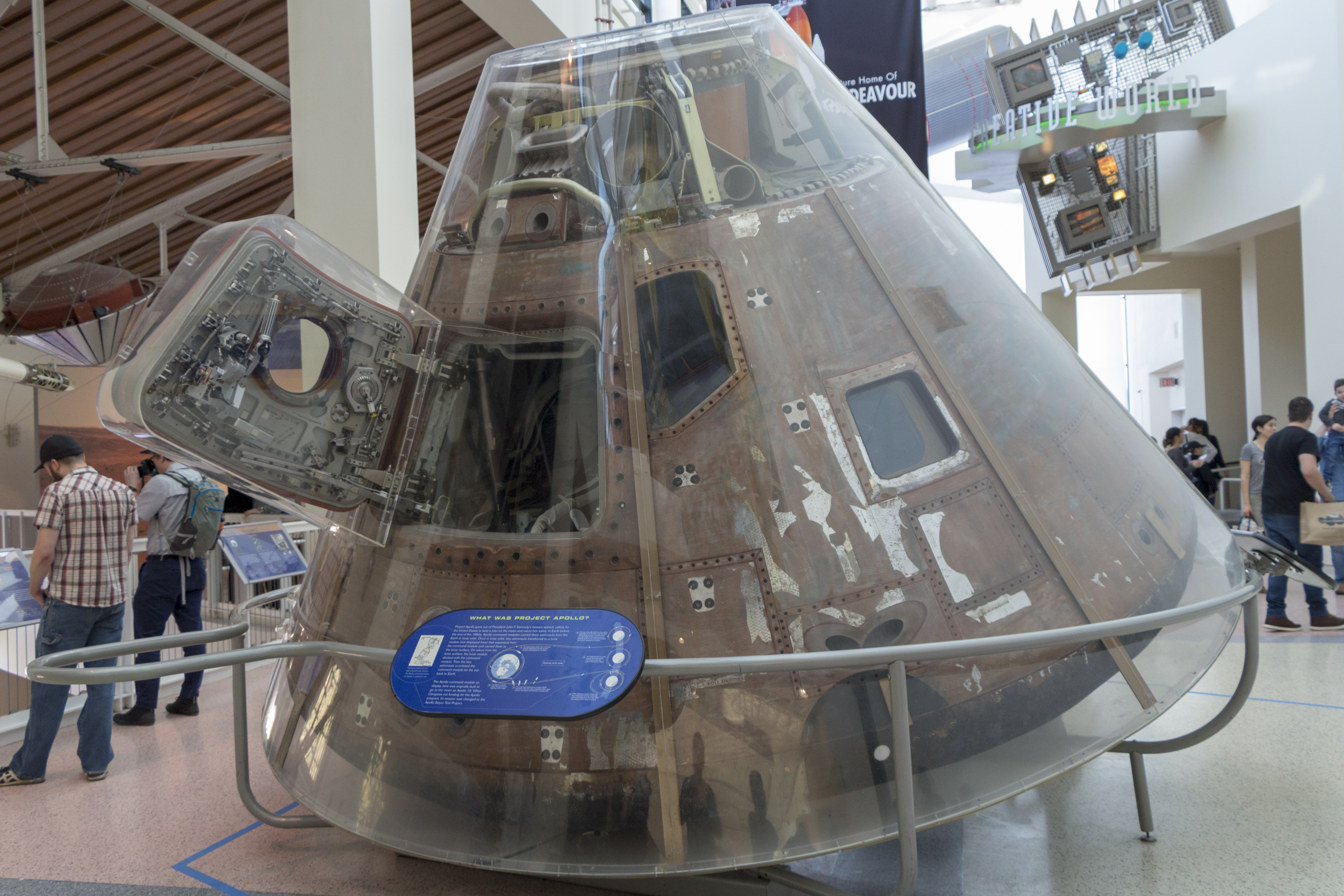
The door on the Apollo Command Module is an example of a simple developable mechanism because it conforms to the conical exterior of the Module, it moves, and its hinge line is aligned with the ruling lines of the conical surface.

Some well-known examples of developable mechanisms include the door on the Apollo Command Module and the cargo doors on the Space Shuttle. Both of these examples are single-hinge-line mechanisms. Note how in each case the joint axes are in line with the ruling lines of the surface. Images are shown on the right.

Origami uses developable surfaces because the paper can be assumed to not stretch. Action origami utilizes the movement of the origami.

Ortho-planar mechanisms are a subset of developable mechanisms where the developable surface is a plane and the links emerge out of the plane. Lamina Emergent Mechanisms are ortho-planar mechanisms (and hence also developable mechanisms) where the joints are compliant mechanisms. The same joints used to create lamina emergent mechanisms can be used to approximate developable surfaces

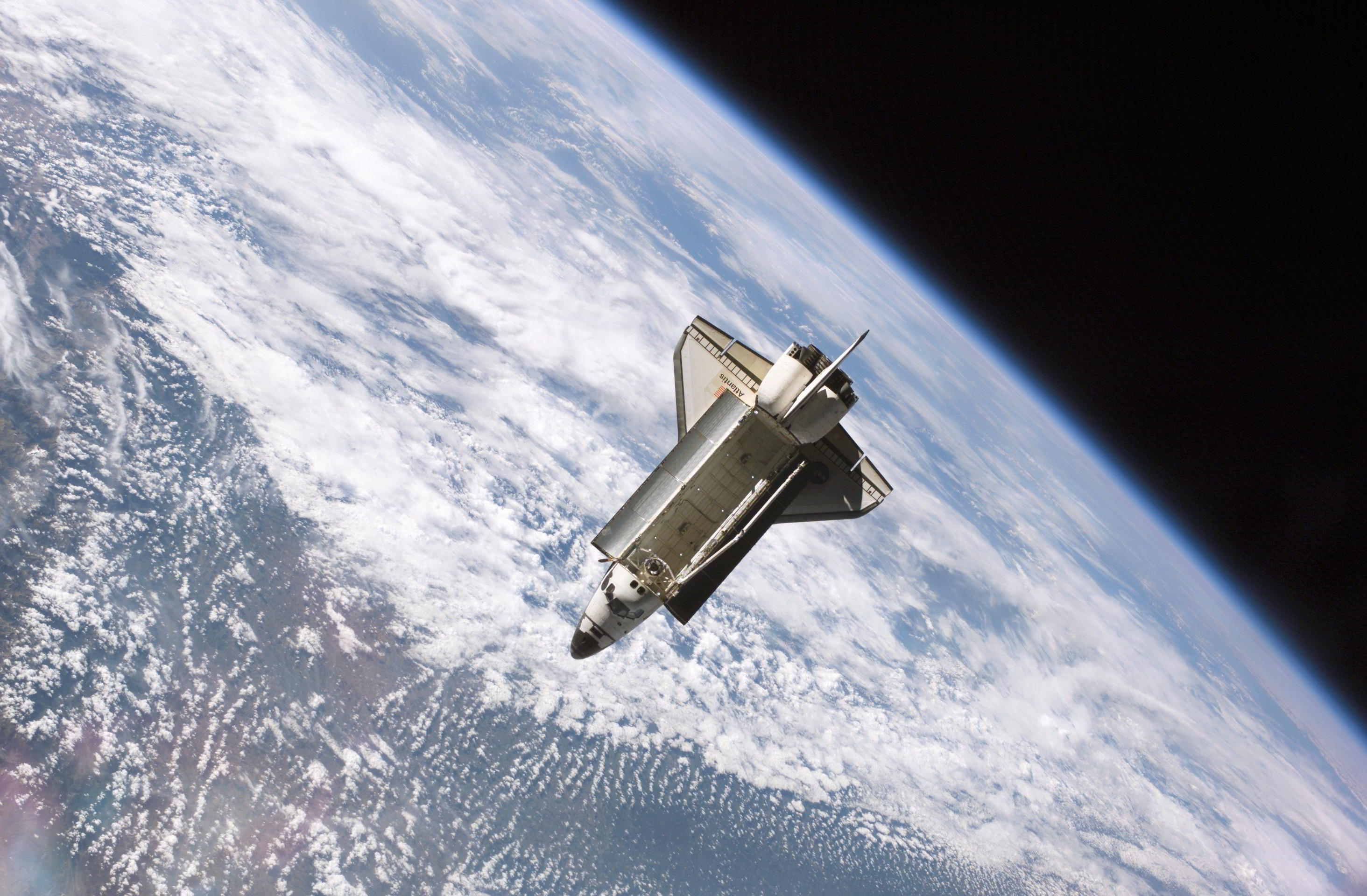
The cargo doors on the space shuttle are simple developable mechanisms because they conform to the exterior of the shuttle during liftoff, they can move, and their hinge lines are aligned with the ruling lines of the shuttle.

== Advantages ==
Developable surfaces are easy to manufacture and are found in many applications. Developable mechanism can be embedded within these surfaces.

Developable mechanisms are deployable.

Developable mechanism stow compactly during one position of the mechanism's motion.

== Mathematical Modeling ==
The motion of developable mechanisms can be modeled using traditional kinematics formulas. In rigid-body linkages, the shape of the rigid links does not change the motion.
